= Representative Association of Commissioned Officers =

Officers' association in Ireland's armed forces

The Representative Association of Commissioned Officers (RACO) is a representative body for officers of the Defence Forces of Ireland. RACO was formally established in 1991 by statute under the Defence Amendment Act. Defence Forces Regulation S.6 is the Statutory Instrument that gives effect to the Act and governs, inter alia, the establishment, funding and operation of representative associations in the Defence Forces. The scope of representation of the Association, as set out in DFR S.6 includes the pay and conditions of its members.

== Structure ==
The association has two full-time officials: a General Secretary, and a Deputy General Secretary.

The National Executive consists of seven officers; the President (who has a casting vote) and six others elected from different constituencies, namely 1 Brigade, 2 Brigade, the Defence Forces Training Centre (Curragh), Defence Forces Headquarters, the Air Corps, the Naval Service, and a representative of lieutenants (the latter replacing the representative of the former University Student Administrative Complement based in Galway). The six other members of the National Executive each chair an elected committee of five officers (chair included) representing their respective constituency.

== Membership ==
Membership of the Association is voluntary and open to all serving officers, from 2nd Lieutenant and Naval Ensigns up to Colonel and Naval Captains. Almost 97% of all officers of the Permanent Defence Force are members of the Association.

== See also ==
- Permanent Defence Force Other Ranks Representative Association (PDFORRA)
- Reserve Defence Forces Representative Association (RDFRA)
- Ombudsman for the Defence Forces (ODF)
