= 31st Reserve Engineer Company (Ireland) =

31st Reserve Engineering Company
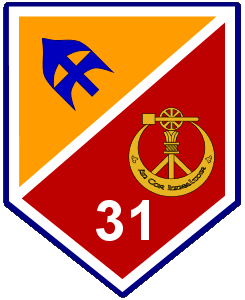
- 31st Res COE unit flash
- Active: 1959 - Present
- Country: Ireland
- Branch: Army
- Type: Irish Army Engineer Corps
- Role: Combat Engineering and General Engineering
- Size: Company
- Part of: Southern Brigade
- Garrison/HQ: Sarsfield and Collins Barracks

Commanders
- Notable commanders: Cmdt Gerard Beatty

The 31 Company of Engineers (previously 3rd Company of Engineers) was an Irish Defence Forces Engineering Support Company under the command of the Southern Reserve Brigade.

The unit HQ was based in Sarsfield Barracks Limerick (HQ + 2 platoons), and it also had elements based in Collins Barracks (Cork) (2 platoons).

== History ==
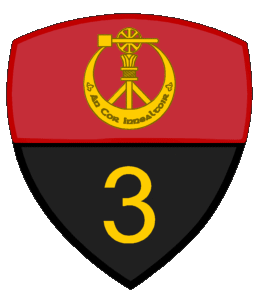
Previous 3rd COE crest

From 1959 to 2005, the company was part of the Forsa Cosanta Aituil and known as the 3rd COE.

It was decommissioned and replaced on 1 October 2005 with the integration of the Irish Defence Forces and the restructure of the Irish Army Reserve under the RDF.

The Unit was stood down in late 2012 as part of the RDF reorganisation.

== Roles ==
The 31st COE fulfilled the Combat Engineer role within the 1st Southern Brigade RDF. The 31st COE maintains specialist’s skills were in line with their PDF counterparts.

=== Mobility ===
This involves improving the ability of friendly forces to move around the battlefield. The 31st COE fulfills this role by maintaining skills necessary for the;

- breaching and clearing of minefields
- gap & river crossing (infantry & vehicular bridge deployment)
- obstacle clearance (including use of explosives for obstacle reduction and provision of alternative access or egress points in the urban environment)

=== Counter Mobility ===
The aim of counter mobility operations is to reduce the ability of enemy forces to move around the battlefield. The 31st COE has the capability to;

- destroy bridges or buildings
- render roads or areas impassable to tanks
- create substantial roadblocks to deny roads to both infantry and mechanised enemy
- create extensive defensive obstacles ranging from barbed wire entanglements to defensive anti-tank minefields

=== Survivability ===
To improve the survivability of defensive positions the 31st COE can strengthen existing fortifications and supplement them with defensive trench systems, machine gun bunkers, mortar positions, etc...

=== Other roles ===
In addition, the 31st COE can deploy in the Battlefield Services role. This role principally relates to support of units operating considerable distances from a secure base and can range from the creation of substantial base camps, establishing a secure floodlit perimeter with defensive positions, erecting tented command positions and accommodation, providing on-site electricity generation and large scale on-site water purification.

The Basic Field Engineering role supplements the other roles, allowing the 31st COE to construct lifting and gap crossing devices with minimal equipment in demanding conditions.

=== Former HQ Officers ===
Cmdt John Keane AR (Retired)

Cmdt Pat Lavin AR (Retired)

Cmdt Gerard Beatty AR (Retired)

Captain Gerard Russell AR (Retired)

Lt Gerard O'Donoghue AR

=== Former HQ NCO's ===
Company Sergeant Patrick Hincy AR (Retired)

Company Quarter Master Sergeant Martin Cronin AR

Training Sergeant Mark O'Reilly AR

Transport Sergeant Pops McGrath AR (Retired)

Sergeant Dwayne O'Doherty AR (Retired)

Corporal Gerard Arthur AR (Retired)

Corporal Shane O'Reilly AR
