= 56th Reserve Infantry Battalion (Ireland) =

The 56th Reserve Infantry Battalion (56 Res Inf Bn, or 56 Bn) was an Irish infantry battalion of the Reserve Defence Forces.

56 Bn, also known as the Midland Battalion, was created by the amalgamation on 1 October 2005 of the old 16th Battalion, 17 Bn and parts of 19 Bn of the Irish Army's second-line reserve, the Fórsa Cosanta Áitiúil (FCA), into a reorganised Army Reserve.

56 Bn was abolished in a further 2012 reorganisation of the Defence Forces.
