= Reserve Defence Force Representative Association =

- Comhlachas lonadaitheach na nÓglach Cúltaca
- Reserve Defence Force Representative Association flag

- Abbreviation: RDFRA
- Formation: 1992; 34 years ago
- Type: association
- Legal status: military membership association
- Headquarters: Clarke Barracks, Defence Forces Training Centre, Curragh Camp, County Kildare
- Region served: Ireland
- Services: military reserve personnel representation
- Field: military
- Official languages: en, ga
- Website: RDFRA.ie

The Reserve Defence Force Representative Association (RDFRA) (Irish: Comhlachas lonadaitheach na nÓglach Cúltaca) is the representative military association for all ranks of the Reserve Defence Forces (RDF) in Republic of Ireland.

The Reserve Defence Force Representative Association was founded in 1992, and is responsible for representing and furthering the interests of active service members of the Irish Reserve Defence Forces, which is made up of the Army Reserve (AR) and Naval Service Reserve (NSR). Membership is open to all officer and other ranked personnel of the Reserve. Funding comes from government subvention and annual membership deductions.

The RDFRA National Office is located in Clarke Barracks at the Defence Forces Training Centre (DFTC) in the Curragh Camp, County Kildare.

== See also ==
- Permanent Defence Force Other Ranks Representative Association (PDFORRA)
- Representative Association of Commissioned Officers (RACO)
- Ombudsman for the Defence Forces (ODF)
