= Medical Corps (Ireland) =

- Irish: An Cór Liachta
- Country: Ireland
- Branch: Army
- Type: Medical corps
- Role: Medical support
- Part of: Defence Forces
- Mottos: Comraind Legis (Middle Irish for "equal division of healing")
- Website: www.military.ie/en/who-we-are/army/army-corps/medical-corps/

Insignia
- Flag
- Abbreviation: MED

The Medical Corps (MED) (Irish: An Cór Liachta) is the medical corps of the Irish Army, a branch of the Irish Defence Forces, responsible for the provision of medical, dental and pharmaceutical support to forces while on exercise and deployment.

Because it is not a fighting arm (non-combatant), under the Geneva Conventions, members of the corps may only use their weapons for self-defence.

== Insignia ==
The corps has its own insignia, designed by George Sigerson and TJ McKinney around various symbols of medicine and healing from Irish mythology. Its badge displays the words "Óglaigh na hÉireann" (the name of the Defence Forces in Irish) on a scroll at the top. At the bottom is another scroll with the corps' motto, "Comraind Legis". This Middle Irish phrase is a quotation from the Táin Bó Cuailgne, and is equivalent to modern Irish "comhroinn leighis" (literally "equal division of healing"); it translates as "impartial treatment", referring to how the warring heroes Cú Chulainn and Ferdiad would call a truce each night between their battles to treat each other's wounds.

In the centre is a silver hand, referring to Nuada Airgetlám, the mythological chieftain of the Tuatha Dé Danann who lost his hand in battle and had an artificial silver hand made to replace it, designed by Dian Cecht, the god of healing.

The scrolls are joined on each side by a staff about which a serpent is entwined. These do not represent the rod of Aesculapius (the Graeco-Roman mythological symbol of medicine), but rather the staff of Moses. They refer to the legend that the ancestor of the Gaels, Goídel Glas, and his people encountered the Israelites in the desert while the Israelites were suffering a plague of vipers. Goídel Glas was bitten by a viper, and Moses used his staff to cure him.

== Operations ==
Two teams from the Central Medical Unit (CMU) took part in the response to the West African Ebola virus epidemic under Operation Gritrock from 2014 onward, alongside UK and Canadian military medical personnel.

During 2020 and 2021, as part of Ireland's response to the COVID-19 pandemic, paramedics from the Army Medical Corps assisted in staffing ambulances with the HSE National Ambulance Service and Dublin Fire Brigade in order to increase capacity, Medical Corps personnel also formed part of the national testing and contact tracing programme, and administered vaccinations.

== Disposition ==
In 2009 the Minister for Defence commissioned a report into the Defence Forces' medical services by PA Consulting Group, which found that the Medical Corps was "increasingly stretched in service management and delivery", with an inefficient organisational structure that diverted its medical officers (ie doctors and dentists) away from clinical care.

During the Defence Forces re-organisation in 2012, the Medical Corps was separated into two component parts: Directorate Medical Branch, and the Central Medical Unit (CMU). Medical Branch is responsible for setting policy and guidelines, while CMU is tasked with service delivery.

The CMU is broken into the following detachments, all of which are under the command of CMU HQ which is based in St Bricin's Military Hospital Dublin;

- CMU 1 Bde
- CMU 2 Bde
- CMU DFTC
- Med School DFTC
