= Euromil =

Euromil may refer to:

- EUROMIL, the European Organisation of Military Associations and Trade Unions
- Euromil Mi-38, a cargo helicopter
- Euromil, the joint helicopter project of Eurocopter and Mil Moscow Helicopter Plant
