= Engineer Corps =

Several military services have combat engineer service corps:

- Canadian Military Engineers
- Indian Army Corps of Engineers
- Indonesian Army Corps of Engineers
- Irish Army Engineer Corps
- Israeli Engineering Corps
- Pakistan Army Corps of Engineers
- Royal Australian Engineers
- Royal Engineers (British Army)
- United States Army Corps of Engineers
- Rapid Engineer Deployable Heavy Operational Repair Squadron Engineers (United States Air Force)
- Naval Facilities Engineering Command (United States Navy)
- Seabee (United States Navy)

== See also ==
- Corps of Engineers (disambiguation)
