= Tony D'Arcy =

Irish republican activist (died 1940)

Tony D'Arcy (died 1940) was an Irish Republican militant and activist. A senior leader in the Irish Republican Army (IRA), he died on 16 April 1940 after a 52-day hunger strike, at the age of 32.

== Background, roles in the IRA and arrest ==
D'Arcy was from north Galway and became a member of the IRA during the 1930s. Tonys cousin Louis Darcy, was Commandant of North Galway Brigade IRA during the Irish War of Independence and was killed by British forces in March 1921 at the age of 23.

In 1938 the IRA's Chief of Staff Seán Russell appointed IRA Volunteer Tony D’Arcy to the IRAs Army Council and the Officer Commanding (O/C) of the IRAs Western Command. By 1938 D'Arcy had already become a key target for the Irish police Special Branch. In 1939 he was assigned to the IRA's Headquarters staff. D'Arcy and the younger members of the Headquarters – Michael Traynor and Jack McNeela proposed the launching of raids from the Free State across the border into Northern Ireland. This proposal eventually became the 1959–62 Border campaign.

On 17 February 1940 D'Arcy (and 15 other high ranking IRA men) were arrested at a meeting in a Dublin hotel. The topic of the meeting was planning for the upcoming Northern Campaign (September 1942 – December 1944), these arrests were a severe blow to the IRA organization. The men arrested were imprisoned in Mountjoy Prison during what was called The Emergency in Ireland. D'Arcy was sentenced to three months for refusing to account for his movements and for not giving his name and address when arrested. On Sunday 25 February 1940, six republican prisoners embarked on a hunger strike demanding free association and to have two prisoners (IRA Volunteers Nicky Doherty of County Meath and John Dwyer) moved from the criminal wing to the republican area within the prison (Mountjoy Jail).

== Hunger strike, death and response ==
Joining D’Arcy in the hunger strike were his cell mate Jack McNeela, Tomás Mac Curtain Jr. (the son of the assassinated Lord Mayor of Cork) Tomás Mac Curtain, Jack Plunkett of Dublin, son of Count Plunkett and brother of Joseph Mary Plunkett (executed for his roles in the Easter Rising of 1916), Tommy Grogan of Drogheda and Michael Traynor of Belfast (later named Ard-Rúnaí (Secretary General) of Sinn Féin). Close to the annual commemoration of the Easter Rising of 1916, a letter of protest was published which criticized the government's policy towards the hunger strikers from relatives of participants in the Easter Rising and the Lord Mayor of Dublin Kathleen Clarke, the wife of Tom Clarke and sister of Edward Daly (both executed in the Easter Rising of 1916).

After seven days of hunger strike the six strikers were told they would have to stand trial. They were to be represented by the well known Irish Republican and future Nobel Peace Prize winner Seán MacBride. The hunger strikers refused to appear in court and fought off attempts to bring them into court. D'Arcy, McNeela and Tom Grogan were very badly beaten. On 5 March 1940 D'Arcy was sentenced to three months in prison, he, Grogan and McNeela decided to continue their hunger strike. While Grogan survived, Tony D'Arcy and Jack McNeela died over a month later (within three days of each other) in St Bricin's Military Hospital, Dublin.

The IRA responded to the death of two of its officers with an attack on the seat of the Irish Government – Dublin Castle. In the early morning hours of 25 April 1940, a large land mine was detonated in the Lower Castle Yard which was housed the Detective Division (or Special Branch). Five Detectives reported injury and windows were blown out in the Chapel Royal and State Apartments.

At the time of his death D'Arcy was married with three young children. An owner of a garage and a undertaker by profession, his body was carried in his own hearse, driven by neighbor Joe Glynn of Headford. He was buried at Donaghpatrick Cemetery, Headford (his hometown), County Galway.

Between 1917 and 1981 a total of 22 Irish Republicans have died on Hunger-Strike. The largest hunger strike in Irish history was the 1923 Irish Hunger Strikes. The most Irish Republican deaths due to hunger strike was during the 1981 Irish hunger strike (March–October) in which ten men died.

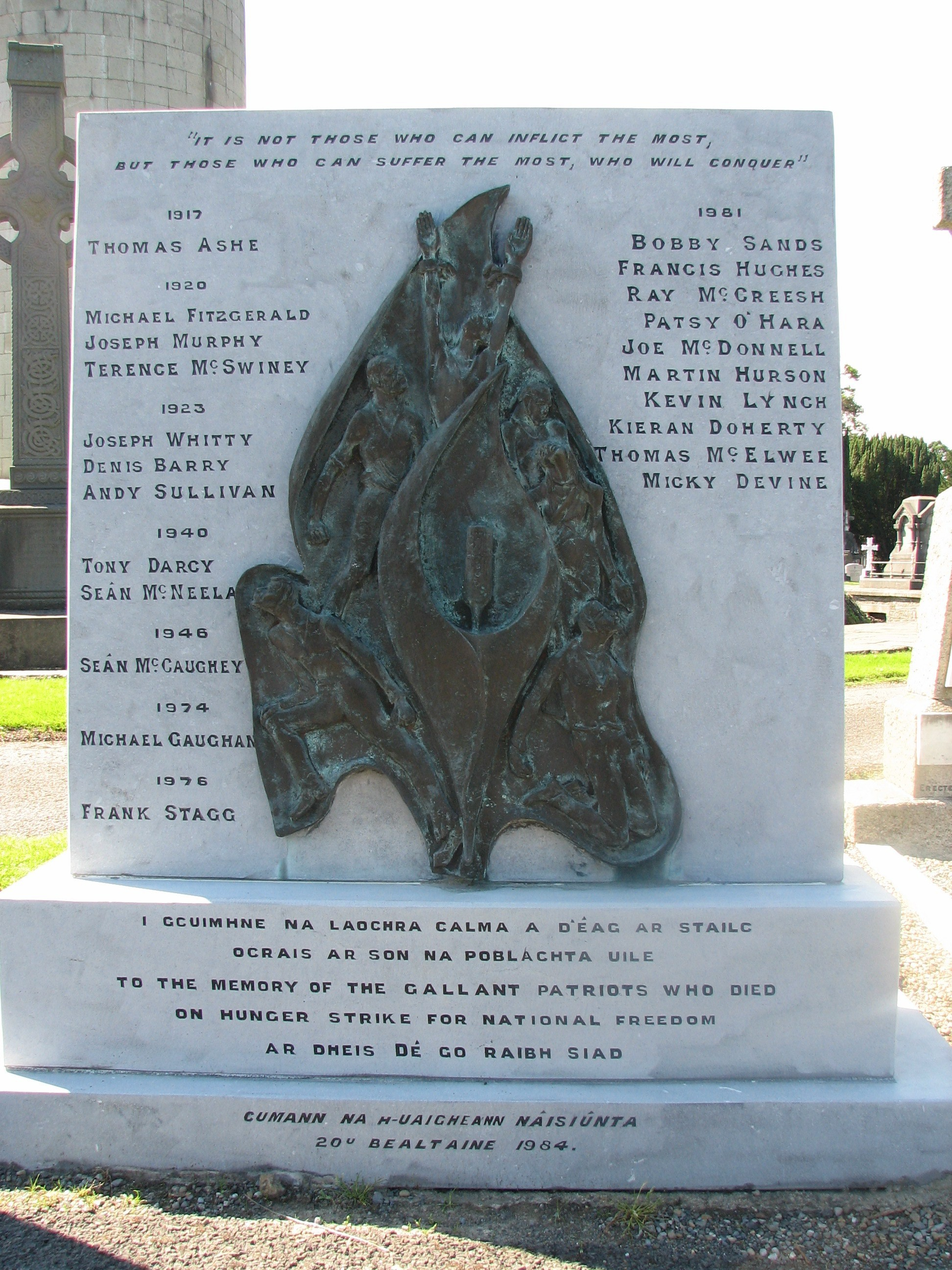
22 Hunger Strikers Memorial

== Sources ==
- http://hungerstrikes.org/forgotten_strikes.html
- Northern Nationalism, Eamon Phoenix, Ulster Historical Foundation, Belfast 1994 ISBN 0-901905-64-X
- The History and Folklore of the Barony of Clare, Michael J. Hughes, c. 1993.
- Biting at the Grave, O'Malley, Padraig, Beacon Press, Boston 1990 ISBN 0-8070-0208-9
- Pawns in the Game, Flynn, Barry, 2011, Collins Press, Cork, Ireland ISBN 9781848891166
