= Naval College (Ireland) =

Coordinates: 51.83287°N 8.30493°W

- Country: Ireland
- Branch: Naval Service
- Part of: Defence Forces
- Garrison/HQ: Naval Base Haulbowline
- Website: Official website

Commanders
- Current commander: Officer Commanding Naval College

The Naval College is the principal naval military college in Ireland providing training to cadets, non-commissioned officers and recruits of the Irish Naval Service. The Naval College trains and educates personnel for service, providing a mixture of different courses ranging from officer training right through to naval engineering. The Naval College is based out of the Naval Service's headquarters at Naval Base Haulbowline but also provides classes and lessons in non-military naval training at the nearby National Maritime College of Ireland in Ringaskiddy.

== National Maritime College of Ireland ==
The Naval Service has forged a very close working relation with the National Maritime College of Ireland, with numerous courses and training programmes provided for recruits and officers of the Naval Service at the National Maritime College. The National Maritime College of Ireland provides the Naval Service with non-military training of personnel utilising state of the art training facilities. Military related training is conducted by the Naval College at Haulbowline.

The Naval College is composed of a number of schools, each providing training and instruction for specialised roles within the Irish Naval Service.

== Officer Training School ==
The Officer Training School is the main school for training of new officer cadets to the Irish Naval Service. The school provides cadet training spread over two years and six terms. The first year of cadet training is conducted at the Naval College in Haulbowline where they are taught basic military training such as weapons handling, marching, physical exercise, orienteering and leadership, among other things. Towards the end of the first year cadets are put to sea on Naval Service vessels to gain practical experience.

The second year of a cadet's training takes place at the National Maritime College of Ireland in Ringaskiddy where they begin a degree course in nautical studies. Upon successful completion of the two-year training cadets become commissioned officers whereupon they continue their training as officers under training at National Maritime College as part of an honours degree in nautical science.

== Military and Naval Operational Training School ==
The Military and Naval Operational Training School provides training to enlisted naval personnel including: recruit training, NCO leadership, naval communications, and seamanship. Recruit Training is 22 weeks in duration, where recruits learn basic skills including: arms drills, tactical training, physical training as well as fire fighting and personal survival. The recruit is promoted to Ordinary Seaman on completion of recruit training, and is assigned to one of following branches: Seaman, Mechanicians, Communications, or Logistics.

== School of Naval Engineering ==
The School of Naval Engineering provides technical training courses in areas such as mechanical, electrical and radar engineering. Other areas of naval learning include how to deal with fire and damage aboard vessels, conforming to standards established by the International Maritime Organization. The National Maritime College of Ireland provides a dedicated fire fighting and damage control training centre as part of this specialised training regimen. Basic and Advanced Fire Fighting courses are certified by the Department of Transport, Tourism and Sport, conforming to standards established by the International Maritime Organization.

=== Engine Room Artificer ===
The engine room artificer is responsible for the operation and maintenance of all plant and machinery onboard Naval Service vessels. Such machinery includes propulsion and electrical systems, reverse osmosis plants, hydraulics and pneumatic systems as well as Heating, Ventilation and Air Conditioning equipment.

=== Hull Artificer ===
A hull artificer is responsible for maintaining the ship's structural integrity as well as associated systems including plumbing, damage control and fire prevention systems.

=== Radio Radar Technician ===
The radio radar technician provides for the maintenance of all ship communication and radar systems. Such systems include satellites, internal communications, broadband, television, radio and radar equipment. Personnel selected for the role of Radio Radar Technicians attend Cork Institute of Technology and study for a Level 7 Degree in Electronic Engineering. Further training in this role is conducted under the Communications & Information Services Corps of the Irish Army at the Defence Forces Training Centre in the Curragh.

=== Electrical Artificer ===
Electrical artificers are responsible for the maintenance of all naval electrical equipment such as power systems and electrical wiring. Electrical Artificers receive the same training as Radio Radar Technicians at CIT undertaking the Level 7 Degree in electronic engineering.

== See also ==
- Defence Forces Training Centre
- Air Corps College (Ireland)
