= Operation Gritrock =

British, Irish, and Canadian Ebola intervention

- Part of Ebola virus epidemic in West Africa
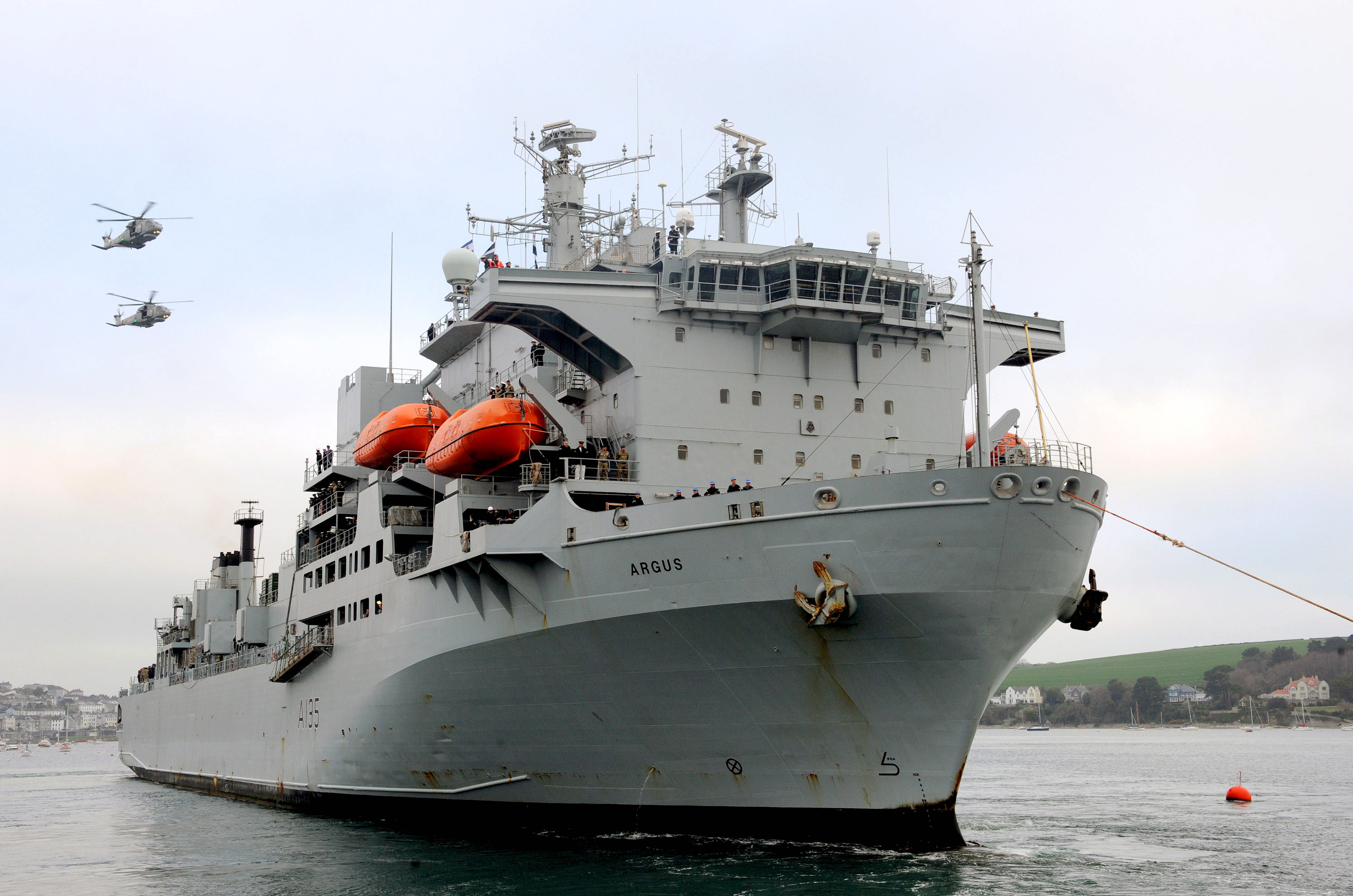
- RFA Argus returning from Sierra Leone.
- Location: Sierra Leone
- Planned by: (United Kingdom) David Cameron (PM) (United Kingdom) Michael Fallon (Secretary of State for Defence)
- Objective: Eradicate Ebola
- Date: 30 October 2014 – 13 November 2015 (1 year and 2 weeks)
- Executed by: Royal Air Force; Royal Navy; British Army; Irish Defence Forces; Canadian Armed Forces
- Outcome: Sierra Leone declared Ebola free.

Operation Gritrock was the code name given to the British, Irish and Canadian participation in the fight against the Ebola virus epidemic in West Africa. In November 2015, Sierra Leone was officially declared Ebola free. More than 50 members of British Army's 5 Armoured Medical Regiment were presented with operational medals for their duties in Sierra Leone during the crisis. Members of the Irish Army Medical Corps were awarded the International Operational Service Medal by the Irish government.

== Deployed forces ==
=== British Army ===
- HQ 104 Logistic Support Brigade, Commander – Brigadier Stephen McMahon CBE (Late Royal Logistic Corps).
- 5 Armoured Medical Regiment.
- 22 Field Hospital, Royal Army Medical Corps (RAMC).
- 34 Field Hospital, RAMC.
- 30th Signal Regiment, Royal Corps of Signals.
- 170 Infrastructure Support Group.

=== Royal Air Force ===
- Boeing C-17A Globemaster III.

=== Royal Navy ===
- RFA Argus (A135).
- 820 Naval Air Squadron with 3 x AgustaWestland Merlin HM.2.

=== Irish Army ===
- Medical Corps
  - Two teams from the Central Medical Unit (CMU)
