= Jack McNeela =

Irish militant and Republican activist

Jack McNeela (died 19 April 1940) was an Irish republican and a senior member of the Irish Republican Army (IRA) from Ballycroy, County Mayo, Ireland. McNeela was one of 22 Irish republicans (in the 20th century) who died on hunger-strike. As a young man, McNeela was an athlete in County Mayo and participated in Gaelic games. He came from a family of four brothers and two sisters. His brother Paddy was also a leader in the IRA, holding the position of Quartermaster general in Dublin.

== Arrests, leadership roles in the IRA ==
Jack McNeela was arrested and jailed several times for his Irish republican activities, first in 1937 when he was involved in a riot at a banned 1916 Rising commemoration in Castlebar. McNeela refused to recognize the authority of the military tribunal which tried him and he was convicted of riot and assault and sentenced to 12 months imprisonment. Later that year McNeela and 11 other IRA men were released on a Christmas pardon. In 1938 McNeela became a major leader within the IRA when he was appointed Officer Commanding (O/C) of all IRA forces in England and was intimately involved in the planning and implementation of the IRA's 1939-40 bombing and sabotage campaign in England - the S-Plan. This bombing campaign took place from January 1939 to March 1940 involved approximately 300 explosions resulting in 10 deaths, 96 wounded and substantial damage to English infrastructure.

While in London, McNeela was arrested in a vehicle that contained bomb-making material. McNeela was given a light sentence of four months imprisonment in England for membership in the IRA and associated misdemeanors. Upon release he returned to Ireland and in 1939 was appointed Director of Publicity for the IRA. McNeela assisted in the successful raid on the Irish Armys ammunition magazine in Phoenix Park, Dublin. The raiders got away with more than a million rounds of ammunition. While at the IRAs General Headquarters (GHQ) McNeela put forth a proposal to launch guerrilla raids from the Irish Free State across the border into Northern Ireland. This plan later became the Border campaign (Irish Republican Army) of 1957–1962. On 29 December 1939 McNeela and several others were arrested in south Dublin at a location where a pro-Irish Republican radio transmitter was operating illegally. McNeela and three other IRA men were imprisoned in Mountjoy Jail, tried (and found guilty) by a military tribunal for "conspiracy to usurp a function of Government" by operating the pirate radio station, with McNeela being sentenced to two years imprisonment.

== Leader of IRA prisoners in Mountjoy Jail, hunger strike ==
In February 1940, McNeela was elected O/C of the IRA prisoners in Mountjoy Jail. As O/C, McNeela requested that two IRA prisoners (Nicky Doherty of County Meath and John Dwyer) be transferred out of the criminal section of Mountjoy Jail to the republican area within the prison. After McNeela's request was ignored he and five other republican prisoners began a hunger strike - Tony D'Arcy, Tomás Mac Curtáin, (son of the late Lord Mayor of Cork Tomas Mac Curtain), Jack Plunkett of Dublin, (son of Count Plunkett and brother of Joseph Mary Plunkett), Tommy Grogan of Drogheda and Michael Traynor of Belfast, (later Secretary-General (Ard-Rúnaí) of Sinn Féin). Close to the annual commemoration of the Easter Rising of 1916, a letter of protest criticizing the government's policy towards the hunger strikers was published from relatives of participants in the Easter Rising and the Lord Mayor of Dublin Kathleen Clarke, the wife of Tom Clarke and sister of Edward Daly (both executed in the Easter Rising of 1916).

== Beating and Death ==
After seven days of hunger strike the six strikers were told they would have to stand trial. The hunger strikers refused to go to trial and attempted to fight off attempts to bring them to court. McNeela, D'Arcy and Tom Grogan were very badly beaten. McNeela suffered a serious gash to the face, a broken cheek and several broken ribs. With no concessions from the Irish Free State government, McNeela died on 19 April 1940 after 55 days on hunger strike in the Military Wing of St Bricin's Military Hospital, Dublin, aged 26. His friend, cellmate and fellow hunger striker Tony D'Arcy had died three days earlier at the age of 32 (16 April 1940), after 52 days on hunger strike. D’Arcy was serving a three-month sentence for refusing to account for his movements or give his name and address when he was arrested.

The IRA responded to the death of two of its officers with an attack on the seat of the Irish Government - Dublin Castle. In the early morning hours of 25 April 1940, a large land mine was detonated in the Lower Castle Yard which housed the Detective Division (or Special Branch). Five Detectives reported injury and windows were blown out in the Chapel Royal and State Apartments.

Jack "Sean" McNeela is commemorated at the republican plot of Leigue Cemetery, Ballina, County Mayo.

He was buried in his family plot in Claggan (St Fintany's) Graveyard, Ballycroy, Co Mayo.

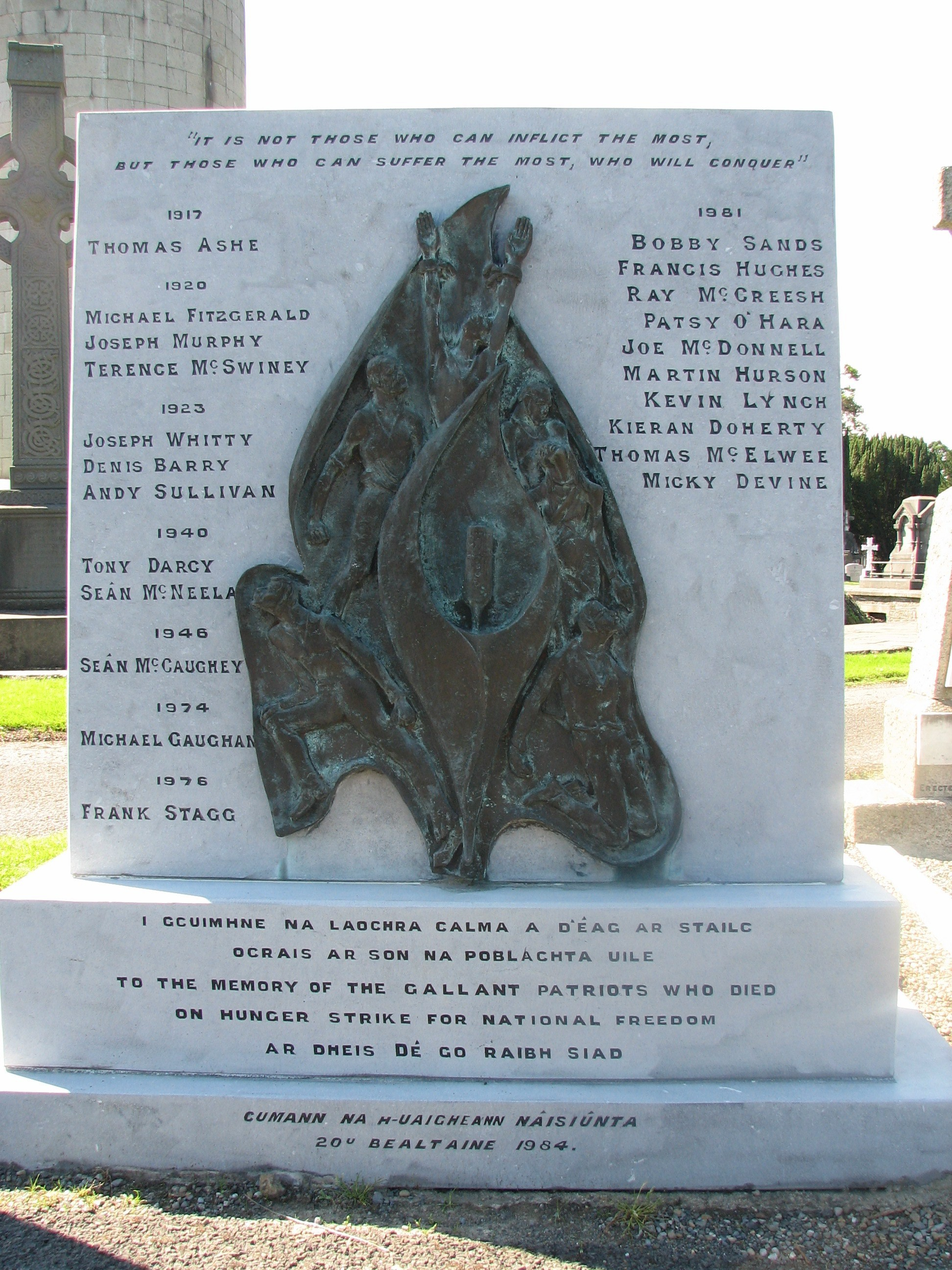
Memorial to 22 Hunger Strikers
