= Air Corps College (Ireland) =

Coordinates: 53°18′06″N 06°27′04″W

- Coláiste an Aerchóir
- Country: Ireland
- Branch: Irish Air Corps
- Part of: Defence Forces
- Garrison/HQ: Casement Aerodrome
- Website: www.military.ie/en/who-we-are/air-corps/air-corps-college/

The Air Corps College (ACC; Irish: Coláiste an Aerchóir) is the principal training and learning establishment of the Irish Air Corps. Its role is to instruct Officers, NCO's, recruits and cadets, in aspects of military aviation. The Air Corps College is based at Casement Aerodrome, the Air Corps principal base of operations and is composed of three schools: the Flying Training School (FTS), the Technical Training School (TTS) and the Military Training School (MTS), each of which provides specific training depending on the role the new recruit is going into.

== The Flying Training School ==
The Flying Training School is responsible for the training and education of all new Air Corps Officers and Cadets for their new role as Air Corp military pilots. The school utilises Pilatus PC-9M trainer aircraft in all training conducted.

Training lasts for approximately 18 months and teaches all the principles of aircraft piloting and flight in general.

The library at the College holds the Madeleine O'Rourke Collection of books donated by the family of O'Rourke.

== Technical Training School ==
The mission of the Technical Training School (TTS) is the teaching of technical skills to new apprentices of the Air Corps as they become aircraft engineers of the Air Corps. In partnership with Dublin Institute of Technology (DIT) the TTS runs degree level courses in Military Aviation Technology for new entrants to the Air Corps coming straight out of school.

== Military Training School ==
The Military Training School (MTS) provides for the military training of new Air Corps entrants according to the standards set by the Defence Forces. Multiple aspects of military training is conducted by the MTSS including marksmanship, weapons handling, physical training, military drills and survival training to name but a few.

A particular speciality of the MTS is the teaching of land and sea survival for air crews in the event of an air disaster. Students at the MTSS are taught skills for survival along with Survival, Evasion, Resistance and Escape (SERE) training for military crewmen downed in hostile territory.

== See also ==
- Defence Forces Training Centre
- Naval College
