= ODF (disambiguation) =

ODF, or OpenDocument Format, is an XML-based open file format for office applications.

ODF may also refer to:

== Computing ==
- OpenDocument Foundation, a defunct organization which had some interest in OpenDocument and alternative formats
- Optical distribution frame, a distribution frame device to terminate optical fiber cables

== Other uses ==
- Oregon Department of Forestry, a government agency in the U.S.
- Ombudsman for the Defence Forces, independent investigative military body in Ireland
- Open defecation free, a state of a village or community which has basic sanitation
- Operation Deep Freeze, a series of U.S. missions in Antarctica
- Orientation distribution function, in material science, a mathematical function for determining texture
- Osteoclast differentiation factor, in molecular biology, a signaling protein
- Open Dialogue Foundation, a human rights NGO in Poland
