= Permanent Defence Force Other Ranks Representative Association =

Representative body for Irish military personnel

The Permanent Defence Force Other Ranks Representative Association (PDFORRA) is the representative body for enlisted personnel serving in the Defence Forces of Ireland.

The purpose of PDFORRA is to represent and pursue the interests of enlisted personnel serving full-time in the Irish Army, Naval Service and Air Corps. The remit of the organisation includes issues regarding the pay and conditions of serving enlisted ranks in the Republic of Ireland. All serving enlisted members of the Permanent Defence Forces (PDF) are entitled to become members of the association.

== See also ==
- Representative Association of Commissioned Officers (RACO)
- Reserve Defence Forces Representative Association (RDFRA)
- Ombudsman for the Defence Forces (ODF)
