= Corps of Engineers =

Corps of Engineers may refer to:

== Military units ==
- Canadian Military Engineers, also known as the Corps of Royal Canadian Engineers
- Corps of Engineers (Ireland)
- Corps of Royal Engineers
- Indian Army Corps of Engineers
- Pakistan Army Corps of Engineers
- United States Army Corps of Engineers

== Other uses ==
- Corps of Engineers (Star Trek), a 2000–2010 Star Trek novel series

== See also ==
- Engineer Corps (disambiguation)
