= Arbour Hill =

Inner city area of Dublin, Ireland

Arbour Hill Cnoc an Arbhair (Irish)
- Inner city area
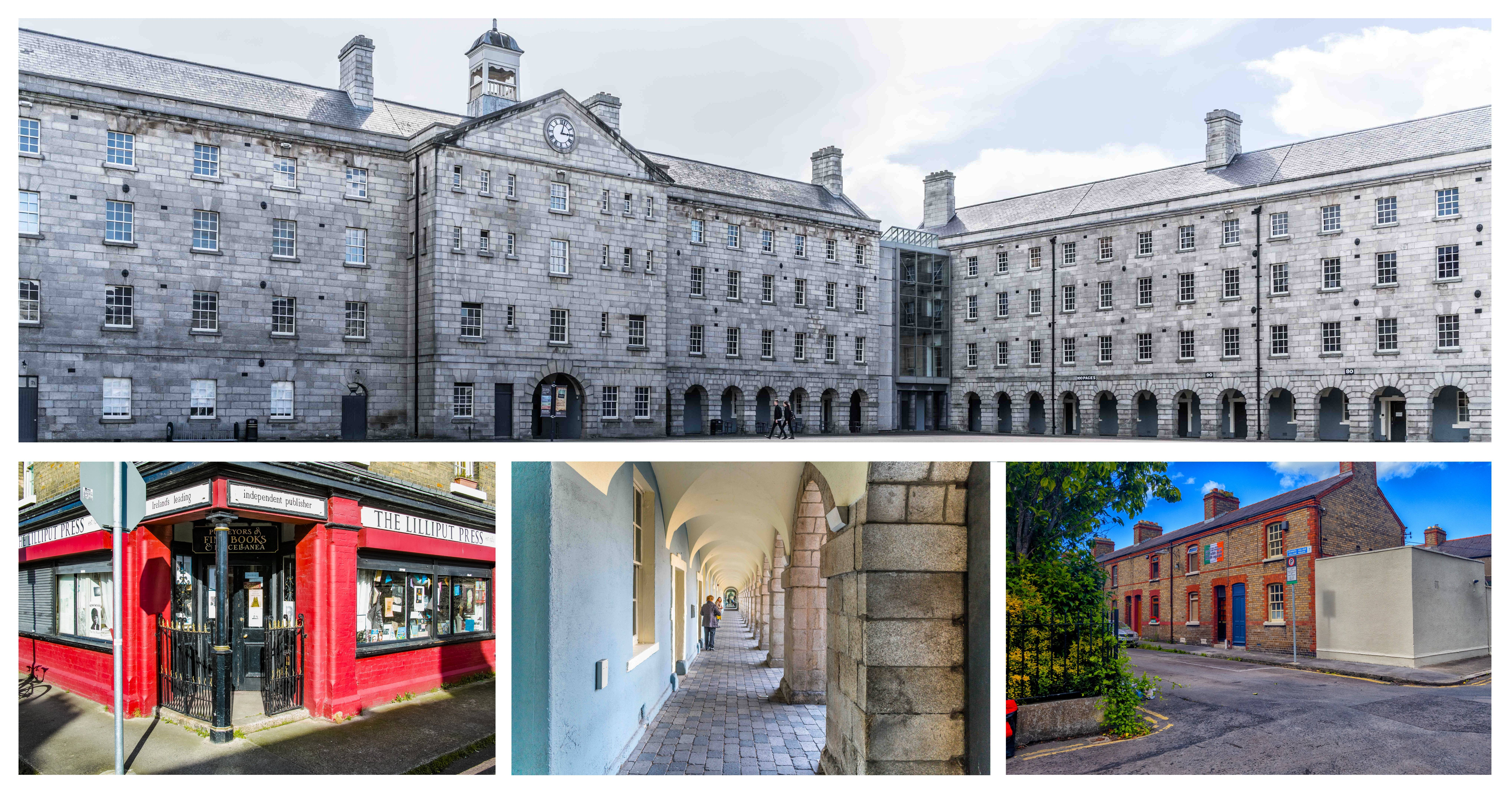
- Clockwise from top: National Museum of Ireland at Collins Barracks; Arbour Hill terraced housing; the cloisters at Collins Barracks; an independent publishing house and bookshop

- Location within Central Dublin
- Country: Ireland
- County: Dublin
- City: Dublin
- Postal district: D7

Arbour Hill (Irish: Cnoc an Arbhair) is an area of Dublin within the inner city on the Northside of the River Liffey, in the Dublin 7 postal district. Arbour Hill, the road of the same name, runs west from Blackhall Place in Stoneybatter, and separates Collins Barracks, now hosting part of the National Museum of Ireland, to the south from Arbour Hill Prison to the north, whose graveyard includes the burial plot of the signatories of the Easter Proclamation and other leaders executed after the 1916 Rising. St Bricin's Military Hospital, formerly the King George V Hospital, is also located in Arbour Hill.

== History ==
Arbour Hill is derived from the Irish Cnoc an Arbhair which means "corn hill". The area was owned by Christ Church Cathedral during the medieval period and was used to store corn. The area first appears on a map in 1603 as "Earber-hill".

As part of his commissioned symphonic work "Irishmen and Irishwomen", the composer Vincent Kennedy included a movement titled "Arbour Hill". This movement is a tribute to the Easter Rising participants buried at Arbour Hill.

== Gallery ==
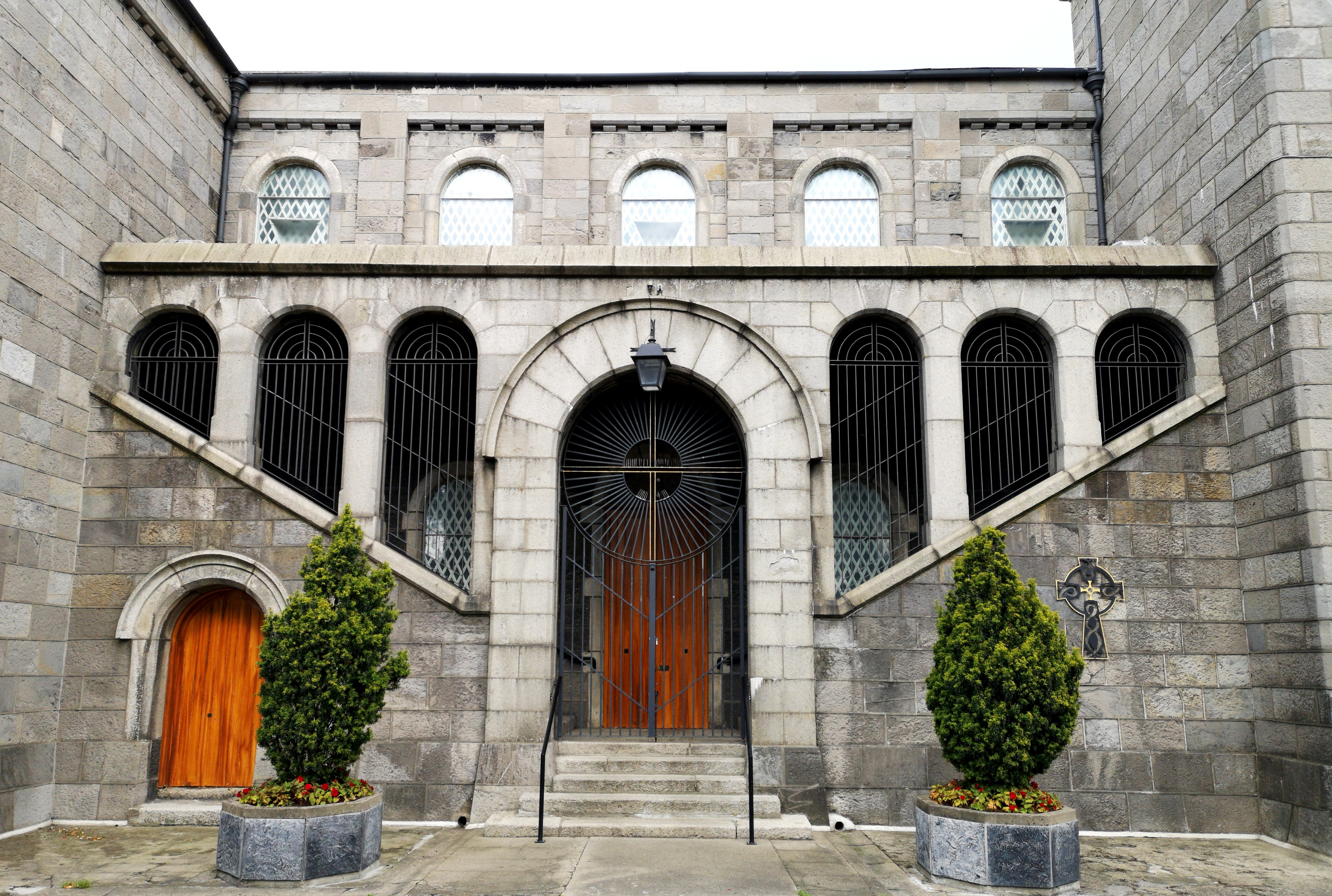
Church of the Sacred Heart, Arbour Hill

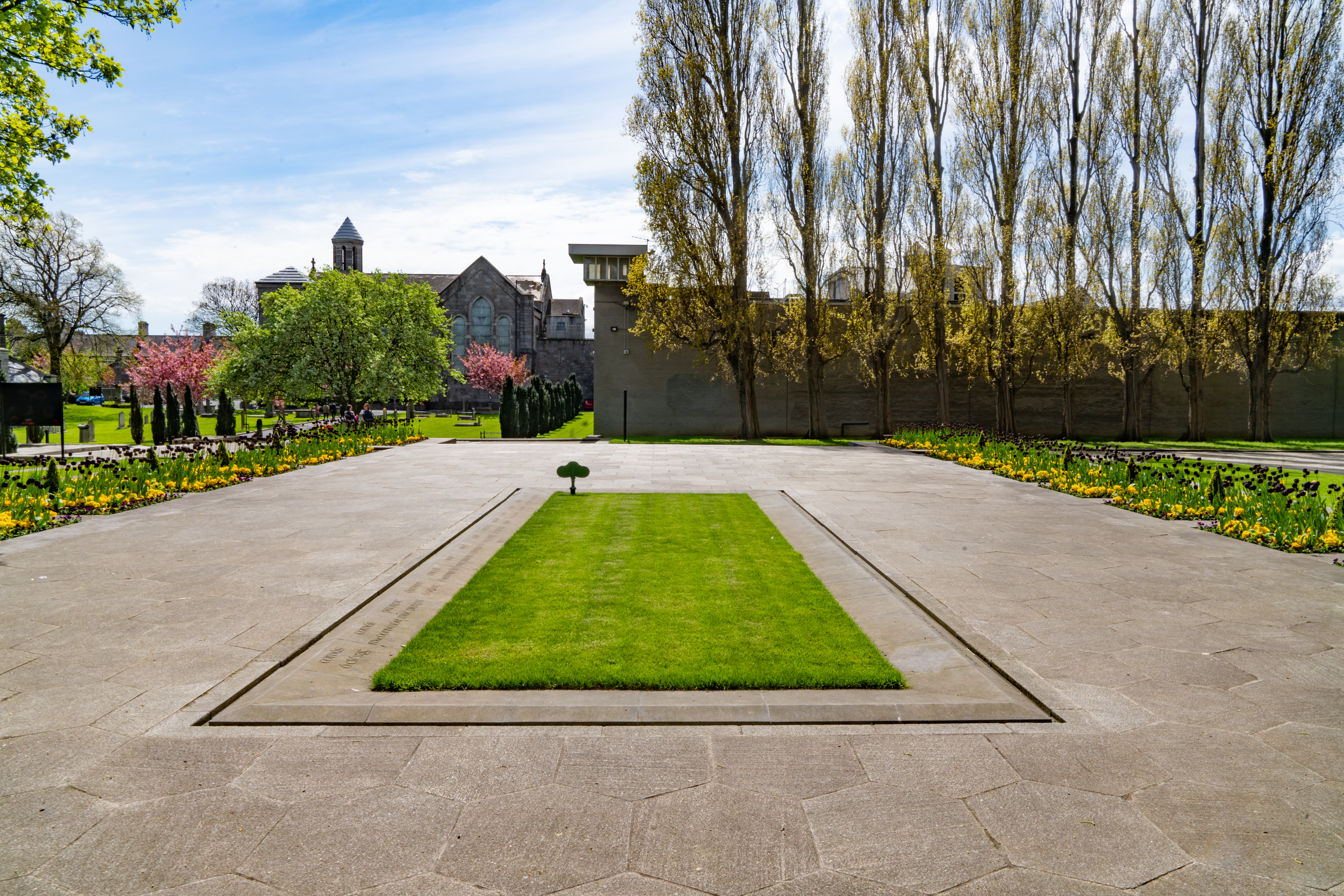
1916 memorial garden at Arbour Hill

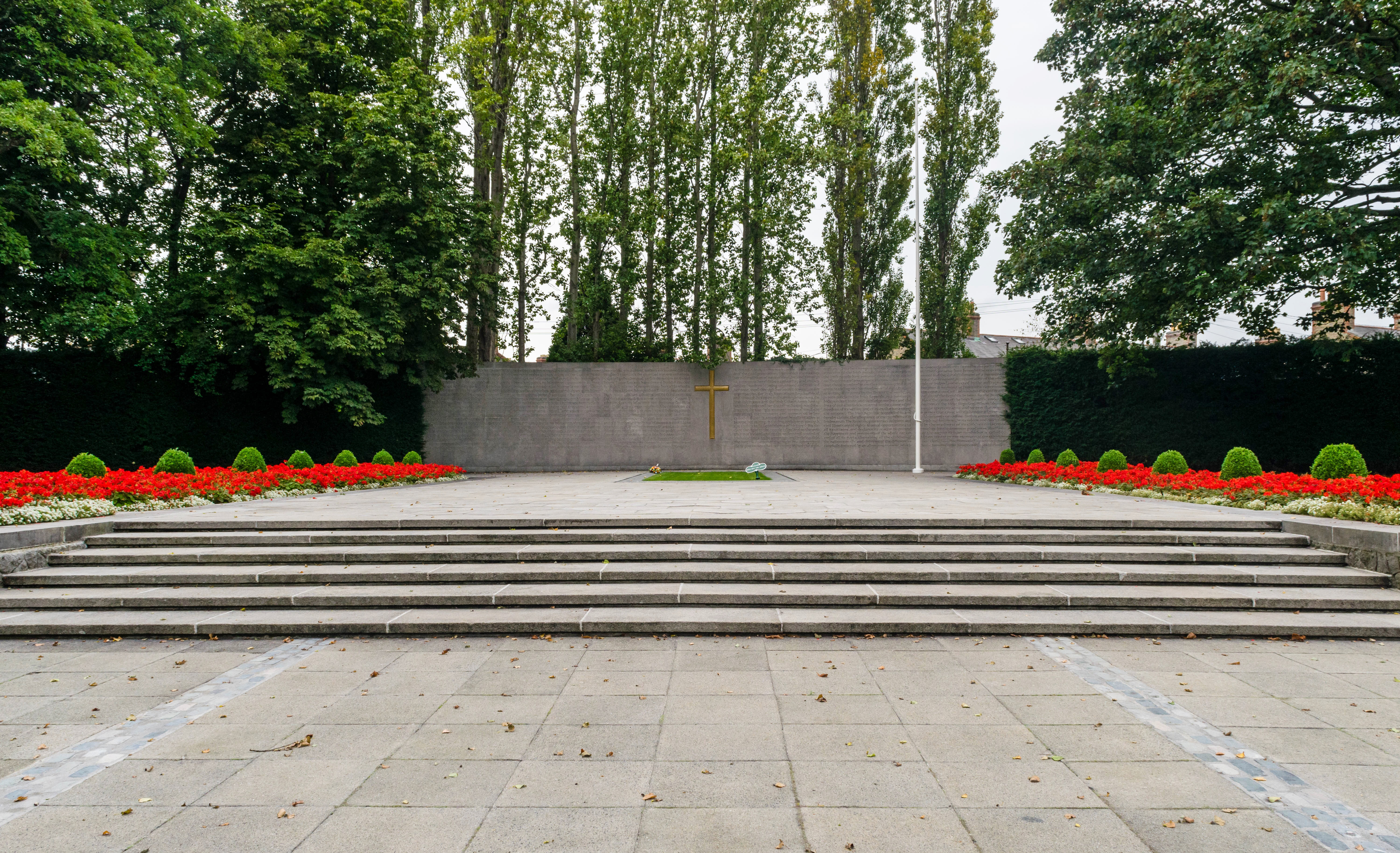
1916 memorial wall at Arbour Hill

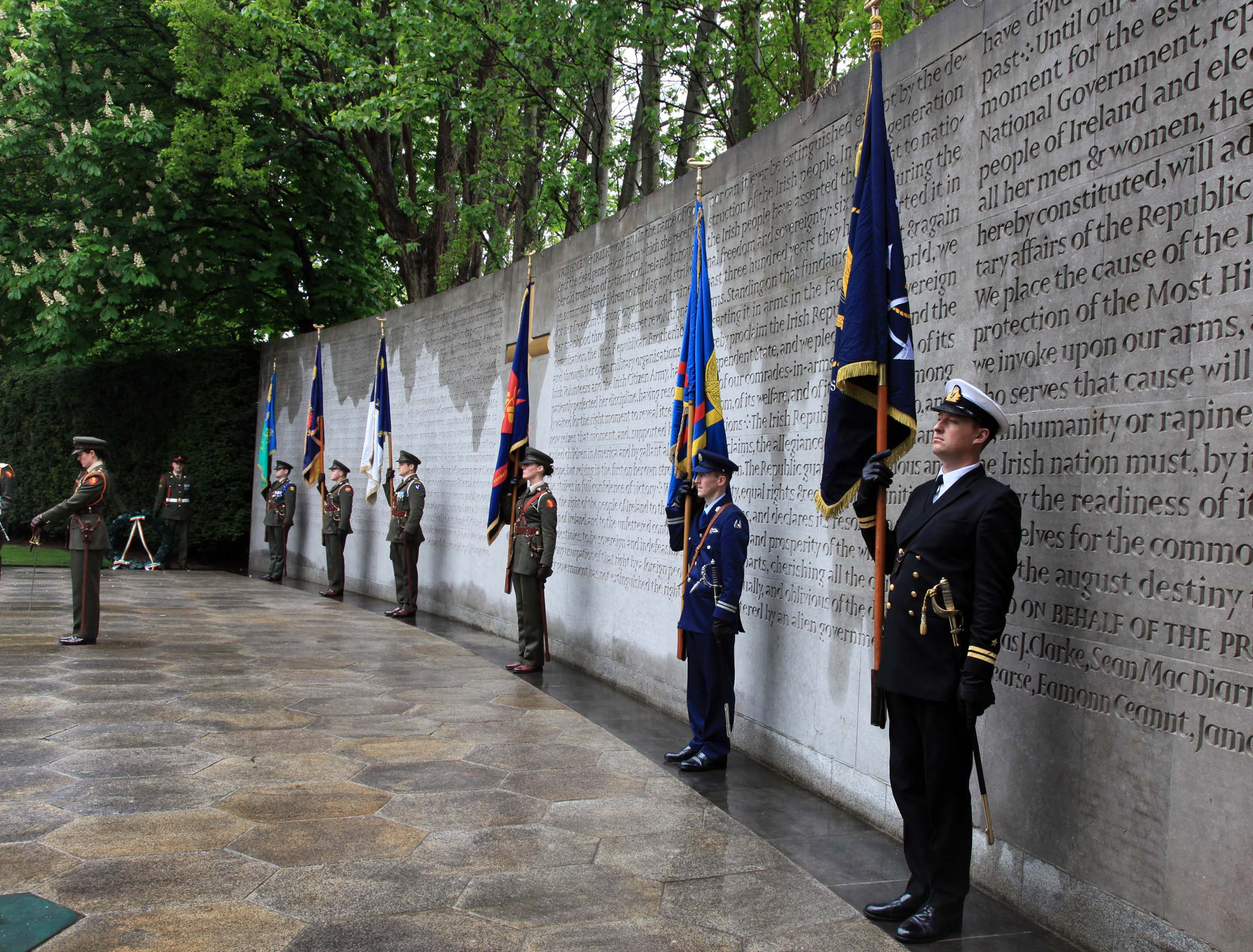
Wreath laying ceremony at the 1916 memorial garden at Arbour Hill
