= Corps of Engineers (Ireland) =

Irish Army Corps of Engineers
- Irish: An Cór Innealtóirí
- Active: 1 October 1924 – present
- Country: Ireland
- Branch: Army; Naval Service; Air Corps
- Type: Military engineering
- Role: Camp construction, military bridging
- Size: Engineer battalion
- Part of: Defence Forces
- Garrison/HQ: 1st Engineer Group - Cork; 2nd Engineer Group - Athlone; Engineer Group, Logistics Base Curragh - Kildare; Engineer Section, Air Corps - Casement Aerodrome; Engineer Section, Naval Service - Haulbowline
- Website: www.military.ie/en/who-we-are/army/army-corps/engineer-corps/

Insignia
- Flag
- Abbreviation: ENGR

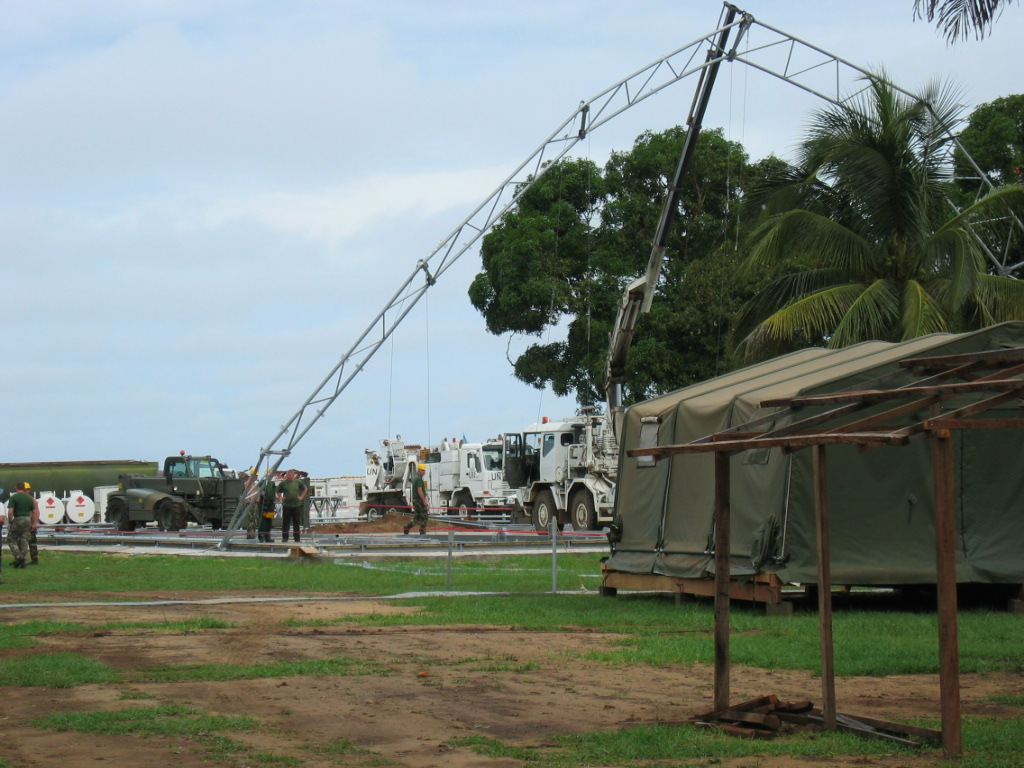
Engineers constructing Camp Clara in Liberia

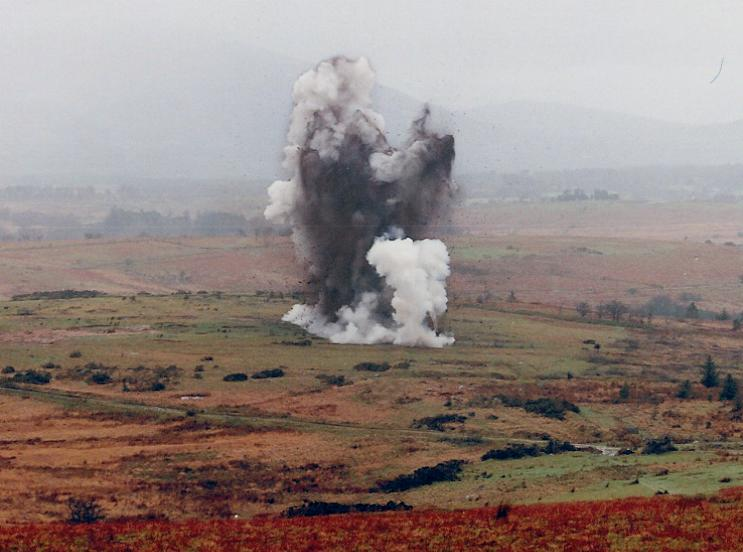
Detonation of explosives (demolition) in the Glen of Imaal for training purposes

The Corps of Engineers (ENGR) (Irish: An Cór Innealtóirí) is the military engineering branch of the Defence Forces of Ireland. The Corps is responsible for combat engineering, construction engineering, and fire fighting services within the Defence Forces. The main role of the combat engineers is to provide engineering on the battlefield; the Corps has successfully leveraged its skill and expertise in several of the Irish Army's deployments on United Nations operations.

== History ==
Following the establishment of the Irish Free State on 6 December 1922 General Routine Orders were issued which laid down the organisation of the first centralised Defence Forces. From an engineering point of view there were three particular problem areas to be overcome:-

- The Barracks and Posts throughout the state were in great need of repair following the War of Independence and the Civil War.
- There was a general shortage of materials.
- Most of the railway system was in disarray with many towns cut off.

To meet these requirements three (3) Corps were set up:

- The Works Corps - to carry out repairs and reconstruction.
- The Salvage Corps - to recover materials from damaged buildings for use elsewhere.
- The Railway Protection, Repair and Maintenance Corps - to rebuild the railway system.

The Corps of Engineers was established and took over from these three Corps with effect from 1 October 1924. In 1931 Field Engineer Companies and the School of Military Engineering were added to the establishment.

== Roles ==
The Corps has a wide variety of roles, covering conventional warfare, and training for the Defence Forces. With such a wide range of skills, the Engineer Corps provide a variety of support to the Army. This support includes anything from the provision of:

- Mobility
  - Clearing terrain obstacles
  - Constructing roads and bridges
  - Demining
- Counter mobility
  - Planting landmines
  - Digging trenches and ditches
  - Demolishing roads and bridges
  - Demolitions
- Survivability
  - Building fortifications
  - Camp Construction: Camp Clara (Monrovia, Liberia), Camp Clark (Kosovo)
- General Engineer Support
  - Counter Terrorist Search
  - Fire fighting & RTA
  - EOD
  - CBRN defence
  - Humanitarian Demining

== Missions ==
The Corps have seen active service in UNMIK, Somalia (UNOSOM II), Congo (ONUC), Lebanon (UNIFIL), Liberia (UNMIL) & Chad (EUFOR Tchad/RCA) - where the Engineer Corps was deployed to construct Camp Ciara in advance of a contingent of more than 500 troops.

Army engineers were deployed alongside personnel from the Naval Service and NSR in early 2020 as part of Ireland's response to the coronavirus pandemic (COVID-19).

== Equipment ==
- Aardvark Midi Mine flail
- DOK-ING MV-4 Remotely Operated Mine flail; 2 donated to Ukraine
- Cyclops Mk4 Remotely Operated Vehicle
- Remote Firing Demolitions Equipment (BIRIS, PRIME, DRFD)
- Mabey Johnson Bridge
- Infantry Assault Bridge
- Medium Girder Bridge
- FFV 013 Area Defence Munition
- Rigid-hulled inflatable boats (RIBs) (Delta 7 metre, Lencraft 5.1 metre dive, and Lencraft 7.5&6.5 metre intruder RIBs)

== Corps of Engineers Units (2013) ==
- 1st Engineer Group (Replaced 1st Field Engineer Company)
- 2nd Engineer Group (Replaced 4th Field Engineer Company)
- Engineer Section, Air Corps. Attached Irish Air Corps
- Engineer Section, Naval Service. Attached Irish Naval Service
- Engineer Group, Logistics Base Curragh

== Disbanded (Defence Forces Re-org 2012) ==
- 2nd Field Engineer Company
- 31st Field Engineer Company
- 62nd Field Engineer Company
- 54th Field Engineer Company

== Future developments ==
As in all aspects of society, legislative changes and technological advances have required workforces to become more specialised and more highly skilled. The Irish Defence Forces is no exception - requiring specialist skilled engineers.

Compared with Defence Forces in other countries e.g. British and French Armies, the number of engineers in the Irish Defence Forces is low, 5.5% against 8.8% and 12.8% respectively.

== Gallery ==
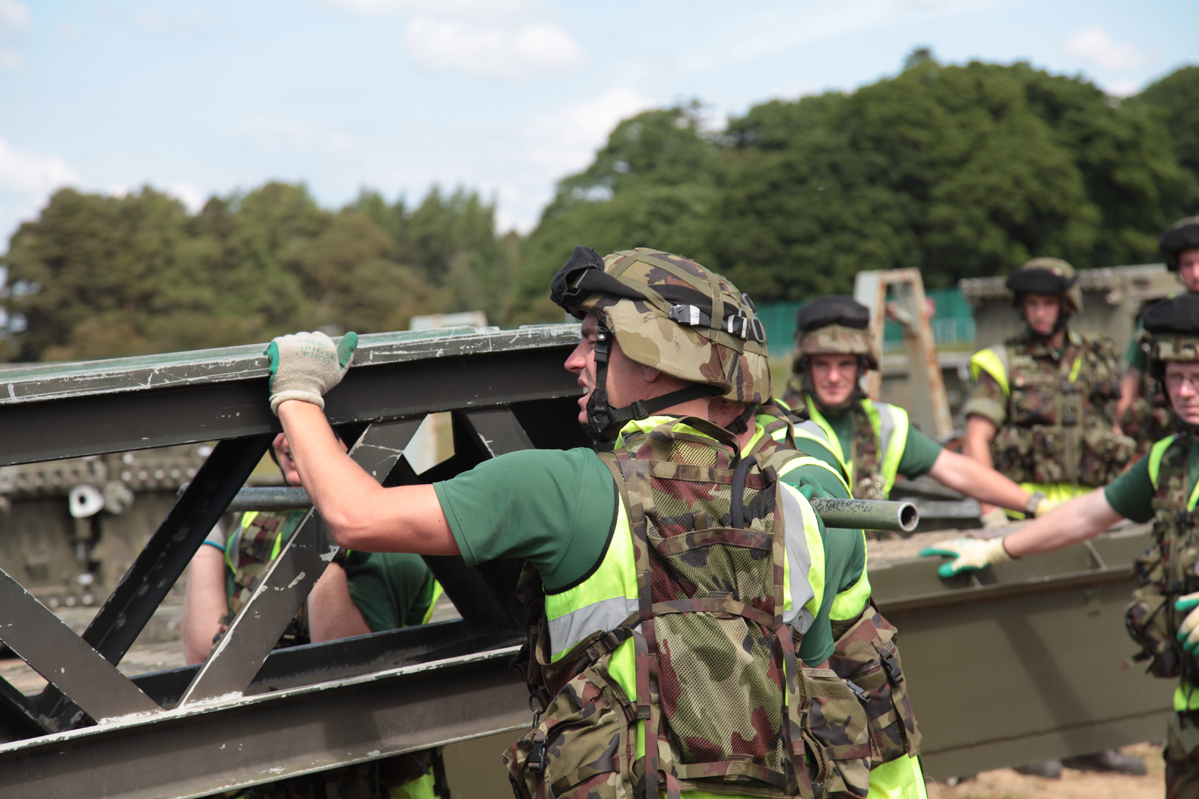
Bridge building

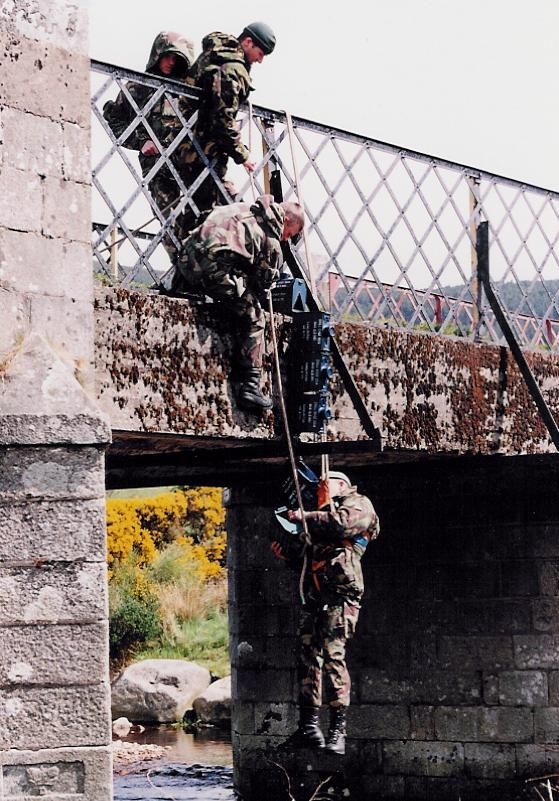
Demolition using Hayrick shaped charges

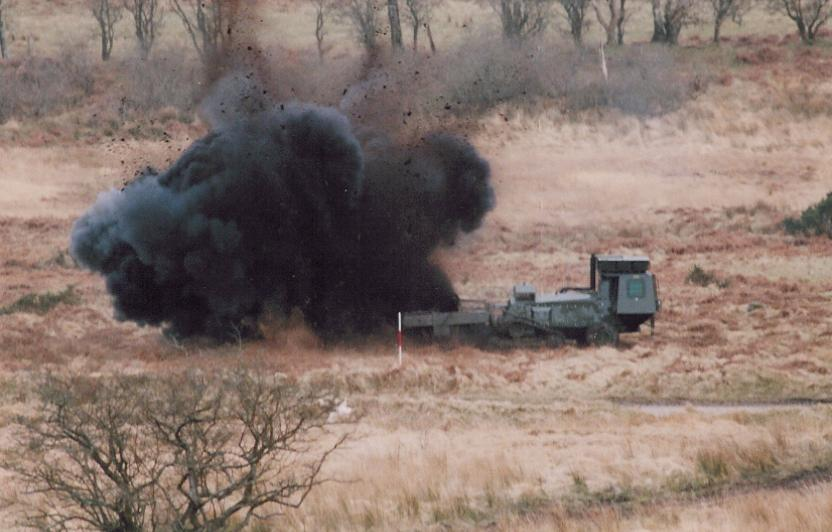
Aardvark Joint Service Flail detonating an Anti-Tank Landmine

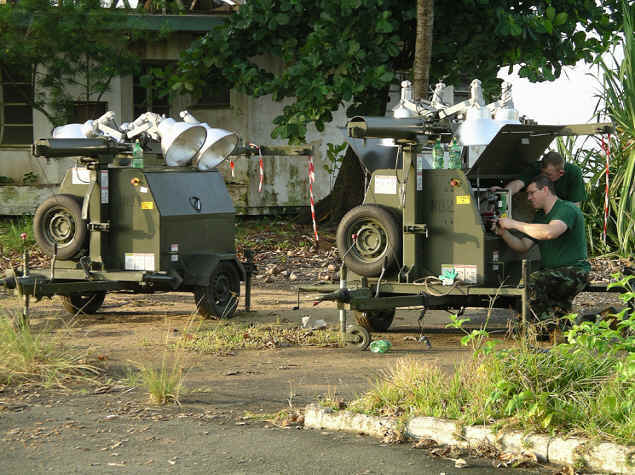
Installing Lighting Towers

Fire Service DFTC
