= Louis Darcy =

Louis Darcy (Lúbhadh Ó Dorchaidhe) was a member of the Irish Republican Army. He was killed by the Black and Tans on 24 March 1921.

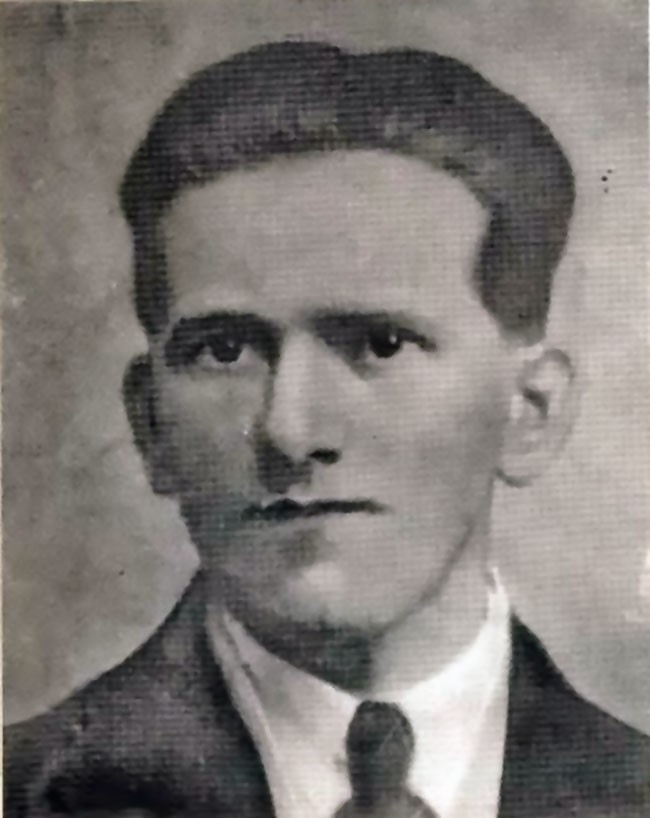
Louis D'Arcy 1920

== Biography ==
Louis (Aloysius) Darcy was born in 1897 and raised in the small country village of Clydagh, Headford, County Galway. Louis D'Arcy came from a large family, many of his siblings were active republicans in the region throughout the Irish revolutionary period. At the time of his death, he was the Officer Commanding of the third Battalion of the Irish Republican Army Mid-Galway Brigade. The Headford Battalion as it was commonly known consisted of Volunteers from the Cloneen, Claren and Caherlistrane Companies.

Darcy was captured at Oranmore railway station by the Black and Tans. After two days of imprisonment, he was identified by members of the Headford Royal Irish Constabulary. Later that night he was shot by the Black and Tans; his body was tied to the back of a lorry and pulled behind as it drove from Oranmore to Roscam, where it was thrown into the wood at Merlin Park. Many local people saw D'Arcys killing as revenge for the death of Constable Martin Foley who had been shot and killed by the IRA at Merlin Park seven months previously.

British Military Intelligence received information on Darcy from an informant.

There is a ballad written in honour of Louis Darcy.

== See also ==
- Tony D'Arcy
