= Naval Service Reserve =

Reserve maritime component of the Irish Defence Forces

- Irish: Cúltaca na Seirbhíse Cabhlaigh
- Emblem of the Naval Service Reserve
- Active: 1 October 2005–present
- Country: Ireland
- Branch: Naval Service
- Type: Naval Reserve
- Size: 97 personnel (Aug 2024); 200 (establishment)
- Part of: Irish Defence Forces
- Website: www.military.ie/en/who-we-are/reserve-defence-forces/naval-service-reserve/

Commanders
- Flag Officer Commanding: Commodore Darragh Kirwan

Insignia
- Cúltaca shoulder insignia

The Naval Service Reserve (NSR) (Irish: Cúltaca na Seirbhíse Cabhlaigh) is the reserve force of the Irish Naval Service. It is one of three elements of the Reserve Defence Forces (RDF) of the Irish Defence Forces, the other two being the First Line Reserve and the Army Reserve (AR). The NSR was established on 1 October 2005 to replace and reorganise the previous naval reserve organisation, Irish: An Slua Muirí, which in turn replaced the fore-runner Maritime Inscription founded in 1940 to act as a Port Control authority during The Emergency (WWII). Originally formed at Dublin's Alexandra Basin, its headquarters was in Portobello barracks, now known as Cathal Brugha Barracks.

== Organisation ==
Organised in five units, one each in Dublin, Waterford, Cork and Limerick, and another specialist unit, the Technical Support Unit. As of August 2024 the NSR had a strength of 97 personnel of all ranks. The reserve supplements the crew of vessels of the Irish Naval Service during patrols of territorial waters and overseas visits, as well as conducting stand-alone operations within their respective ports, such as security duties, sighting reports and intelligence gathering. All Naval Service Reserve members fall under the Naval Service Executive Division (Seaman's Division).

Enlistment is open to EU citizens between the ages of 18 and 39, provided they are ordinarily resident in Ireland, can pass fitness tests, an interview, medical examination, are of good character and obtain a security clearance, and also to non-EU citizens who have been continuously legally resident in the Republic for at least three years.

The NSR is a part-time voluntary organisation, and trains members in aspects of nautical and military disciplines to supplement and aid the permanent Naval Service. Periods of enlistment vary and is initially for four years. Progression through the ranks is possible including a commission and promotion to the rank of Lt/Cdr (see Irish Naval Service#Personnel and ranks).

Up to 6 weeks paid training may be undertaken by a reservist each year (further sea training possible when demand arises). Reservists are liable to be called up on permanent service by ministerial order in times of emergency.

NSR personnel formed part of the crew of the LÉ Eithne which was deployed to Cork as a testing centre in support of the HSE, as part of Ireland's response to the coronavirus pandemic (COVID-19) in early 2020.

== Equipment ==
Since 2018, when the last motor launch of the NSR was decommissioned on "age grounds", the NSR was without any dedicated vessels (aside from rigid-hulled inflatable boats (RHIB)). In 2021, an order was placed with FM Marine Services Ltd to construct four motor launches for the NSR. The 30-tonne boats are designed to have a crew of four and can be armed with two general purpose machine guns. The boats, which are planned to be based at Dublin, Cork, Waterford and Foynes/Limerick, are due to be named after the children of Lír. The first, named Fionnghuala, was launched in December 2024, and was followed by Aodh in June 2026.

== See also ==
- Irish Defence Forces rank insignia#Irish Naval Service
- Irish Naval Service#Weapons
