= Reserve Defence Forces =

Combined reserve components of the Irish Defence Forces

Reserve Defence Force
- Na hÓglaigh Cúltaca
- Irish Defence Forces badge
- Founded: 1 October 2005; 20 years ago
- Service branches: Army Reserve; Naval Service Reserve
- Headquarters: Directorate of Reserve Forces, Operations Division DFHQ
- Website: www.military.ie/en/who-we-are/reserve-defence-forces/

Leadership
- Chief of Staff: Lieutenant General Rossa Mulcahy
- Deputy Chief of Staff for Operations: Major General John Whittaker

Personnel
- Reserve personnel: 1,807 personnel (Establishment: 4,069; March 2026)

The Reserve Defence Forces (RDF) (Irish: Na hÓglaigh Cúltaca) are the combined reserve components of the Irish Defence Forces. The RDF is organised into the First Line Reserve (FLR) and an active Second Line Reserve. The First Line Reserve is composed of former members of the Permanent Defence Force (PDF) and, as of March 2026, had a strength of 204. The Second Line Reserve comprises the Army Reserve (AR) with, as of March 2026, a strength of 1,473 out of an established strength of 3,869, and the Naval Service Reserve (NSR), with a strength of 134 out of an established strength of 200.

The RDF was established in its current form on 1 October 2005; 20 years ago, and replaced the Second Line Reserve, previously named An Fórsa Cosanta Áitiúil (FCÁ) in the case of the Army Reserve, and An Slua Muirí in the case of the Naval Service Reserve. The RDF has undergone significant reorganisation and modernisation, in tandem with the Permanent Defence Force, as part of the 'Single Force' concept.

== History and organisation ==
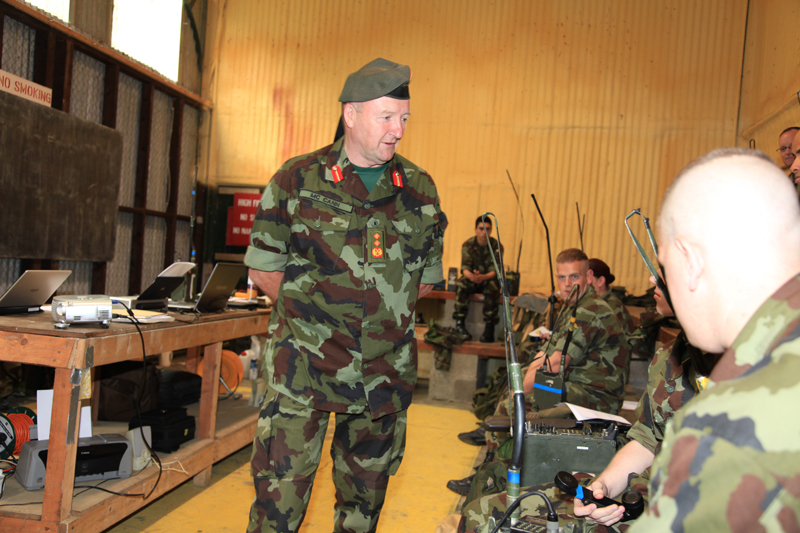
Chief of Staff visiting Army reservists on annual full-time training in the Glen of Imaal

In 1997, a steering group was convened by the Chief of Staff of the Irish Defence Forces to conduct a special study on the restructuring of the Defence Forces Reserve. The report was completed in May 1999. The Reserve Defence Forces was established on 1 October 2005 in line with the recommendations of this report, and as part of a wider restructure of the Defence Forces from 2000 onwards.

An RDF Training Authority was established in the Defence Forces Training Centre (DFTC), which co-ordinates and conducts reserve training.

The Minister for Defence accepted the recommendations of a "Value for Money (VFM) Review of the Reserve Defence Force", published on 20 November 2012.

The Steering Committee recommended an Army Reserve and Naval Service Reserve based on a total strength ceiling of 4,069 personnel (3,869 personnel Army Reserve and 200 personnel Naval Service Reserve), subject to existing organisational structures being revised.

In order to provide sufficient paid training days to sustain this strength, the Steering Committee recommended the withdrawal of gratuities from members of the Reserve and a re-allocation of the budgetary provision for gratuities of €0.9 million to provide sufficient paid training days for members of the Reserve.

The key points are;

- A new "Single Force" concept will see Army units having Reserve sub-units attached, rather than separate stand-alone Reserve units.
- A geographic spread for the Reserve will be achieved between existing Permanent Defence Force locations and the retention of 16 external locations. This consolidation into an effective organisation will entail the amalgamation and closure of units throughout the country. Recruitment is also envisaged where this is necessary to achieve the numbers required in particular locations.
- The strength of the Army Reserve and Naval Service Reserve was reduced from its previous establishment of 9,692 personnel to 4,069 personnel. This will be achieved through natural turnover. Implementation of the new organisational structures will require participation and flexibility from existing Reserve personnel.
- The Naval Service Reserve will consist of 200 personnel and be based in four locations.
- The number of Army personnel available to work full-time with the Army Reserve and Naval Service Reserve is being reduced from the current 261 Army personnel to 57 full-time Army personnel. Additional support will be provided by Army units.
- Implementation of the re-organisation, including regulatory provision for the new Reserve organisation, will be progressed in tandem with the broader re-organisation of the Army. As with the Army, there will be an implementation process to achieve the transition from current structures to the new structures. In the intervening period, the military authorities will ensure the continuity of Reserve training.

The representative body for all ranks of the RDF is the Reserve Defence Forces Representative Association (RDFRA).

== Earlier reserve forces: LSF, LDF, FCA ==
During The Emergency (Second World War), the civilian reserve was known as the Local Security Force, then as the Local Defence Force, which subsequently became translated into Irish as An Fórsa Cosanta Áitiúl (or FCA). The FCA persisted as such until 2005 until reorganised and renamed as above.

== Current tasks ==
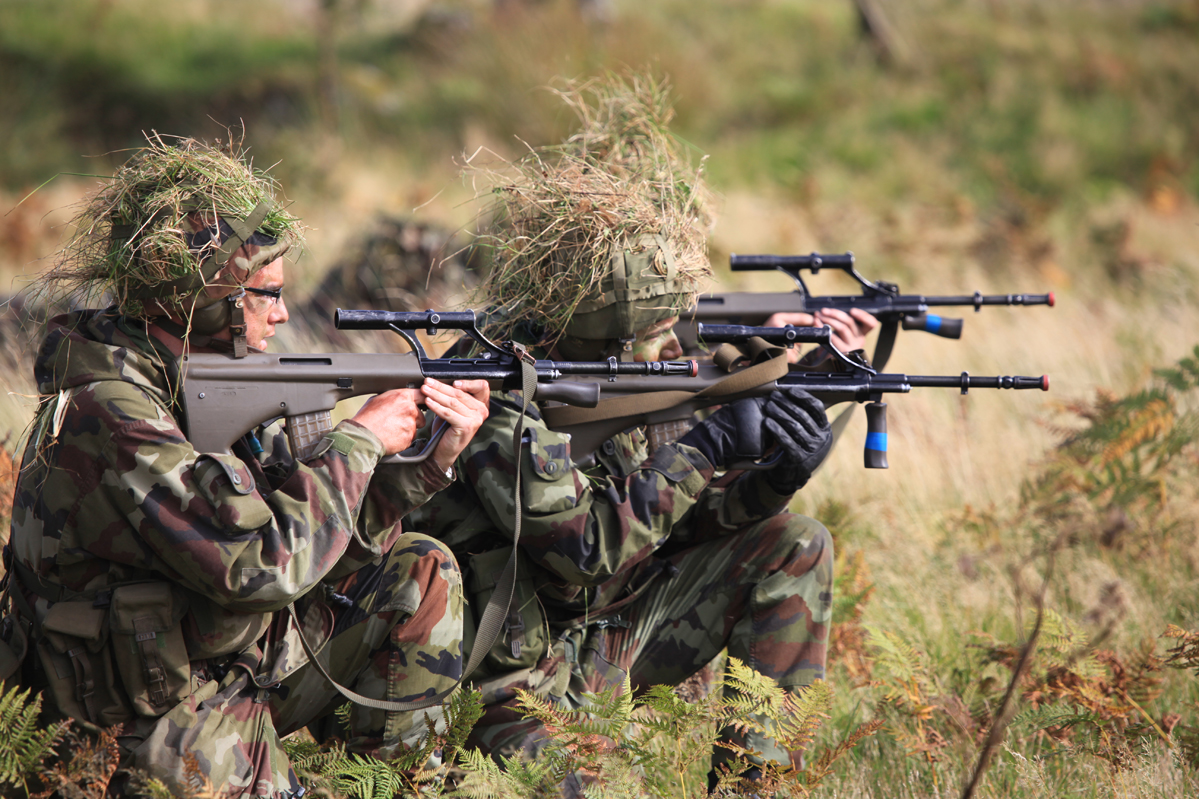
Irish Army Reserve assessment training

The roles of the Reserve are those assigned to the Defence Forces:

- Defence against armed aggression
- Aid to the Civil Power (ATCP)
- Participation in Peace Support Operations
- Fishery Protection
- Other duties which may be assigned by Government.

Tasks are assigned to the Reserve to support the Defence Forces in fulfilling its roles. These include;

- Augmentation/reinforcement of the PDF.
- Provision of logistic support.
- Provision of armed escorts.
- Guard duty.
- Augmentation of Naval Service on fishery protection patrols and overseas visits.
- Port security, sighting reports, information-gathering.
- Staffing of Military Posts during periods of PDF deployment.
- Radiological Monitoring.
- Ceremonial duties at national and local events.

As well as to augment the Permanent Defence Forces in times of crisis or emergency, where Reservists are liable to be called up on permanent service within the state or outside it by the Minister for Defence or Government of Ireland in accordance with the Defence Acts.

Naval Service Reserve personnel were deployed on naval vessels in order to assist in Ireland's response to the coronavirus pandemic (COVID-19) in early 2020, whereby naval vessels formed part of testing centres in support of the HSE.

== Future ==
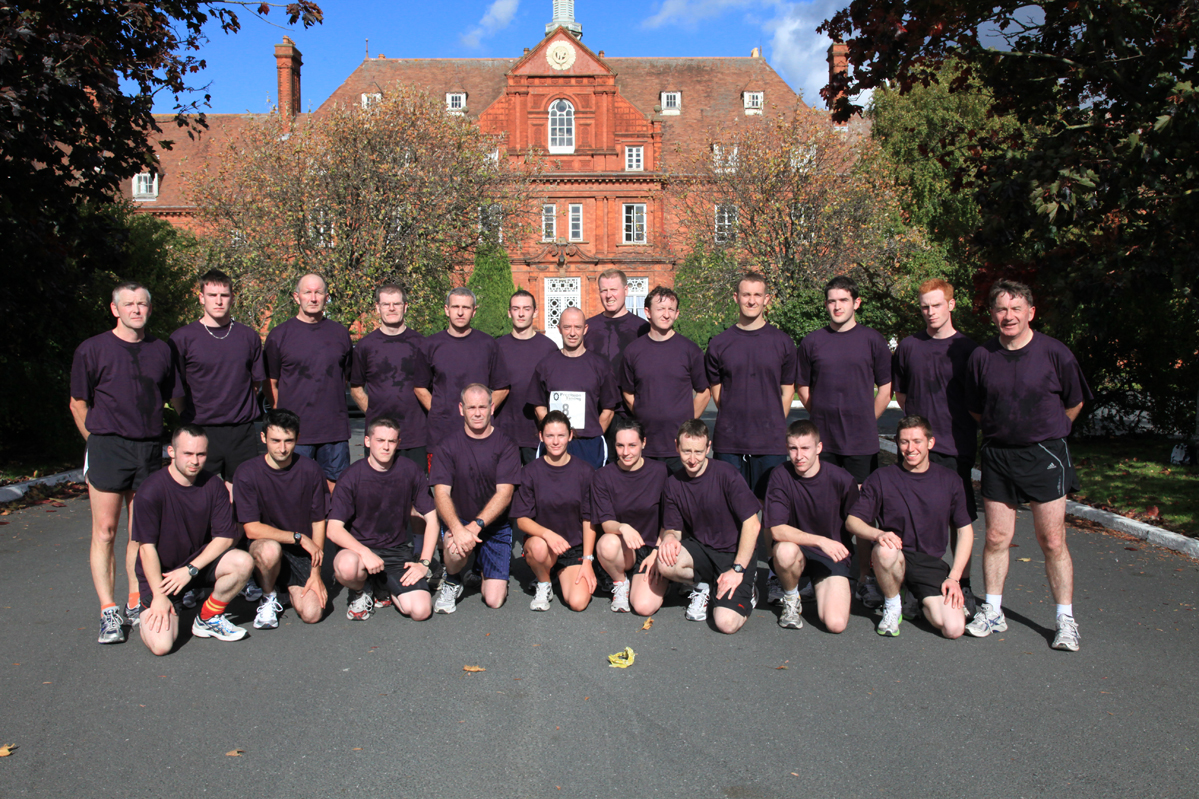
Personnel from the Reserve forces following completion of annual 10 km An Cosantóir road race in 2014, McKee Barracks

The 2015 White Paper on Defence and the 2016 Programme for Government provide that the overall establishment of the Army Reserve (AR) and the Naval Service Reserve (NSR) be set at 4,169 personnel, consisting of 3,869 Army Reservists and the expansion of the establishment of the four Naval Service Reserve Units from 200 to 300 personnel. In 2016, recruitment campaigns and training were stepped up to meet these targets.

=== Female personnel ===
While the number of female personnel in the Permanent Defence Forces is at a low 6% (which recruitment is trying to increase), the number of female Reservists is higher, with 16.3% female personnel in the Army Reserve and 22% female personnel in the Naval Service Reserve.

=== 'Specialist Reserve' and overseas deployments ===
Prof Michael Mulqueen, in his 2009 book titled Re-evaluating Irish National Security Policy: Affordable Threats? states "The emphasis on overseas service had also been extended to the Army Reserve. A reorganisation plan envisaged 2,600 of the State's 12,000 Reservists being offered training up to the level of full-time soldiers, in preparation for overseas service. Reservists would also conduct, on a routine basis, ATCP operations. This seemed to suggest that in time, while the permanent Army concentrated on overseas missions [...] part-time soldiers would take their place in duties defined broadly enough to encompass everything from flood relief to anti-terrorist patrols."

The White Paper on Defence published in 2015 by the Irish government sets out plans for a "Specialist Reserve" to be created within the Defence Forces, to augment professional skills that may not be readily available within the PDF, such as ICT, medical, ordnance, heavy vehicle mechanics and engineering professionals. The White Paper expects that personnel seconded to the Specialist Reserve could, subject to their availability, be integrated with their PDF counterparts and take part in live operations, including overseas missions, similar to other European reserve military forces.

In June 2021, Minister for Foreign Affairs and Minister for Defence Simon Coveney brought amendments to the Defence Acts through the Oireachtas which enable overseas service for Defence Forces Reservists in legislation.

== Popular culture ==
Components of the Reserve Defence Forces (and previously the FCÁ) were involved as extras in the filming of the D-Day landing battle scenes in Saving Private Ryan – as well as battle scenes in Braveheart, My Boy Jack and other feature films.

== External links and sources ==
- Irish Defence Forces website – Reserve
