= European Organisation of Military Associations and Trade Unions =

Non-governmental organization

EUROMIL
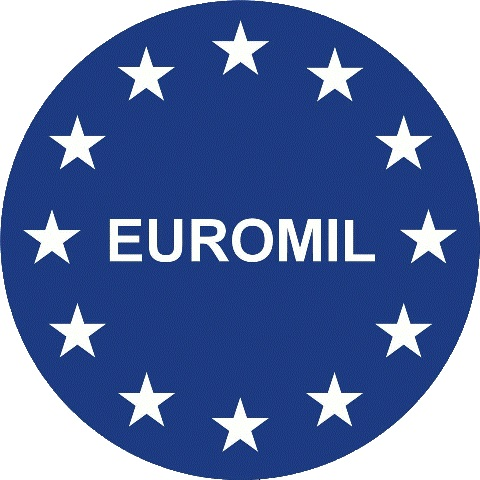
- Formation: 1972
- Type: non-governmental organisation
- Headquarters: Brussels, Belgium
- Members: 34 associations from 22 countries
- Official language: English
- Website: http://www.euromil.org/

The European Organisation of Military Associations and Trade Unions (EUROMIL) is a politically independent, non-profit umbrella organisation of free, democratic associations of military personnel in Europe.

Founded in 1972, EUROMIL has a membership of 30 associations from more than 20 European countries, and thereby representing nearly 500,000 individuals.

Its mission is to promote and defend the socio-professional interests of all ranks and status groups of soldiers and their families at European level. Moreover, EUROMIL aims at securing and advancing the human rights and fundamental freedoms of soldiers by monitoring European developments and advocating the association's interests.

EUROMIL's headquarters, an international secretariat, is located in Brussels, Belgium. Its main role is to facilitate the exchange of information, in particular best practices, between member associations.

Specifically, EUROMIL engages with the European Committee of Social Rights of the Council of Europe to ensure states' compliance with the European Social Charter. Furthermore, EUROMIL supports its member associations in the United Nations' UPR Procedure, aimed at reviewing human rights situations in Member States.

The organisation maintains formal contacts with the Council of Europe, the European Union Institutions, the North Atlantic Treaty Organization Parliamentary Assembly, the Organization for Security and Co-operation in Europe (OSCE) and the European Trade Union Confederation (ETUC).

EUROMIL's partners are, amongst others, the Kangaroo Group, Friends of Europe and the European Movement International (EMI).
