= St Bricin's Military Hospital =

- Defence Forces
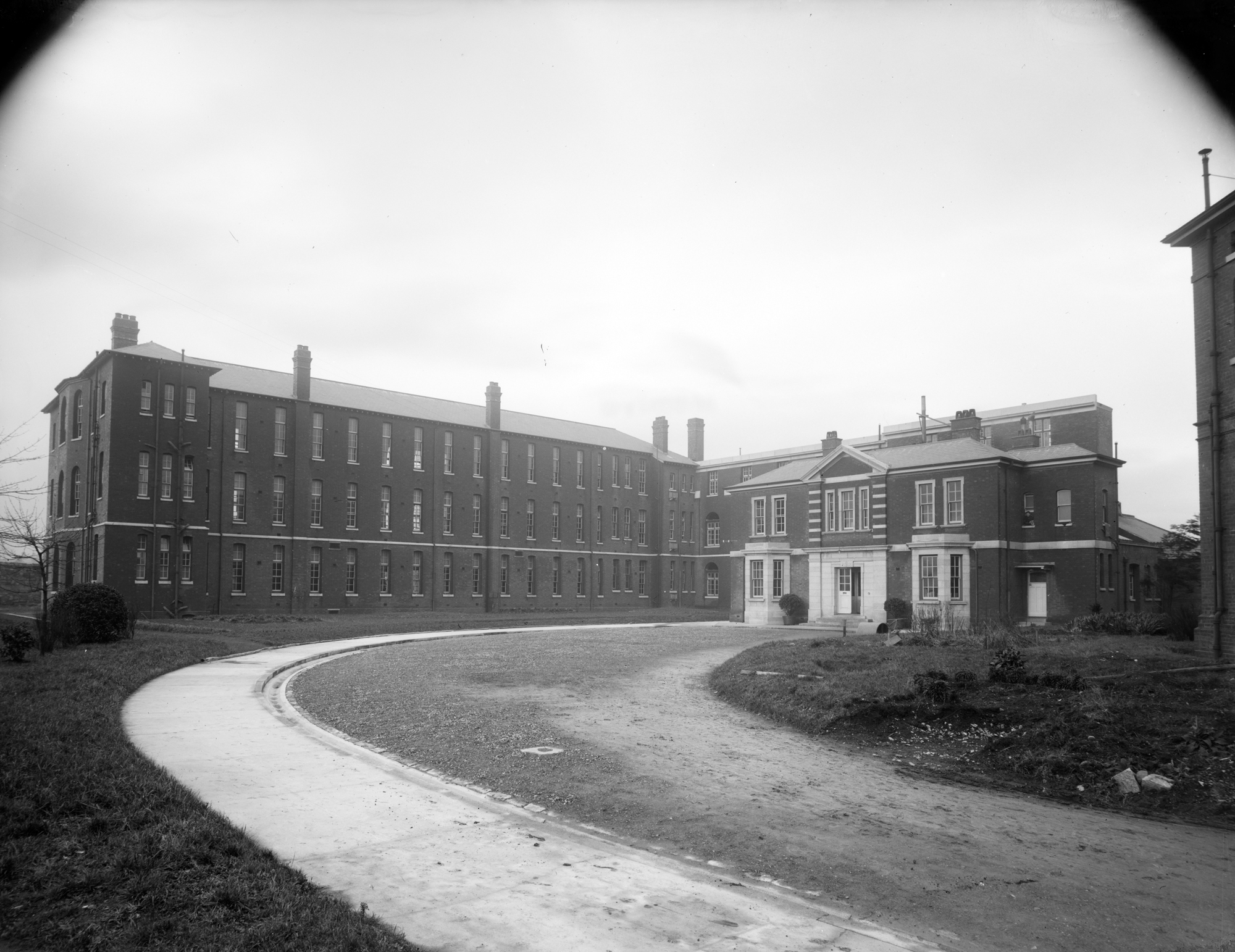
- The hospital, circa 1907-1913.

- Location of hospital on map of Dublin

Geography
- Location: Arbour Hill, Dublin, Ireland
- Coordinates: 53°21′05″N 6°17′30″W

Organisation
- Type: Military
- Affiliated university: None

Links
- Lists: Hospitals in the Republic of Ireland

St Bricin's Military Hospital (Irish: Ospidéal Míleata Naomh Bricin) is a former military hospital in Arbour Hill, an inner city area of Dublin, Ireland. Originally founded as Arbour Hill Military Hospital, it was built in stages from 1902, and served members of the Irish Defence Forces while operating under the administration of the Army's Medical Corps.

== History ==
The hospital was founded as Arbour Hill Military Hospital and built in three stages from 1902 replacing an older military hospital on the site. Designed by the Royal Engineers of the British Army, it was named the King George V Hospital (KGVH) to mark the 1911 coronation and Irish visit of the king before it opened in 1913 and was administered by the Royal Army Medical Corps (RAMC). It was part of an extensive complex of British military and support facilities west of Dublin city centre for the British garrison in Ireland. This included the Royal Barracks, to which it was connected by a tunnel via Arbour Hill Detention Barracks (built to hold military offenders), Marlborough Barracks, Montpelier Hill Barracks and Isolation Hospital, and the Royal Irish Constabulary depot in the Phoenix Park.

The hospital was transferred to the authorities of the new Irish Free State in 1922. It was renamed St Bricin's Military Hospital after Saint Bricín of Tomregan, because of his skill as a surgeon in 7th century Ireland. Together with military medical facilities in Cork, Athlone and the Curragh, St. Bricin's Military Hospital was used by the Irish Army Medical Corps to provide medical care to service members. In 2005, consideration was given to making the hospital available for public use to ease pressure on accident and emergency departments.

As of 2015, the facility was providing limited general practitioner (GP) and out-patient services to members of the Defence Forces and there were no in-patient facilities at the hospital. The facility closed and a marching-out ceremony was held in mid-2026.

== See also ==
- List of Irish military installations
