= Ombudsman for the Defence Forces =

The Ombudsman for the Defence Forces (ODF) is an independent office tasked with investigating complaints made by current and former members of the Irish Defence Forces of Ireland.

The Ombudsman for the Defence Forces was established as an independent statutory body as a result of the Ombudsman (Defence Forces) Act 2004. It is charged with dealing with complaints made by current and former members of the Defence Forces – including the Army, Naval Service, Air Corps and Reserve Defence Forces. The ODF handles complaints concerning actions taken by serving or former military personnel of the Defence Forces (of all ranks) or civil servants (Department of Defence) where there is an adverse effect, in cases where existing internal grievance procedures have either been exhausted, the complainant believes have not resulted in a fair outcome or their complaint has not been appropriately dealt with internally within 28 days.

To protect the confidentiality of the complainants and complaints and the integrity of the complaints procedure, The Freedom of Information Act (FOI) does not apply to the Ombudsman for the Defence Forces.

Staff at the Office of the Ombudsman for the Defence Forces consists of one:

- Investigation Officer (Assistant Principal Officer)
- Case Manager (Higher Executive Officer)
- Administrative Assistant (Clerical Officer)

Former Court of Appeal judge, Alan Mahon, is the current Ombudsman, appointed by the President on the recommendation of Government in July 2018. The Ombudsman is selected through an open competition run by the Commission for Public Service Appointments.

== See also ==
- Fiosrú – the Office of the Police Ombudsman
