= Defence Forces (Ireland) =

Combined military forces of the Republic of Ireland

Irish Defence Forces
- Óglaigh na hÉireann; Fórsaí Cosanta
- Irish Defence Forces badge
- Founded: 1 October 1924; 102 years ago
- Current form: collective armed forces
- Service branches: Irish Army; Irish Naval Service; Irish Air Corps; Reserve Defence Forces; Army Reserve; Naval Service Reserve
- Headquarters: DFHQ McKee Barracks, Dublin
- Website: Official website

Leadership
- Supreme Commander: Catherine Connolly
- Minister for Defence: Helen McEntee
- Chief of Staff: Lieutenant General Rossa Mulcahy

Personnel
- Military age: 18–39 (of enlistment, as of 2026)
- Conscription: no
- Active personnel: 7,767 (as of 2026; Establishment: 9,739)
- Reserve personnel: 1,811 (as of 2026; Establishment: 4,069)
- Deployed personnel: 428 troops, 17 missions (as of March 2025)

Expenditure
- Budget: €1.5bn (2024)
- Percent of GDP: 0.23% (2022)

Related articles
- Ranks: Military ranks of Ireland

The Irish Defence Forces (Irish: Fórsaí Cosanta, officially styled Óglaigh na hÉireann) (Note: Óglaigh na hÉireann derives its origins from the Irish Volunteers. Whilst the Irish for Defence Forces is Fórsaí Cosanta, as Ó Cearúil (1999) points out, the Defence Forces are officially styled Óglaigh na hÉireann. Fórsaí Cosanta is used in other contexts (e.g. Rialacháin Fhórsaí Cosanta is Defence Force Regulations), as well as having a defined meaning in legislation.) are the armed forces of the Republic of Ireland. Full-time salaried personnel are collectively known as the Permanent Defence Force (PDF); they encompass the Army, the Naval Service, and the Air Corps. The Permanent Defence Force is supported by volunteers of the Reserve Defence Force (RDF), consisting of the First Line Reserve (FLR) and the Second Line Reserve (SLR), the latter of which contains the Army Reserve (AR) and the Naval Service Reserve (NSR). In terms of personnel numbers, on 31 January 2026, the Minister for Defence confirmed a strength of 7,767 for the Permanent Defence Force, 204 for the First Line Reserve, and 1,607 for the Second Line Reserve, the latter consisting of 1,473 Army Reserve and 134 Naval Service Reserve. This equates to a ratio of Permanent Defence Force to Reserve Defence Forces of 4.3:1.

The Supreme Commander of the Irish Defence Forces is the President of Ireland. All Irish Defence Forces officers hold their commission from the President of Ireland. In practice, the Minister for Defence acts on the President of Ireland's behalf, and reports to the Government of Ireland. The Council of Defence advises the Minister for Defence on the business of the Department of Defence.

In June 2025, there were 7,531 permanent personnel in the Irish Defence Forces, out of an established strength of 9,739, a decrease from September 2020 when there were 8,529 personnel, comprising 6,878 Army, 752 Air Corps and 899 Naval Service personnel. As of August 2024, there were also 1,720 personnel in the Reserve Defence Force out of an established strength of 4,069.

== Role ==
The Irish state has a long-standing policy of non-belligerence in armed conflicts, including neutrality in World War II. Ireland's military capabilities are modest; however, the state has a long history of involvement in United Nations peacekeeping operations. Functions of the Defence Forces include:

- Preparation for the defence of the state against armed attack.
- Assisting the police force, the Garda Síochána, including the protection of the internal security of the state.
- Peacekeeping, crisis management, and humanitarian relief operations in support of the United Nations.
- Policing the fisheries, in accordance with the state's obligations under European Union agreements.
- Miscellaneous civil contingency duties requested by the government, such as search and rescue, air ambulance provision, providing secure air transport for ministers, assistance in the event of natural and other disasters, ensuring the maintenance of essential services, and assisting in dealing with oil pollution at sea.

== History ==
The Irish Defence Forces trace their origins to the Irish Volunteers, founded in 1913. Their official Irish-language title, Óglaigh na hÉireann, is taken from the equivalent Irish-language title of the Irish Volunteers, as are their cap badge and the buttons worn on ceremonial uniforms (the buttons are still marked with the initials "IV").

The Irish Volunteers were central to the Easter Rising staged in April 1916. After the rising, the Volunteers gave allegiance to the First Dáil, the parliament of the revolutionary Irish Republic. At this time, the Volunteers became known as the Irish Republican Army (IRA). From 1919 onwards, the IRA waged a guerrilla campaign against British rule in Ireland that is now known as the War of Independence.

A truce in July 1921 brought hostilities to an end; the Anglo-Irish Treaty was signed on 6 December. The Provisional Government was then constituted on 14 January 1922. The IRA was divided between those who accepted the decision of the Dáil to ratify the Treaty and those who did not; consequently, both civil war and re-occupation by the British became possible. In February 1922, the pro-treaty IRA became the National Army of the Irish Free State. With declining relations between the remaining units of the anti-treaty IRA and the newly recruited pro-treaty National Army, the Irish Civil War broke out on 28 June 1922. It ended in victory for the National Army when, on 24 May 1923, the anti-treaty IRA Chief of Staff, Frank Aiken ordered his volunteers to dump arms.

On 3 August 1923, the new state passed the Defence Forces (Temporary Provisions) Act, raising "an armed force to be called Oglaigh na hEireann [sic] (hereinafter referred to as the Forces) consisting of such number of officers, non-commissioned officers, and men as may from time to time be provided by the Oireachtas, the new parliament of the Irish Free State." The Forces were established on 1 October 1924.

The state was officially neutral during World War II but declared an official state of emergency on 2 September 1939, and the Army was mobilised. As the Emergency progressed, more and newer equipment was purchased for the rapidly expanding force from Britain and the United States, as well as some manufactured at home. For the duration of the Emergency, Ireland, while formally neutral, tacitly supported the Allies in several ways. Allied aircraft were allowed to access the Atlantic Ocean via the Donegal Corridor. German military personnel were interned in the Curragh along with the belligerent powers' servicemen, whereas Allied airmen and sailors who crashed in Ireland were very often repatriated, usually by secretly moving them across the border to Northern Ireland. G2, the Army's intelligence section, played a vital role in the detection and arrest of German spies, such as Hermann Görtz.

In September 1946, the Naval Service was established as Ireland's maritime force and as a permanent component of the Defence Forces.

Ireland became a member of the United Nations in 1955. The first contribution to peacekeeping was in 1958 when Army officers were assigned to the United Nations Observation Group in Lebanon (UNOGIL). Since 1958, the Defence Forces have had a continuous presence in armed United Nations peacekeeping operations, except between May 1974 and May 1978 (although they did retain overseas unarmed observer missions during this period). The first armed peacekeeping mission was to the Operation des Nations Unies au Congo (ONUC) in 1960. During the ONUC mission, a company from the Irish Army were involved in a battle at Jadotville, in which the Irish held out against a larger Katangese force. A memorial to Irish personnel who served as United Nations peacekeepers was unveiled in 2009 in the town of Fermoy, recording that there were a total of ninety Irish fatalities while on active service with the UN until that date.

During the Troubles, the period of civil conflict centred on Northern Ireland from 1969 to 1998, the Defence Forces deployed to aid the Garda Síochána. Troops were deployed for duty to the border areas, new border military posts were established, and in 1973, new permanent border units were established. In 1969-70, there were proposals considered for a limited military intervention in Northern Ireland to protect the nationalist community, known as Exercise Armageddon, but it was seen to be unworkable and was not adopted by the cabinet. Although units were moved to the border region in 1969–70 during the Battle of the Bogside, in order to provide medical support to those wounded in the fighting. In 1974, troops were deployed to maximum-security prisons in Portlaoise and Limerick where IRA prisoners were detained. Armed troops were deployed in 1976 to all major post offices during a three-month national bank strike. In 1978, cash-in-transit escorts were established to protect large cash movements throughout the state, continuing until 2014. The Central Bank of Ireland had the Government put in place contingency plans to provide armed Defence Force security for major Irish banks over public order fears if a cash shortage was triggered during the 2008 financial crisis. Tasks in military aid to the civil power continue today, but no longer to the same degree or intensity.

== Funding and development ==
Defence expenditure (excluding pensions) from 1999 in €m, as a percentage of gross domestic product (GDP)
year	defence expenditure (gross)	gross domestic product	as % of GDP
1999	760	92,669	0.82%
2000	820	108,400	0.76%
2001	731	122,010	0.60%
2002	725	135,956	0.53%
2003	711	145,534	0.49%
2004	733	156,189	0.47%
2005	759	170,231	0.45%
2006	772	184,914	0.42%
2007	817	197,130	0.41%
2008	880	187,620	0.47%
2009	804	169,786	0.47%
2010	744	167,674	0.44%
2011	704	170,951	0.41%
2012	657	175,104	0.38%
2013	667	179,616	0.37%
2014	673	195,148	0.34%
2015	671	262,853	0.26%
2016	671	270,809	0.25%
2017	681	300,387	0.23%
2018	701	326,986	0.21%
2019	756	356,051	0.21%
2020	781		0.27%
2021	755		
2022	802		
2023	872		
2024	908		
2025	995		
2026			

In 2020, the total (gross) defence budget for the Republic of Ireland was €1.04 billion, the first time the state budget exceeded 1 billion euros. This included €780.4 million on military (defence) expenditure (€22.3 million increase from 2019), and €259.1 million for army pensions (€10 million increase over 2019). Department of Defence spending was 0.27% of gross domestic product (GDP) in 2020, and 0.29% in 2019.

In 2022, the defence sector budget was €1.1 billion, and in July of that year, the Irish government minister Simon Coveney announced plans to increase this to €1.5 billion by 2028. As part of the plans to move to 'Level of Ambition 2' (LOA2) in 2022, the number of civil and military personnel was proposed to be increased by 2,000, from its existing establishment of 9,500 to 11,500. Planning also began for improvements in radar capabilities. The Defence Forces specified the procurement of an integrated radar system for land, sea and air function, and that the Army's structures and capabilities would be redesigned to meet 'international best practice'. The plan also proposed the establishment of an Office of Reserve Affairs to design a Reserve Defence Force 'regeneration plan'.

The projected budget for 2024 was €1.5 billion, including an extra €21 million over previous expenditure, and €34 million in capital expenditure on top of the original capital ceiling of the National Development Plan. This also included a budget for an additional 400 enlisted personnel during 2024.

== Organisation ==
The Irish Defence Forces are organised under the Chief of Staff, supported by Deputy Chief of Staff Operations, and the Deputy Chief of Staff Support. They consist of a Permanent Defence Force (PDF), which is a standing force and provides the main capability for military operations, and the Reserve Defence Forces (RDF), military reserve forces which support the PDF if necessary. The PDF is organised into three service branches: the Army, the Naval Service, and the Air Corps. The RDF may be further subdivided into a First Line Reserve (FLR) and a Second Line Reserve; the First Line Reserve comprises former members of the Permanent Defence Force, while the Second Line Reserve comprises an Army Reserve and a Naval Service Reserve (both recruited directly from the civilian population). A reorganisation of the RDF in 2013, referred to as the 'single force concept', has resulted in units of the RDF being embedded within units of the PDF, rather than existing entirely in parallel as a separate reserve force; this moves away from the traditional approach of the RDF being considered a fourth service branch of the Defence Forces.

In January 2022, the Commission on the Defence Forces recommended the establishment of an 'Information Command', under the command of a general, to handle cyberattacks and misinformation.

=== Army ===
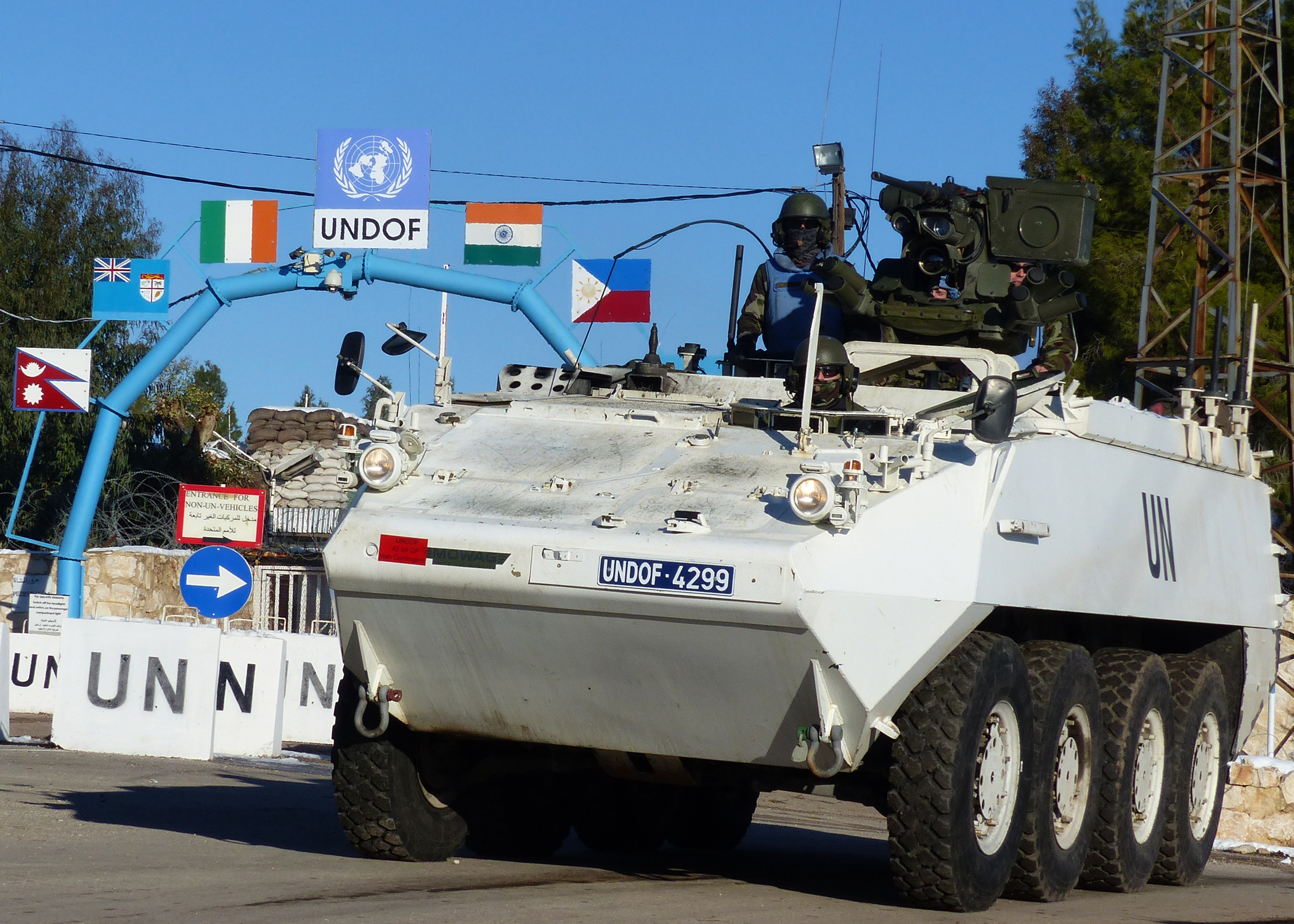
An Irish Army Cavalry Corps Mowag Piranha close reconnaissance vehicle (CRV) on United Nations (UN) patrol in Syria.

As of December 2023, the Army had approximately 6,136 active personnel, with 1,351 personnel in the Army Reserve. Up to late 2012, the army had three brigades: 1 Southern, 2 Eastern and 4 Western; in 2012, 4 Western Brigade stood down at its HQ, Custume Barracks, Athlone. The state is now divided into two Brigade areas for administrative and operational reasons, with the former 4 Western Brigade split between the other two brigades. In addition to the brigade structure, there is also the Defence Forces Training Centre, a logistics base in the Curragh.

The two-brigade structure envisages distinct operational areas of responsibility for each of the brigades. The 1st Brigade has primary responsibility for operational tasks in the southern region, while the 2nd Brigade leads on operational tasks in the eastern and western regions. Practical operational considerations dictate the requirement to outline operational areas of responsibility. The brigade structure is based on strengthened combat and combat-support elements, together with streamlined combat-service-support elements.

The Army has nine specialist corps, each designated as either combat, combat support or combat service support. These are the Infantry Corps, Artillery Corps, Cavalry Corps, Engineer Corps, Ordnance Corps, Medical Corps, Transport Corps, Military Police Corps, and the Communications and Information Services Corps. In the case of corps which support the infantry, a Corps Director and staff are provided to coordinate the purchase of specialised equipment, the execution of specialised training, and other necessary activities.

Irish infantry are equipped with assault rifles, machine guns, grenade launchers, hand grenades, and anti-tank weapons. Most weapons used by their defence forces follow NATO standards and are purchased from abroad, with Ireland having a very limited arms industry. The Army has light armoured vehicles, with the primary vehicle being the MOWAG Piranha, armed with machine guns. Its artillery capabilities consist of 120mm mortars and towed 105mm light guns.

The Army Ranger Wing (ARW) is the special forces of Ireland. They are based at the Curragh.

=== Air Corps ===
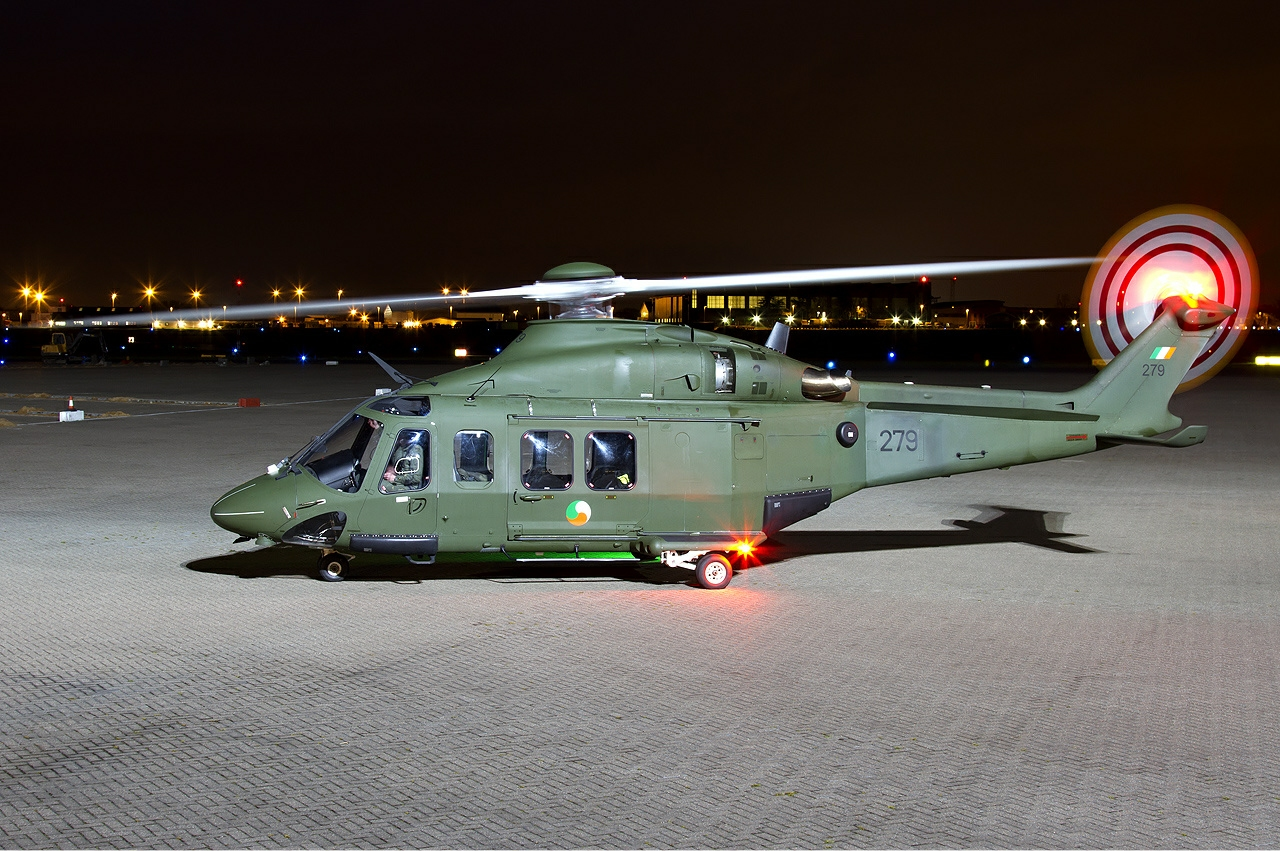
Irish Air Corps AgustaWestland AW139 helicopter.

The Irish Air Corps (IAC) is the corps-sized air component of the Irish Defence Forces. Its headquarters (HQ) and main operating base is Casement (Baldonnel) Aerodrome, south-west of Dublin. In terms of manpower, the IAC is the smallest of the branches of the Defence Forces, with approximately 689 personnel, and its primary roles are defined as:

1. Support of the Army
2. Support of the Naval Service
3. Aid to the civil power

There are two secondary roles:

1. Aid to the civil community
2. Aid to government departments

The Air Corps provides support to the Army and Naval Service, together with non-military air services such as the Emergency Aeromedical (air ambulance) Service, VIP transport, and search and rescue (SAR) (in support of Coast Guard search and rescue efforts). The Air Corps is unable to provide the traditional air force role of defending Irish airspace as it has no interceptor or fighter aircraft; however, its fixed-wing Pilatus PC-9M turboprop trainers can be armed with a pair of 2.75 inch (70 mm) rocket launcher pods, or a pair of 0.5 inch (12.7 mm) calibre FN HMG machine guns.

The main fixed-wing aviation assets of the Air Corps include three Airbus C295 aircraft: two maritime patrol (MPA) versions equipped with detection systems to assist the Naval Service in patrolling Ireland's territorial waters and exclusive economic zone, as well as one transport variant for troop lifting, cargo logistics, medical evacuations, and other utility missions. These aircraft are also used for high-altitude, low-opening parachuting (HALO) by the Army's ARW. Additionally, the Air Corps operates four Pilatus PC-12NG aircraft; three of the spectre variant, and one utility variant. They are used for logistics, air ambulance, transport and ISR (Intelligence, Surveillance and Reconnaissance) roles. Training utilises eight (originally six in 2004) Pilatus PC-9M turbo-prop aircraft. Synthetic training consists of two simulators; one PC-9M, and a multi-crew simulator.

Rotary-wing capability consists of six AgustaWestland AW139 utility helicopters. These are used in support of the ARW, Naval Service, and Garda Síochána operations, and are the only helicopters within the state capable of flying at night in mountain terrain using night-vision technology. Two Eurocopter EC135 light utility helicopters (which can be used as sniper platforms by the ARW) are used for training pilots and for air-ambulance missions.

Weapons systems consist of enabling the eight Pilatus PC-9 turboprop trainers to be equipped with rocket pods and FN .50 cal heavy machine guns. It's AW139 are capable of being armed with FN MAG medium machine guns.

The Air Corps conducted over 130 maritime surveillance patrol flights in 2019, and provided medical support to the Health Service Executive (HSE)) for patients by conducting over 233 Emergency Aeromedical Service missions, and 32 inter-hospital air ambulance transfers.

=== Naval Service ===
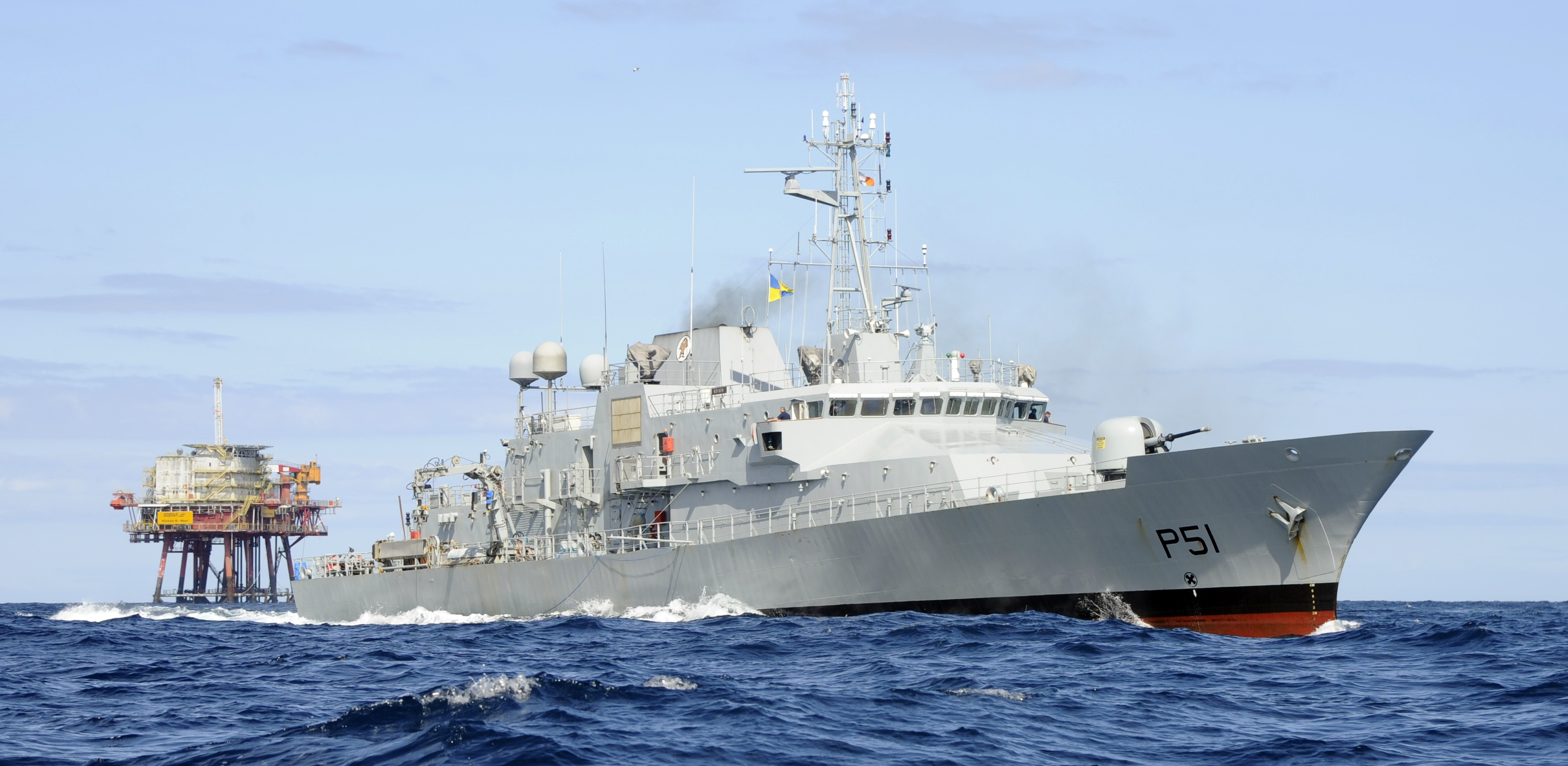
Naval Service vessel LÉ Róisín.

The Irish Naval Service maintains a complement of approximately 725 active personnel and 97 reserve personnel, and is tasked with patrolling Irish territorial waters as well as the Irish Conservation Box, a large area of sea in which fishing is restricted to preserve fish numbers. It is tasked with enforcing this European-Union-protected area and thus serves the EU as well as Ireland. Together with the Air Corps and Customs, it has intercepted a number of vessels carrying narcotics to and from Ireland.

The Naval Service has eight patrol vessels (2xP50, 4xP60, 2xP70) which are operated in support of the service's primary roles, inflatable seagoing craft, and training vessels. It maintains highly-trained armed boarding parties that can seize a vessel if necessary. In 2019, for example, there were approximately 780 boarding operations and 12 vessels were detained . The service's specialised diving unit is the Naval Service Diving Section.

The primary role is defined as "National Security", with secondary roles which include:

1. Fishery protection
2. Aid to the civil power
3. Drug interdiction
4. Maritime safety
5. Diving operations
6. Pollution control
7. Overseas mission support

=== Reserve Defence Forces ===
The Reserve Defence Forces (RDF) in its current form was established in October 2005 and comprises the First Line Reserve, Army Reserve (AR) and Naval Service Reserve (NSR). The RDF is a part-time, voluntary component of the Defence Forces in peacetime, supporting the Permanent Defence Forces (PDF) in its domestic roles and training alongside its professional full-time colleagues as part of the "Single Force Concept" whereby RDF units are integrated with their PDF counterparts, coming under the one command. As of January 2026, there were 1,811 reservists, consisting of 204 in the First Line Reserve, 1,473 in the Army Reserve, and 134 in the Naval Service Reserve.

== Bases ==
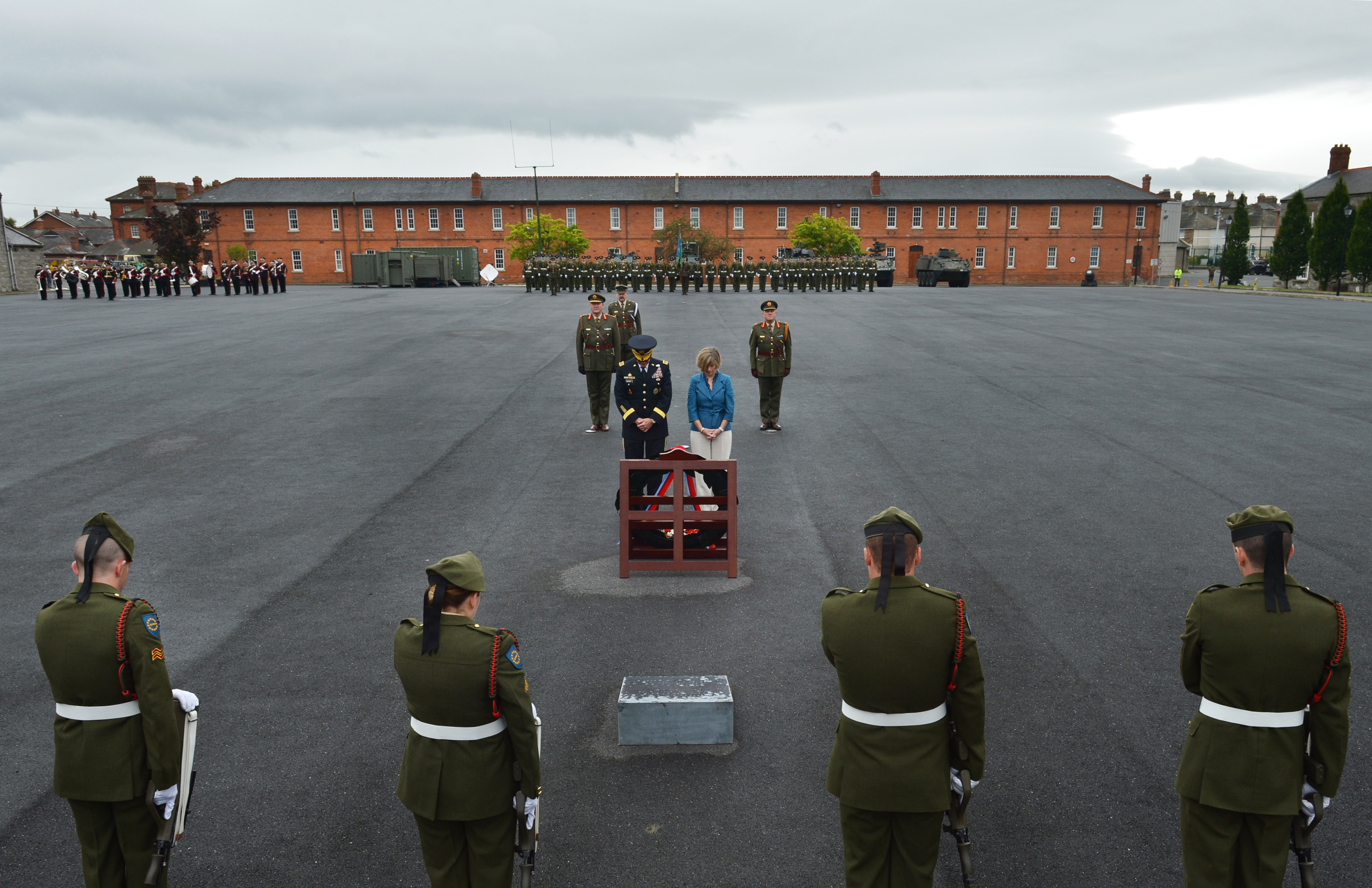
Ceremony at Cathal Brugha Barracks in Dublin.

The Irish Defence Forces operate a number of military bases:

Irish Defence Forces bases
Name	Location	Main occupant
Defence Forces Headquarters (DFHQ)	Newbridge	Department of Defence
Aiken Barracks	Dundalk	Army
Casement Aerodrome	Baldonnel	Air Corps
Cathal Brugha Barracks	Rathmines	Army
Collins Barracks	Cork	Army
Coolmoney Camp	Glen of Imaal	Army
Custume Barracks	Athlone	Army
Curragh Camp	Curragh	
Renmore Barracks	Galway	Army
Finner Camp	Ballyshannon	
Gormanston Camp	Gormanston	
Haulbowline Naval Base	Cork Harbour	Naval Service
Kilbride Camp	Kilbride	
Lynch Camp	Kilworth	
McKee Barracks	Dublin	Army
Sarsfield Barracks	Limerick	Army
St Bricin's Military Hospital	Dublin	
Stephens Barracks	Kilkenny	Army

== Current overseas deployments ==
As of March 2025, there were 428 Irish Defence Forces personnel deployed on overseas missions and locations in 17 missions. The missions were:

Irish Defence Forces overseas deployments
organisation	area	name	deployed
United Nations	Middle East	UNTSO	13
United Nations	Lebanon	UNIFIL	350
United Nations	Syria	UNDOF	3
European Union	Bosnia and Herzegovina	EUFOR	5
NATO	Kosovo	KFOR	13
European Union	Italy	EUNAVFOR MED IRINI	4
OSCE	Austria	Irish Representative at OSCE Headquarters	1
United Nations	Belgium	Irish EU military staff	8
European Union	Germany	EU Battlegroup	14
United Nations	USA	Irish UN Delegation Military Adviser	1
OSCE	Austria	Irish OSCE Delegation Military Adviser	1
European Union	Belgium	Military representative to EU	4
NATO	Belgium	Liaison Officer of Ireland to NATO	4
European Union	Belgium	EU Operation Althea	1
NATO	Belgium	Irish Liaison Officer to SHAPE & Military Co-Op Division	1
United Nations	Uganda	UNMAS	1
European Union	Germany	EUMAM UA	4

== Representative associations ==
The interests of members of the Irish Defence Forces are represented by a number of representative associations, similar to trade unions (which Irish military personnel are banned from joining). Comissioned officers of the Permanent Defence Force are represented by the Representative Association of Commissioned Officers (RACO), Rank-and-file (non-commissioned officers and enlisted personnel) members of the Permanent Defence Force are represented by the Permanent Defence Force Other Ranks Representative Association (PDFORRA), which is affiliated to the Irish Conference of Professional and Service Associations, and to the European Organisation of Military Associations, EUROMIL. In 2009, members of PDFORRA took part in an Irish Congress of Trade Unions protest against the government's handling of the post-2008 Irish economic downturn, at which time the Department of Defence warned that Defence Forces members could not take part in or sponsor any "public agitation", and that PDFORRA had "no express permission" for members to take part in the protests. All ranks of the Reserve Defence Force are represented by the Reserve Defence Force Representative Association (RDFRA).

Complaints concerning and made by serving and former members of the Defence Forces can be investigated by the independent Office of the Ombudsman for the Defence Forces (ODF), in cases where internal grievance procedures within the Defence Forces have been exhausted.

== See also ==
- Military awards and decorations of Ireland
- Irish security forces
- Organisation of National Ex-Servicemen
- Politics of the Republic of Ireland
- History of Ireland
- Irish neutrality
- Irish Army deafness claims – a series of 17,000 personal injury claims taken by members of the Irish Defence Forces.
- Defence Force (disambiguation)
- List of wars involving the Republic of Ireland
- List of countries by military expenditures
- Ireland–NATO relations
