= Defence Forces Training Centre =

Irish army training centre

- Irish: Airmheán Traenála Óglaigh na hÉireann
- Flag of the DFTC
- Country: Ireland
- Part of: Defence Forces
- Garrison/HQ: Curragh Camp, County Kildare; Glen of Imaal, County Wicklow
- Website: www.military.ie/en/who-we-are/army/defence-forces-training-centre/

Commanders
- General Officer Commanding: Brigadier General Louis Flynn

Insignia
- Recruit Colours

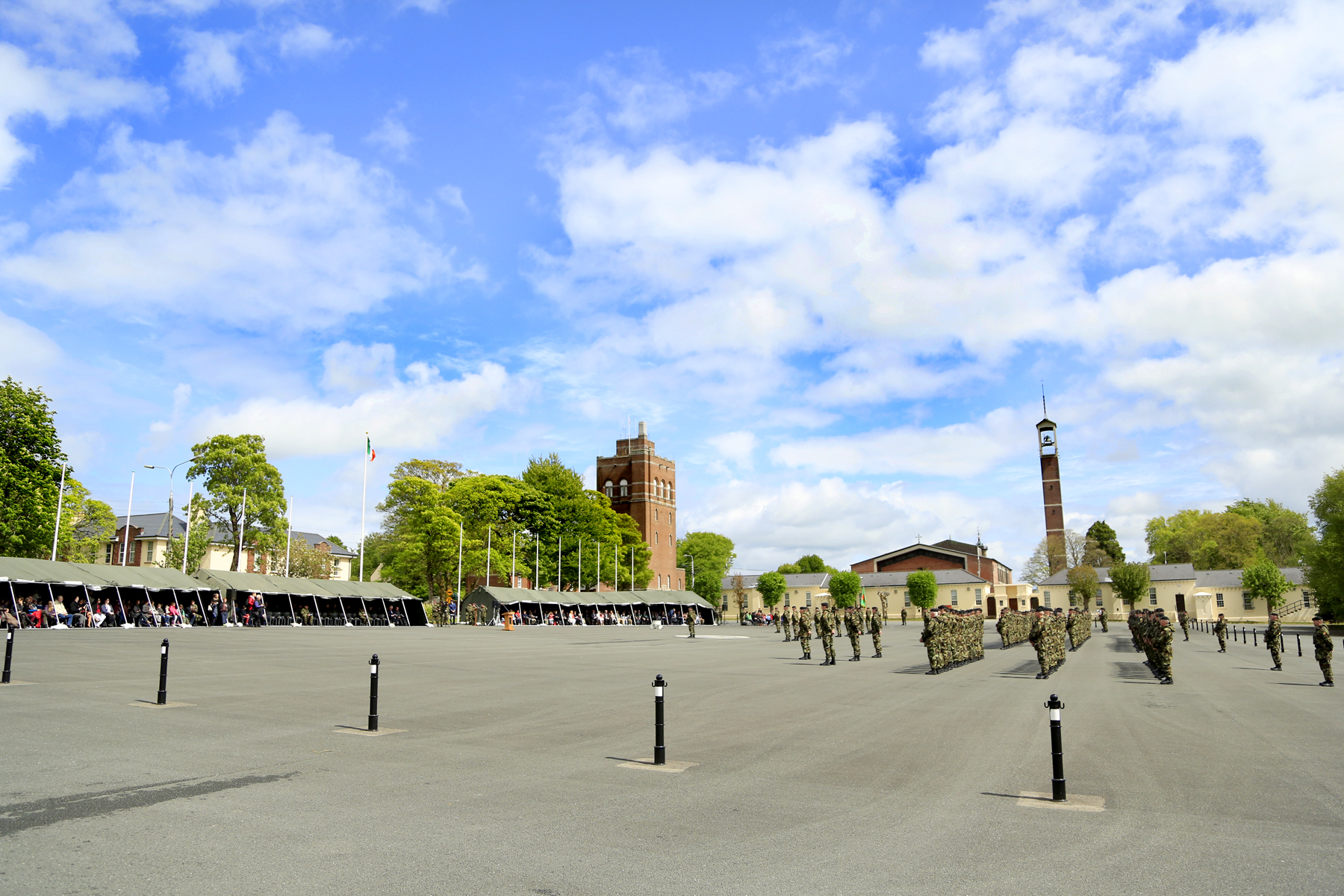
The Defence Forces Training Centre is based at the Curragh Camp in County Kildare.

The Defence Forces Training Centre (DFTC) (Irish: Airmheán Traenála Óglaigh na hÉireann, ATÓÉ) is the principal training centre for the Irish Army and other branches of the Irish Defence Forces, headquartered at the Curragh Camp that serves to provide education and training to recruits and officers. The DFTC also encompasses Glen of Imaal in County Wicklow, which is the primary artillery and anti-tank firing range for the army. It primarily comprises the Military College, with various schools, alongside additional specialised schools. It also hosts some specialised army units. DFTC is home to 2,000 military personnel.

== Training facilities ==
As part of the DFTC a number of training establishments operate to train new members of the Defence Forces.

=== Military College ===
The Military College is the principal educational facility for the training of cadets, NCOs and senior officers of the Defence Forces, and is the main training unit of the DFTC. Founded in 1930 the college comprises a number of constituent schools:

- Command and Staff School
- Recruit School
- Infantry School: consisting of Officer Training Wing, Noncommissioned Officers Training Wing and Infantry Weapons Wing
- Artillery School
- Cavalry School
- Military Administration School
- United Nations Training School Ireland
- Defence Forces Physical Education School

=== Other training schools ===
Other schools within the DFTC include:

- Communications and Information Services School
- Transport Vehicle Maintenance School
- Ordnance School
- Military Police School
- Engineer School
- Medical School
- Defence Forces School of Catering
- Intelligence School

== Units ==
The DFTC also plays host to a number of independent army units not formally part of the two brigade structure.

=== 1st Mechanised Infantry Company ===
Formally 'B Company' of the 3rd Infantry Battalion, the 1st Mechanised Infantry Company was established in 2012. Today it is an independent unit of the DFTC based at the Curragh that provides training in use and operation of the Mowag Armoured Personnel Carrier.

=== 1st Armoured Cavalry Squadron ===
The 1st Armoured Cavalry Squadron, based at the DFTC in the Curragh, was formed in 1998 through the merger of the 1st Armoured Car Squadron (founded in 1922 and as such the oldest cavalry unit in the Defence Forces) and the 1st Tank Squadron. The squadron is made up of three tank troops of four tanks each and one administrative unit.

A part of the Army's Cavalry Corps, the 1st Armoured Cavalry Squadron used the MOWAG Piranha IIIH as its main service vehicle.

=== Army Ranger Wing ===
The Army Ranger Wing (ARW) is the elite special forces unit of the Irish Defence Forces. Highly secretive in nature, the ARW has deployed overseas as part of Irish UN peacekeeping missions. Responsibilities include counter-terrorism, intelligence gathering, hostage rescue and close protection. The Army Rangers work with the Directorate of Military Intelligence (G2), the national intelligence service, and trains with the specialist firearms and tactics service of the Garda Síochána (national police), known as the Emergency Response Unit (ERU).

== See also ==
- Naval College (Ireland)
- Air Corps College (Ireland)
