= Michael Lynch (Irish Army officer) =

- Born: 24 April 1942; Dublin, Ireland
- Died: 24 October 2008 (aged 66)
- Military career
- Allegiance: Ireland
- Branch: Irish Army
- Service years: 1961–1998
- Rank: Commandant
- Conflicts: UNFICYP; UNTSO; UNIFIL
- Awards: Military Medal for Gallantry with Distinction

Michael Lynch, MMG (24 April 1942 – 24 October 2008) was an Irish Army commandant, United Nations military observer, and a recipient of the Military Medal for Gallantry, the highest military decoration of Ireland.

== Early life ==
Lynch was born in Dublin on 24 April 1942, the son of Colonel Thomas Lynch. He was educated at Newbridge College in County Kildare and attended Trinity College, Dublin for a year before enlisting as a cadet at the Military College in the Curragh Camp. He was commissioned as an officer in 1962 and assigned to the 2nd Infantry Battalion.

== Military career ==
In 1965, Lynch began his overseas service with the Defence Forces as part of the United Nations Peacekeeping Force in Cyprus (UNFICYP). He served in the Sinai Peninsula in 1974, the desert between Egypt and Israel, as part of the UN force that supervised the ceasefire that saw the end of the Yom Kippur War.

In 1980, and already with significant overseas experience, Lynch began a tour of duty as a United Nations Military Observer in the Middle East. This tour took place against the backdrop of a civil war in Lebanon and in September 1982 Lynch was one of the first witnesses at the scene of the Sabra and Shatila massacre in Beirut.

Lynch is one of only six recipients of the Military Medal for Gallantry with Distinction, which was awarded after he recovered the bodies of UN colleagues who had driven into a minefield. Among the four UN observers killed was fellow Irish soldier, Commandant Michael Nestor from Newbridge. Lynch's citation reads:

For showing exemplary loyalty to his fallen United Nations Military Observers, and with disregard for his own safety, displaying the highest degree of courage and initiative in undertaking and successfully following through a difficult and dangerous mission, behind Syrian lines, in the mountains east of Beirut on the night of the 25th of September 1982, and for reflecting through his actions during the mission, outstanding credit on himself and his country.

Lynch took leave of the army in 1998, holding the rank of Camp Commandant, Clancy Barracks, Dublin.

== Personal and later life ==
Michael Lynch was married to Áine and the couple had a daughter and three sons.

He had a long rugby career, starting with school rugby at Newbridge College before going on to play as prop with North Kildare RFC, County Carlow Football Club and Lansdowne Football Club. He captained Monkstown Football Club to victory in the 1980 O'Connor Cup.

Upon retirement from the Defence Forces, Lynch ran the Orwell Lodge Hotel in Rathgar, Dublin for eight years before selling the hotel and establishing the El Comandante wine label in Mendoza, Argentina, in 2005.

Lynch became ill and died on 24 October 2008, aged 66.

== Decorations ==
| Military Medal for Gallantry (MMG) with Distinction |
| Service Medal (20 years service) |
| United Nations Peacekeepers Medal |
| United Nations Medal for UNFICYP |
| United Nations Medal for UNTSO |
| United Nations Medal for UNIFIL |
