= Michael Beary =

Irish Army major general (born 1956)

Major General Michael Beary DSM
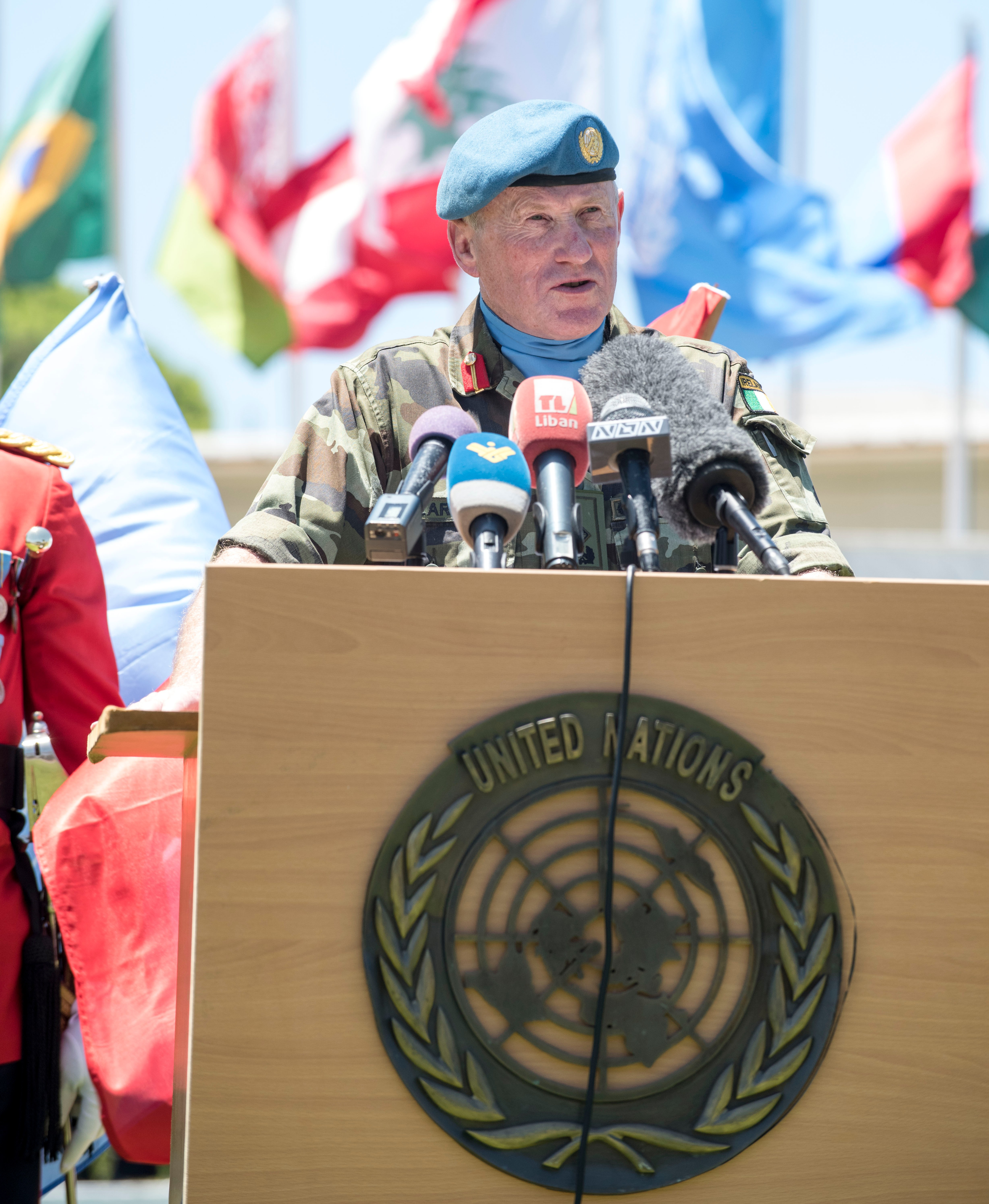
- Born: 1956 (age 69–70)
- Military career
- Allegiance: Ireland
- Branch: Army
- Service years: 1975–2018
- Rank: Major general
- Commands: Commander UNIFIL; Commander EUTM Somalia; GOC 2 Brigade; Director of Defence Forces Training; OC Eastern Brigade Training Centre
- Conflicts: UNIFIL (Lebanon); UNIKOM (Iraq-Kuwait); UNPROFOR (Bosnia and Herzegovina-Croatia); ISAF (Afghanistan); EUTM (Somalia/Uganda)
- Awards: Distinguished Service Medal (with Honour); Service Medal; UN Peacekeepers Medal; Centenary Medal; UN Medal for UNIFIL (3); UN Medal for UNIKOM; UN Medal for UNPROFOR (2); NATO Medal for the Balkans; NATO Medal for ISAF; CSDP Medal for EUTM Somalia; Commander of the National Order of the Cedar

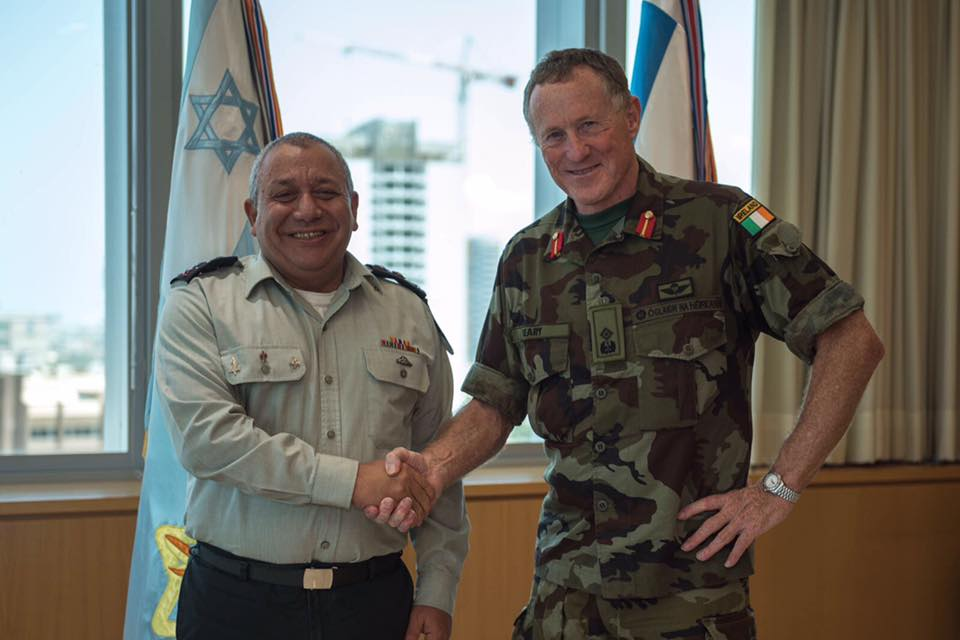
Michael Beary meeting with IDF Chief of General Staff, Gadi Eizenkot, July 2017

Michael Beary (born 1956) is a retired Irish Army major general and former head of mission and force commander of the United Nations Interim Force in Lebanon (UNIFIL). Beary is the current leader of the United Nations Mission to support the Hudaydah Agreement, having retired from the military.

== Military career ==
Beary was commissioned as an officer in the Irish Army Infantry Corps in 1975. Beary has held appointments as commanding officer of the Eastern Brigade Training Centre, in training, operations and Military Intelligence at Defence Forces Headquarters (DFHQ) and served as a Senior Instructor at the Command and Staff School, Military College, Defence Forces Training Centre (DFTC). In March 2009 Beary was promoted to the rank of colonel and appointed Director of Defence Forces Training with responsibility for education and training policy, the development of doctrine and liaison with external education and training agencies.

In November 2013 and upon promotion to the rank of brigadier general, Beary was appointed general officer commanding the 2nd Brigade (Army).

=== Overseas appointments ===
Beary has served on three deployments to Southern Lebanon (1982, 1989, 1994) with the United Nations Interim Force in Lebanon (UNIFIL) peacekeeping mission, including as company commander and staff officer in the Operations Branch at UNIFIL HQ.

He served in Kuwait and Baghdad, Iraq as part of the United Nations Iraq–Kuwait Observation Mission (UNIKOM).

He served in Bosnia and Herzegovina with the United Nations Protection Force (UNPROFOR).

In 2003, Beary completed a four-month tour of duty as Liaison Team Leader with the NATO-led International Security Assistance Force (ISAF) HQ in Afghanistan.

Between September 2004 and 2007, Beary served for three years with the European Union Military Staff (EUMS) Intelligence Division in Brussels while seconded to the General Secretariat of the Council of the European Union. Beary provided intelligence planning expertise in this role for EU military operations and civilian missions.

From August 2011 to February 2013, Beary commanded the European Union Training Mission Somalia (EUTM Somalia), an EU Common Security and Defence Policy (CSDP) mission to train Somali Armed Forces in Uganda.

On Friday, 27 May 2016, Secretary-General of the United Nations Ban Ki-moon appointed Major General Beary as the head of mission and force commander of the United Nations Interim Force in Lebanon, to succeed Major General Luciano Portolano of the Italian Army. Beary assumed command of UNIFIL on 19 July 2016.

In August 2017, the Trump administration Ambassador to the United Nations Nikki Haley accused Beary of being "blind" to a "massive flow of illegal weapons" to Hezbollah in Southern Lebanon. She said Beary displayed "an embarrassing lack of understanding of what's going on." Beary responded by saying "if there was a large cache of weapons, we would know about it" and that if anyone had information to the contrary, that they should provide it to the UN. Secretary-General of the United Nations António Guterres gave his full backing to Beary, as did the Irish government. The US or Israel did not provide any evidence to back up the claims.

== Civilian career ==
In 2021, Beary took up the role of Head of the UN Mission to Support the Hodeidah Agreement (UNMHA), a civil observer mission overseeing the ceasefire in Yemen.

In December 2022, Beary survived a landmine explosion which hit the armoured UN 4X4 he was travelling in while in Yemen as part of his UNMHA role. The UN team were travelling with members of the Houthi rebel group to oversee the decommissioning of explosives. A UN investigation was launched in order to determine whether the convoy was deliberately targeted.

== Education ==
Beary received his second-level education at Patrician College, Ballyfin, County Laois.

He has a Bachelor of Science (BSc) degree from NUI Galway and is a graduate of the Michael Smurfit Graduate Business School, University College Dublin (UCD) holding a Master of Business Studies in organisational studies.

He is a graduate of the Irish Defence Forces Command and Staff School, and a 2009 graduate of the National War College, National Defense University in Washington, D.C., from which he holds a Master of Science degree in National Security Studies.

== Decorations ==
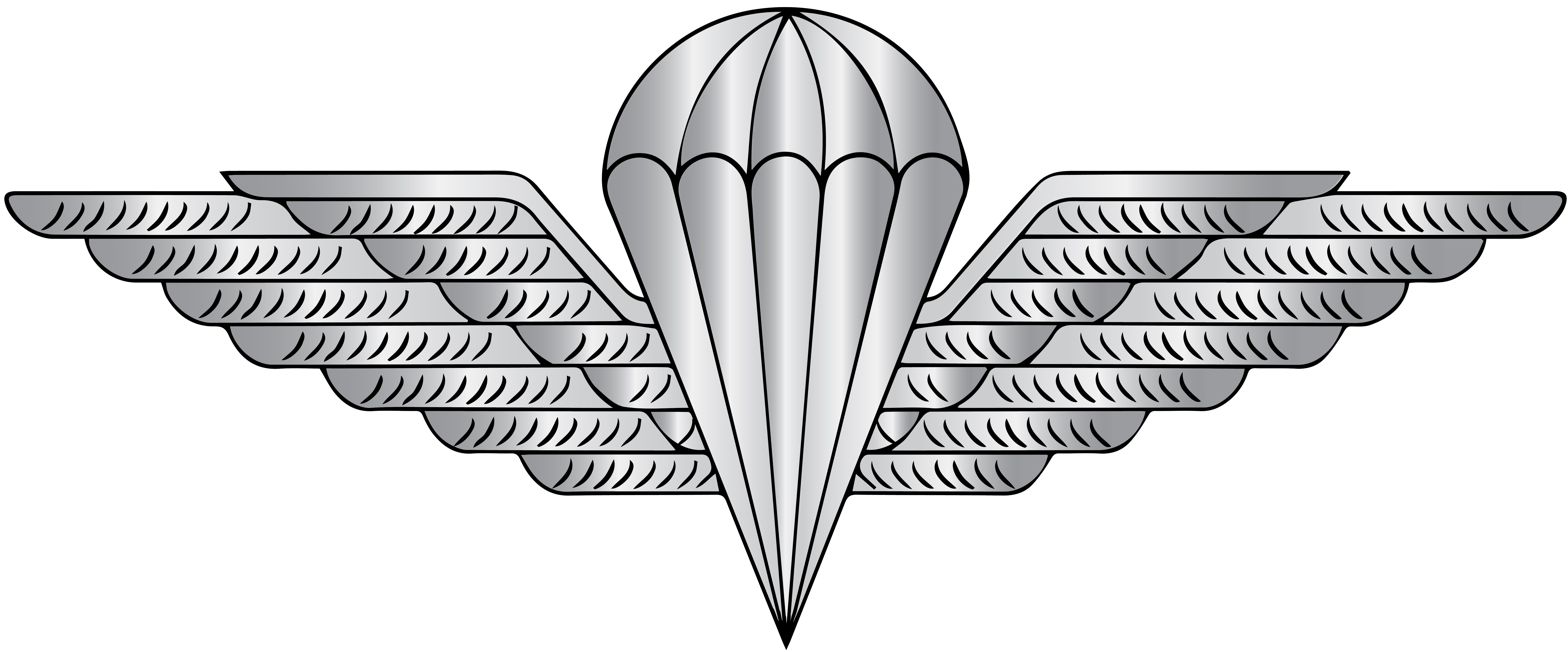
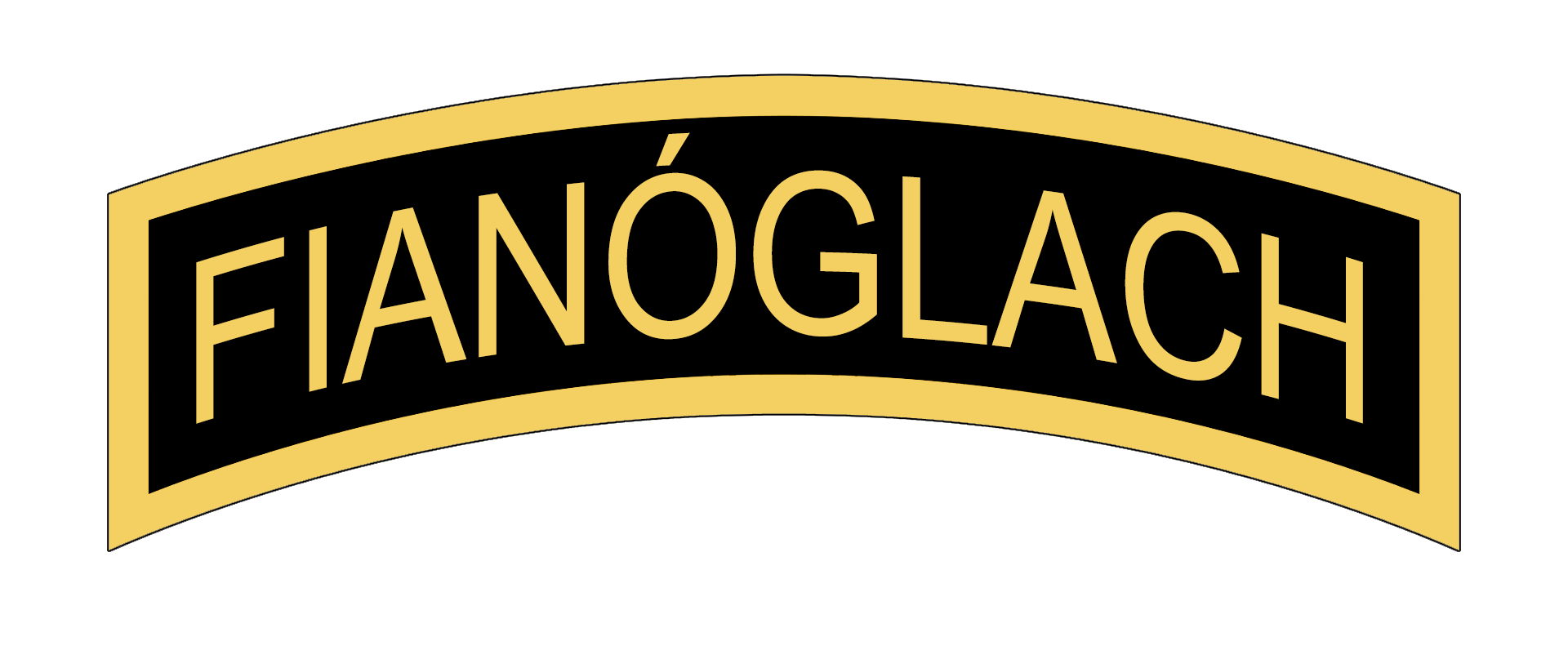
Distinguished Service Medal (with Honour)
Service Medal (20 years service)
United Nations Peacekeepers Medal
1916 Centenary Commemorative Medal
United Nations Medal for UNIFIL (3)
United Nations Medal for UNIKOM
United Nations Medal for UNPROFOR (2)
NATO Non-Article 5 Medal for the Balkans
NATO Non-Article 5 Medal for ISAF
Common Security and Defence Policy Service Medal for EUTM Somalia in Uganda
Lebanese National Order of the Cedar – Commander
"Wings" – Qualified Parachutist
Fianóglach gold shoulder tab (Successfully passed Army Ranger Wing selection)

Military offices
Preceded by Luciano Portolano	Commander of the United Nations Interim Force in Lebanon; 2016–2018	Succeeded by Stefano Del Col
