= Service star (disambiguation) =

Service star may refer to:

- service star, a U.S. military award, also known as a battle star or campaign star.
- Service Star (Congo), the "Service Star", a Belgian civil award for service in the Congo
- Distinguished Service Star, Philippine military award
- The Service Star (film), a 1918 U.S. silent film
- war hero, a star of the service

== See also ==
- Military Star, Irish military award
- General Campaign Star, Canadian military award
- Intelligence Star, U.S. CIA award for service to the CIA
- CIA Memorial Wall, memorial stars for agents who died in the duty of the service
- Star Air Service (1932-1944) U.S. airline
- Battlestar (disambiguation)
- bronze star
- Silver Star (disambiguation)
- Gold Star (disambiguation)
- Service (disambiguation)
- Star (disambiguation)
