= Abhijit Guha =

Abhijit Guha may refer to:

- Abhijit Guha (anthropologist), Indian anthropologist
- Abhijit Guha (director), Indian film director, actor and writer
- Abhijit Guha (general), Indian Army general
