= Standby High-Readiness Brigade =

- Standby High-Readiness Brigade logo
- Active: 1996 - June 30, 2009
- Allegiance: United Nations
- Role: International standby force for peacekeeping
- Size: 4,000-5,000
- Garrison/HQ: Høvelte
- Nickname: SHIRBRIG
- Mottos: Rapid, Flexible, Prepared

Commanders
- Notable commanders: Maj. Gen. Patrick Cammaert (The Netherlands); Brig. Gen. Sten Edholm (Sweden); Brig. Gen. Greg Mitchell (Canada)

The Standby High-Readiness Brigade (SHIRBRIG) was a Danish-led initiative associated with the United Nations that aimed to create a standby force ready for peacekeeping. It was formed largely as a result of the genocide in Rwanda and other atrocities. Its permanent headquarters were in Garderkasernen (Garder barracks), Høvelte 30 kilometres north of Copenhagen in Denmark. It was declared ready for operations on January 1, 2000, and deployed to the Horn of Africa in November 2000 to form the core of the UN Mission in Ethiopia and Eritrea (UNMEE) under the command of Royal Netherlands Marine Corps Major General Patrick Cammaert. The Brigade returned from that mission six months later and began a training cycle. It announced that it would again be ready for action as of January 1, 2002. Cammaert's appointment expired in November, 2002, but was extended at least once. Later commanders included Brig. Gen. Sten Edholm (Sweden), and Brig Gen Greg Mitchell (Canada).

The Brigade comprised a number of troops varying between four and five thousand, drawn from units pledged by eleven countries: Argentina, Austria, Canada, Denmark, Finland, Italy, the Netherlands, Norway, Poland, Romania, Spain and Sweden.

The nations that contributed to SHIRBRIG had the right to opt out of any operation. For example, when the UNMEE was formed, Argentina and Romania opted out for financial reasons.

The Brigade expected to operate independently at a considerable distance from support for up to 60 days. It stood ready for deployment from point of embarkation at 15 to 30 days' notice. Its deployment will be limited to six months duration, after which the mission will either be terminated or other forces will replace the Brigade.

Other operations the Brigade took part in were planning ECOWAS's operation in Côte d'Ivoire, and forming the Interim Headquarters of the United Nations Mission in Liberia.

The Brigade ceased all operational activities on June 30, 2009, and closed down the organization. The Brigade's files were given to the U.S. Army's Peacekeeping & Stability Operations Institute (PKSOI) at Carlisle Barracks, PA and are located at the adjacent Army Heritage Education Center in Carlisle, Pennsylvania, USA.
