= Warstar =

Warstar may refer to:

- War hero or war star
- Warstar (comics), two aliens that serve as a member of the Shi'ar Imperial Guard (Marvel Comics)
- Universal Annihilation Army Warstar or "Warstar" (Japanese: 宇宙虐滅軍団ウォースター, Uchū Gyakumetsu Gundan Wōsutā), the antagonists from Tensou Sentai Goseiger
- The Warstar Empire, an organization appearing in the TV series Power Rangers Megaforce
- Warstar (GY73), a trawler built in 1914 by Cook, Welton & Gemmell

== See also ==
- Military Star, Irish decoration
- Battlestar (disambiguation)
- Star Wars (disambiguation)
- Star (disambiguation)
- War (disambiguation)
