= 1916 Centenary Commemorative Medal =

Irish Defence Forces award

1916 Centenary Commemorative Medal Irish: Bonn Comórtha Céad Bliain
- 1916 Centenary Commemorative Medal (ribbon)
- Type: Wearable
- Awarded for: Awarded to Defence Forces personnel in recognition of the role they played to commemorate 100 years since the 1916 Easter Rising
- Presented by: Ireland
- Eligibility: Officers & Other Ranks of the Defence Forces and members of the Army Nursing and Chaplaincy Services.
- Established: December 2016

Highlights
- Total: ~ 13,000

Precedence
- Next (higher): United Nations Peacekeepers Medal/International Operational Service Medal
- Next (lower): UN, NATO or EU medal

The 1916 Centenary Commemorative Medal (Irish: Bonn Comórtha Céad Bliain) is a military decoration awarded by the Government of Ireland to personnel of the Irish Defence Forces who served in 2016 to honour the legacy of continued service by the military to the state since its foundation and in recognition for the role they played to commemorate 100 years since the 1916 Easter Rising.

== Background ==
The Centenary Commemorative Medal was awarded to all Permanent and Reserve personnel of the Defence Forces in December 2016 in acknowledgement for the ceremonial role played by Óglaigh na hÉireann across all aspects of the centenary commemorations programme. The medal is based on the 1916 Medal which was awarded to those who rendered recognised military service during the week of 23 April 1916.

The project to deliver a National Flag to all primary schools in the Republic of Ireland was conducted between September 2015 and March 2016 and involved 10,000 Defence Forces personnel visiting 3,200 schools and presenting them with a handmade National Flag and a copy of the Proclamation of the Irish Republic.

The Easter Rising centenary parade at the General Post Office, Dublin (GPO) included 2,800 members of the Defence Forces and a display of military equipment, vehicles and aircraft watched by over 750,000 people lining the streets of Dublin. Also as part of the 2016 State Centenary Programme, the Defence Forces raised the National Flag on O'Connell Street every day in 2016.

13 parades were held to award the 1916 Centenary Commemorative Medal to all members of the Defence Forces. The first medals were presented by President of Ireland, Michael D. Higgins and members of the government at a state ceremony in Dublin Castle on 4 December 2016, as part of the Centenary programme. This was followed by 12 regional events at selected military installations nationwide presided over by Minister Paul Kehoe.

=== Design ===
The medal is a dark bronze alloy 35 mm in diameter, fashioned (after the manner of the official Defence Forces crest) in the form of a circle of flame representing the sunburst on which eight points of a star are superimposed. The letters 'I' and 'V' are embossed on the left and right of centre of the sunburst, denoting Irish Volunteer. On the reserve side shall be inscribed the dates '1916–2016' with seven diamonds, representing the seven signatories of the Proclamation of the Irish Republic.

=== Ribbon ===
The ribbon is 5 cm in length and is 31 mm wide with 1 x 14 mm wide green stripe, 1 x 3 mm white stripe and 1 x 14 mm orange stripe.

=== Suspension ===
The ribbon hangs from a bronze alloy pin-back brooch in which bears a Celtic interlace design.

=== Service bar ===
The bar which is joined to the suspender bears the inscription Cuimhnig Ar 1916 which is translated 'Remember 1916' with a St Brendan's Knot at either side.

=== Eligibility ===
The Minister may award the medal to members of the Permanent Defence Forces, members of the Reserve Defence Forces, members of the Army Nursing Service and members of the Chaplaincy Service who are in service at any time during the period 1 January 2016 and 31 December 2016 inclusive. Members of the Defence Forces, Army Nursing Service and Chaplaincy Service who die in service in the year 2016 will be eligible for the award of the medal.

=== Posthumous awards ===
A posthumous award may be awarded to one member of the family of the deceased person.

=== Order of precedence ===
The 1916 Centenary Commemorative Medal will be worn in order of precedence after the United Nations Peacekeepers Medal and the International Operational Service Medal (if applicable) and before any UN, NATO/PfP or EU medal.

== See also ==
- Centenary of the Easter Rising
- Easter Rising centenary parade
