= Wang Xiaojun (born 1959) =

Chinese military officer and diplomat

Major General Wang Xiaojun is a Chinese military officer and diplomat who served as the Force Commander of the United Nations Mission for Referendum in Western Sahara. Prior to this appointment of 8 December 2016 by United Nations Secretary-General Ban Ki-moon, Major General Wang Xiaojun served as the Defence Attaché at several embassies of the People's Republic of China including to Brazil, India, Sweden and the United States.

== Biographical Information ==
From 2003 to 2004, Major General Wang Xiaojun served at the United Nations Mission for the Referendum in Western Sahara (MINURSO). From 1992 to 1993 he was a United Nations Military Observer in Kuwait. He holds a master's degree from the Military Science Institution of the People's Liberation Army and a bachelor's degree in signals technology and command from the Nanjing Army Command College in China.
