= Galactica =

Galactica may refer to:

- Galactica (moth), a moth genus
- Battlestar Galactica, a fictional spacecraft and an American science fiction franchise
- Imperium Galactica, a computer game
- Galactica (roller coaster), at Alton Towers in Staffordshire, England
- Galactica, a large language model for generating scientific text published by Meta AI.

== See also ==
- Galaxia (disambiguation)
- Galaxy (disambiguation)
