= Military Medal for Gallantry =

Military Medal For Gallantry An Bonn Míleata Calmachta
- Military Medal For Gallantry with Honour Military Medal For Gallantry with Distinction Military Medal For Gallantry with Merit
- Awarded for: Acts of exceptional bravery or gallantry during military service with risk to life and personal safety.
- Presented by: Ireland
- Eligibility: Officers, Non-Commissioned Officers and privates/seaman/aircrew of the Defence Forces and members of the Army Nursing and Chaplaincy Services.
- Post-nominals: BMC
- Status: Currently awarded
- Established: 1944

Highlights
- Total recipients: 8

Precedence
- Next (higher): None
- Next (lower): Distinguished Service Medal

The Military Medal For Gallantry (MMG) (Irish: An Bonn Míleata Calmachta or BMC) is a military decoration awarded by the Government of Ireland. The medal has been awarded in three grades since its inception in 1944 and, as of 2025, has a total of eight recipients.

Those awarded the medal are entitled to use of the post-nomimals "BMC", the Irish abbreviation of the medal's name.

Presented for acts of exceptional bravery or gallantry by a member of the Irish Defence Forces, the Military Medal for Gallantry is the highest military honour presented by the Republic of Ireland.

== History ==
The Military Medal for Gallantry was created in 1944 amidst the ongoing Emergency in Europe, to be awarded in three grades: 1st Class, 2nd Class, 3rd Class.

In January 1984, the three distinct grades of the medal were renamed: 1st Class became with Honour, 2nd with Distinction, and 3rd with Merit. Since the medal's inception it has been awarded six times with Distinction and twice with Merit. It has never yet been awarded with Honour.

== Criteria ==
The Military Medal for Gallantry is awarded for "any act of exceptional bravery or gallantry (other than one performed on war service) arising out of, or associated with, military service and involving risk to life and limb." The medal can be awarded to officers, non-commissioned officers, or privates/seaman/aircrew of the Defence Forces and to members of the Army Nursing Service and Chaplaincy Services.

== Appearance ==
The medal is made of silver when awarded with Honour and is bronze when awarded with Distinction and Merit. The obverse of the medal depicts a cross with St. Brendan's knot on each arm. Superimposed on the cross is a laurel wreath. In the centre are the Irish words DE ḂARR CALMAĊTA (in standard orthography De bharr Calmachta, 'For Gallantry'). The reverse is plain except for the inscription An Bonn Míleata Calmaċta arching over a scroll on which to inscribes the recipient's name. The maker's hallmark is located at the bottom.

The medal hangs from a straight arm suspension attached to a 35-millimetre (1.4 in) ribbon which is green and crimson. The ribbon for the medal with Honour is green with a 3-millimetre (0.12 in) central stripe of crimson, while the medal with Distinction is green with 6-millimetre (0.24 in) stripes of crimson at the edges, and the medal with Merit is green with 3-millimetre crimson edges and a 3-millimetre crimson central stripe.

Subsequent awards of the medal are denoted by a 7-millimetre (0.28 in) metal disc bearing a Celtic triquetra design.

== Recipients ==
There have been eight recipients of the Military Medal for Gallantry, of whom six have received it with Distinction (2nd class) and 2 with Merit (3rd class). Six of the recipients were serving with the United Nations Interim Force in Lebanon (UNIFIL), with several of the medals awarded for actions during the Battle of At Tiri.

Rank	Name	Mission	Class	Citation
Trooper	Anthony Browne	ONUC	Distinction	"He endeavoured to create an opportunity to allow an injured comrade to escape by firing his Gustaf thereby drawing attention to his own position which he must have been aware would endanger his life. He had a reasonable opportunity to escape because he was not wounded but chose to remain with an injured comrade."
Captain	Adrian Ainsworth	UNIFIL	Distinction	"For displaying exceptional bravery and compassion of a high order when at At-Tiri, South Lebanon on the 7th of April 1980, at grave danger to his own life from direct and sustained hostile fire, he without hesitation crawled a distance of two hundred metres to aid a grievously wounded comrade, and still under fire on the return journey, brought him to a place of safety."
Lieutenant	Anthony Bracken	UNIFIL	Distinction	"For displaying outstanding initiative and exceptional bravery, under heavy fire on the 8th of April 1980, at the village of At-Tiri, South Lebanon, he, voluntarily leaving his position, regardless for the safety of his own life, went to the aid of two injured comrades, and whilst still under heavy sustained fire, assisted them over a distance of two hundred metres to safety."
Corporal	Michael Jones	UNIFIL	Distinction	"For displaying outstanding initiative and exceptional bravery, under heavy fire on the 8th of April 1980, at the village of At-Tiri, South Lebanon, he, voluntarily leaving his position, regardless for the safety of his own life, went to the aid of two injured comrades, and whilst still under heavy sustained fire, assisted them over a distance of two hundred metres to safety."
Private	Michael John Daly	UNIFIL	Distinction	"For displaying exceptional bravery and compassion of a high order when at At-Tiri, South Lebanon on the 7th of April 1980, at grave danger to his own life from direct and sustained hostile fire, he without hesitation crawled a distance of two hundred metres to aid a grievously wounded comrade, and still under fire on the return journey, brought him to a place of safety."
Commandant	Michael Lynch	UNIFIL	Distinction	"For showing exemplary loyalty to his fallen United Nations Military Observers, and with disregard for his own safety, displaying the highest degree of courage and initiative in undertaking and successfully following through a difficult and dangerous mission, behind Syrian lines, in the mountains east of Beirut on the night of the 25th of September 1982, and for reflecting through his actions during the mission, outstanding credit on himself and his country."
Private	Paul Coventry	UNIFIL	Merit	"For displaying exceptional bravery and compassion of a higher order, while serving with the United Nations Interim Force In Lebanon, when during a serious confrontation with armed elements at Checkpoint 6-10 Al Jurn, on the 29th of September 1992, he, with little regard for his own safety, voluntarily and without hesitation, left his position of relative safety and moved, exposing himself to hostile fire, to a position that was under effective fire, to render assistance to a wounded comrade."
Private	Thomas Metcalfe	Portlaoise Prison	Merit	"For an act of exceptional bravery and with little regard for his own safety, on the 25th of July 1981, in Portlaoise Prison during an outbreak of fire, he voluntarily scaled a forty foot high drainpipe in darkness, and succeeded in rescuing a comrade soldier trapped on a blazing rooftop."
