= UN observer =

UN observer might refer to

- United Nations General Assembly observers, entities with limited participation in the UN General Assembly
- United Nations Military Observer, troops of the UN Security Council
