= United Nations Mission to support the Hudaydah Agreement =

Civil observer mission in Yemen

- Formation: 16th January, 2019
- Dissolved: 31st March, 2026
- Type: Special political mission
- Legal status: Completed
- Head: Michael Beary

The United Nations Mission to support the Hudaydah Agreement (Arabic: بعثة الأمم المتحدة لدعم اتفاق الحُديدة, romanized: Baʿthat al-Umam al-Muttaḥida li-Daʿm Ittifāq al-Ḥudayda; UNMHA, أونمها) was a civil observer mission initiated by the United Nations in Yemen. On 22 December 2018, retired Dutch General Patrick Cammaert began leading the mission. The mission consisted of civic authorities personnel, military personnel, and police. The headquarters of the UNMHA was at Al-Hudaydah, located on the west coast of Yemen. The UNMHA mandate was between the Yemeni government and the Houthis. On 17 January 2019, Cammaert's convoy was reported to have been fired upon by unknown assailants, though Cammaert remained uninjured. On 31 January 2019, he was replaced by Danish Major General Michael Lollesgaard. Retired Major General Michael Beary, from Ireland, was the last leader of the UNMHA mission.

== Heads ==
Number	Name	Position	Nationality	Term start	Term end
1	Patrick Cammaert	head	Netherlands	2018	2019
1	Daniela Kroslak	Deputy head	Germany	2018	2019
2	Michael Lollesgaard	Head	Denmark	2019	2019
3	Abhijit Guha	Head	India	2019	2021
2	Vivian van de Perre	Deputy head	Netherlands	2019	2024
4	Michael Beary	Head	Ireland	2021	2026
3	Mari Yamashita	Deputy head	Japan	2024	2026
