= Good Conduct Medal (Ireland) =

Good Conduct Medal An Bonn Dea-Iompair
- Type: Military decoration
- Awarded for: Meritorious service characterised by exemplary conduct
- Presented by: Ireland
- Eligibility: Non-commissioned officers and Privates/Seaman/Aircrew of the Defence Forces
- Post-nominals: BDI
- Status: Discontinued
- First award: 1989
- Final award: 1990

Highlights
- Total: 120
- Good Conduct Medal ribbon

Precedence
- Next (higher): Distinguished Service Medal
- Next (lower): Service Medal

The Good Conduct Medal (Irish: An Bonn Dea-Iompair) is a military decoration awarded by the Irish Government to members of the Defence Forces of Ireland. It was instituted on 16 September 1987 as an award for enlisted personnel with at least 10 years' continuous service who had shown exemplary conduct.

== Appearance ==
The medal is made of bronze. Except for the text, the pattern is identical to that of the older Service Medal. The obverse of the medal depicts the figure of Éire (a personification of Ireland) placing a laurel wreath on a kneeling soldier's head. To the left are the words AN BONN DEA-IOMPAIR in Irish, and to the right there is a spray of laurel. On the reverse the words THE GOOD CONDUCT MEDAL are found in raised relief, with the particulars of the recipient engraved in the centre.

The medal hangs from a ring attached to a 35 millimetres (1.4 in) ribbon. The pattern of the ribbon is distinctive; it is orange, with 5 millimetres (0.20 in) green stripes sloping from the wearer's right to left at an angle of 45°.

== Criteria ==
The medal could be awarded to any eligible non-commissioned officer or private who was deemed to have carried out meritorious service with good conduct. The medals were presented by the General Officer Commanding at a special annual parade; 60 medals were awarded each year. The medals could be forfeit in the case of misconduct, conviction by a civil court, conviction in the special criminal court, discharge with ignominy, or a sentence resulting in discharge from the Defence Forces.

Only 120 Good Conduct Medals were ever issued, 60 in 1989 and 60 in 1990. The award was suspended after 1990 owing to controversy over the criteria for eligibility.
