= Battlestar =

Battlestar and similar may refer to:

- Battle star, an award issued to U.S. Navy ships for participation in battles.
- Battlestar (character), a superhero in the Marvel Comics universe
- Battlestars (game show), an American game show that aired on two separate runs on NBC during the early 1980s
- "Battlestar", a song by Five off their 1999 album Invincible
- Battlestar (Battlestar Galactica), a fictional class of warships in the sci-fi series Battlestar Galactica

== See also ==
- Battle of the Stars (Italian: Cosmo 2000 - Battaglie negli spazi stellari), a 1978 Italian fusilli sci-fi space opera film directed by Alfonso Brescia
- Battlestar Galactica (disambiguation) for uses of Battlestar in science fiction and video games
- Military Star, Irish decoration
- Warstar (disambiguation)
- Battle (disambiguation)
- Star (disambiguation)
