= Service Medal (Republic of Ireland) =

Service Medal An Bonn Seirbhíse
- 10 Years Service Medal Ribbon. 15 Years Service Medal Ribbon
- Type: Military long service medal
- Awarded for: 10, 15 or 20 Years Service.
- Presented by: Ireland
- Eligibility: Commissioned officers, non-commissioned officers (NCOs) and Privates/Seaman/Aircrew of the Defence Forces
- Status: Currently awarded
- First award: December 1944

Precedence
- Next (higher): Good Conduct Medal
- Next (lower): Service Medal FCÁ and SM

The Service Medal (Irish: An Bonn Seirbhíse) is a military decoration of the Republic of Ireland, it is awarded to members of the permanent Defence Forces for 10 years or more of service.

The service medal was instituted on 13 December 1944 by the Irish government. The design has remained the same since.

== Eligibility ==
The 10 year service medal is awarded to all Privates and NCOs for 10 years service.

The 15 Year Service Medal is awarded for completion of a further 5 years service, the ribbon colour is changed to include a gold stripe and a bar is added to the ribbon. Commissioned Officers are awarded this as well, and they receive a bar after 20 years service.

== See also ==
Military awards and decorations of Ireland
