= Easter Rising centenary parade =

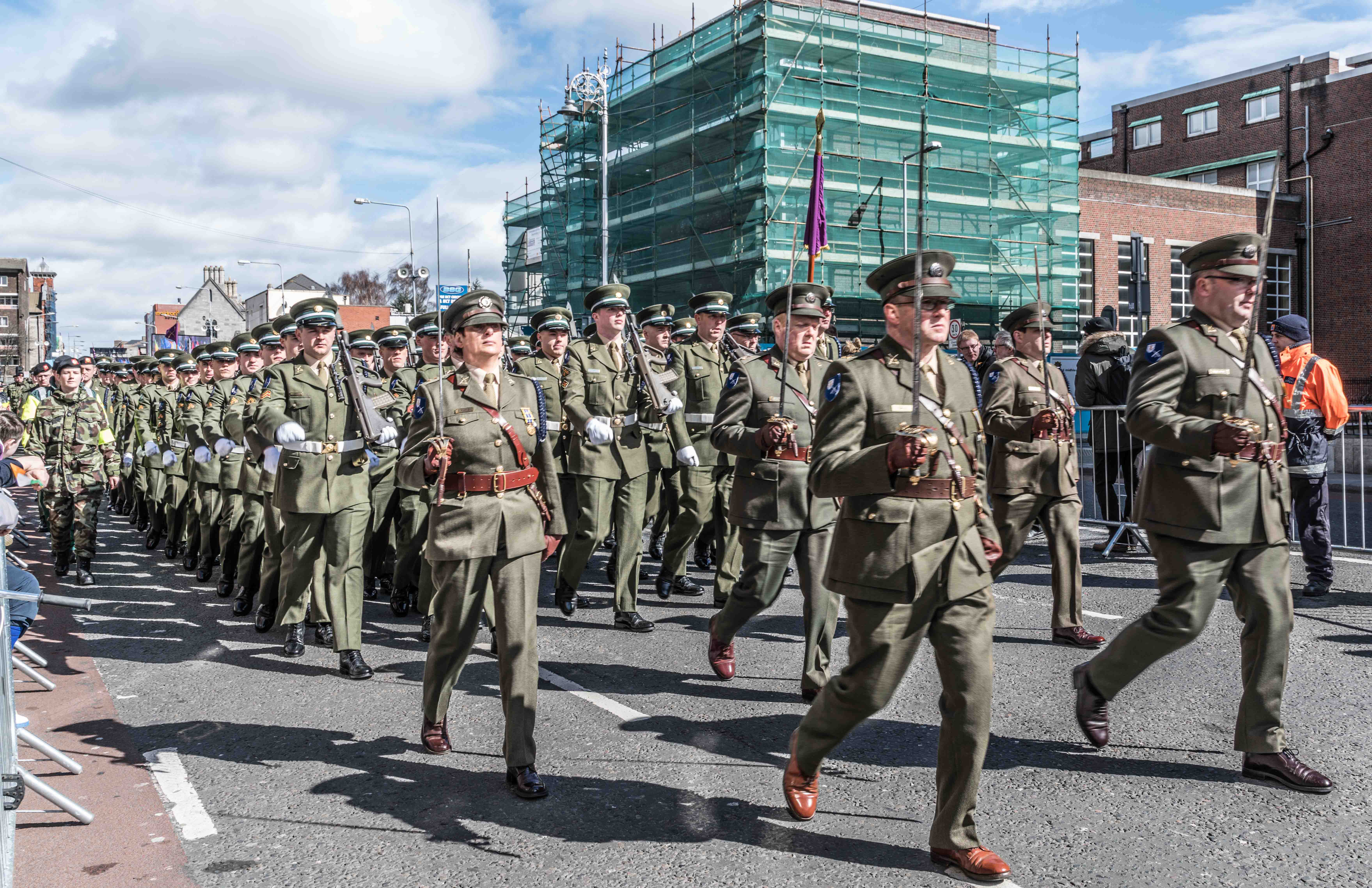
- Members of the Irish Army march past
- Date: 27 March 2016
- Location: Dublin
- Type: Parade

The Easter Rising centenary parade took place in Dublin city on Easter Sunday, 27 March 2016 to commemorate the centenary of the Easter Rising. It involved all branches of the Defence Forces, including the Army, Air Corps, Naval Service and Reserve Defence Forces, as well as the Garda Síochána, Dublin Fire Brigade, the HSE National Ambulance Service, the Irish Coast Guard, the Irish Prison Service and Customs, the Red Cross, the RNLI, Civil Defence Ireland and St John Ambulance Ireland. The parade was one of the largest of its kind ever held in the state, involving over 3,700 military personnel, 78 vehicles and 17 aircraft. The events were broadcast on RTÉ television and it is estimated that around 1 million people viewed the parade across the streets of Dublin. The parade commenced at 10.30 a.m. from St. Stephen's Green and made its way along Dublin before stopping at O'Connell Bridge for the main Easter Sunday Commemoration at the GPO. Following the ceremony, the troops marched past the GPO in O'Connell Street before finishing at Bolton Street around 3 p.m.

== Ceremony ==
The Easter Rising ceremony was attended by the President of Ireland Michael D Higgins, his wife Sabina Higgins, Taoiseach Enda Kenny, Tánaiste Joan Burton, the Fianna Fáil leader Micheál Martin, the Ceann Comhairle Seán Ó Fearghaíl, the Lord Mayor of Dublin Críona Ní Dhálaigh, the Deputy First Minister of Northern Ireland Martin McGuinness, Former Presidents Mary Robinson and Mary McAleese and Former Taoisigh Liam Cosgrave, John Bruton, Bertie Ahern and Brian Cowen. Other members of the government were also present at the commemoration, as well as a range of religious leaders and military officers. Ahead of the ceremony, the President inspected a guard of honour from the 27th Infantry Battalion from Finner Camp in County Donegal. The centenary commemoration began at 12 p.m. with the lowering of the Flag of Ireland before a short prayer service was held. This was followed by a piper's lament as children from the four provinces of Ulster, Leinster, Munster and Connacht lay daffodils around the pillars of the GPO. The Band of the Army No.1 Brigade then played Danny Boy before the Proclamation of the Irish Republic was read out by a soldier from the Irish Army. After the band played Seán Ó Riada's Mise Éire, the President laid a wreath in front of the GPO in memory of those who were killed during the Rising in April 1916. A minute's silence was observed before the sounding of the Last Post. After the Irish flag was raised on top of the GPO, the Army No.1 Band played the national anthem, Amhrán na bhFiann while a flypast of 6 Pilatus PC-9 aircraft from the Irish Air Corps flew across the GPO to conclude the commemoration ceremony.

== Full order of the 2016 Easter Rising centenary parade ==
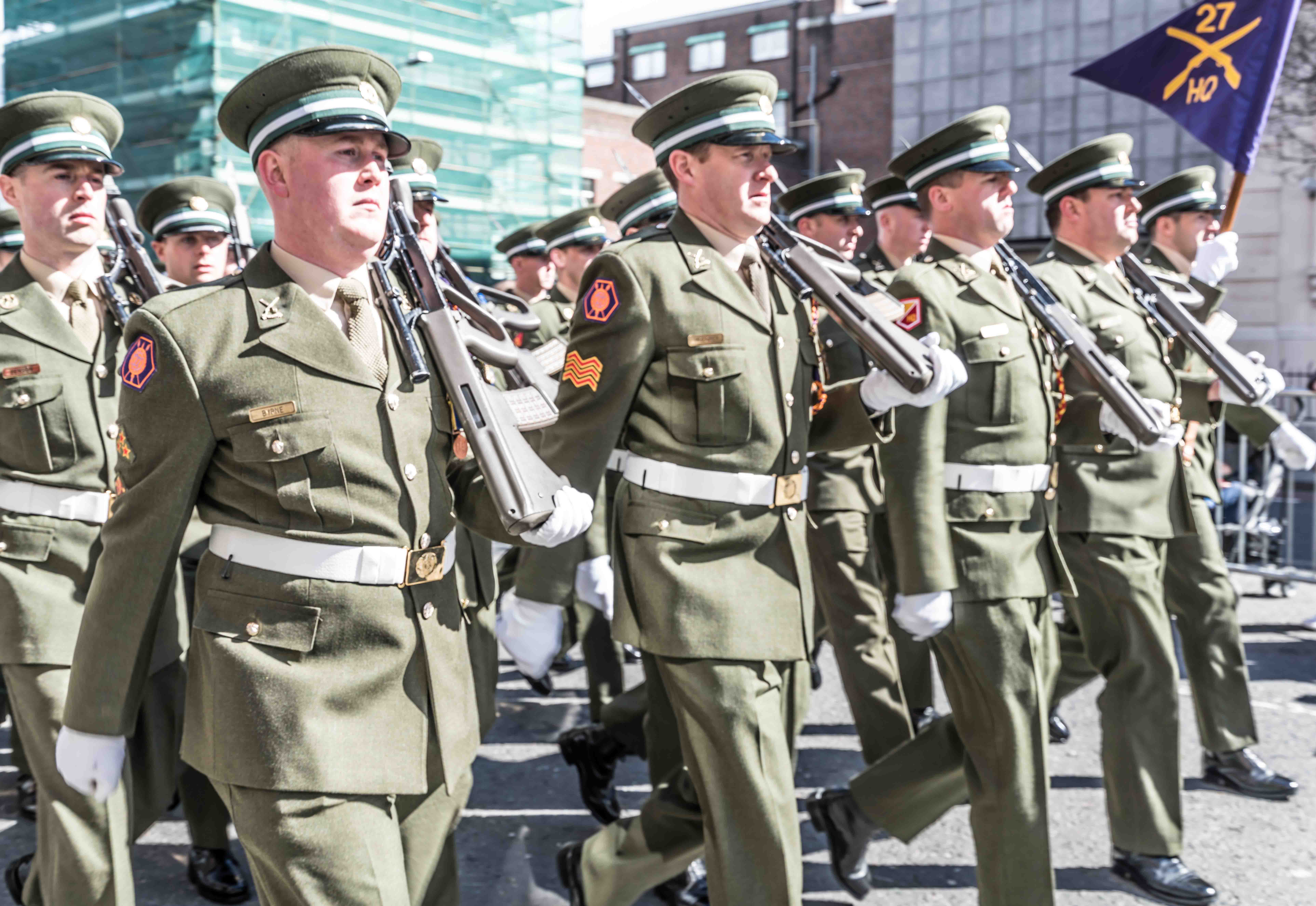
Personnel of the Irish Army carrying Steyr AUG assault rifles

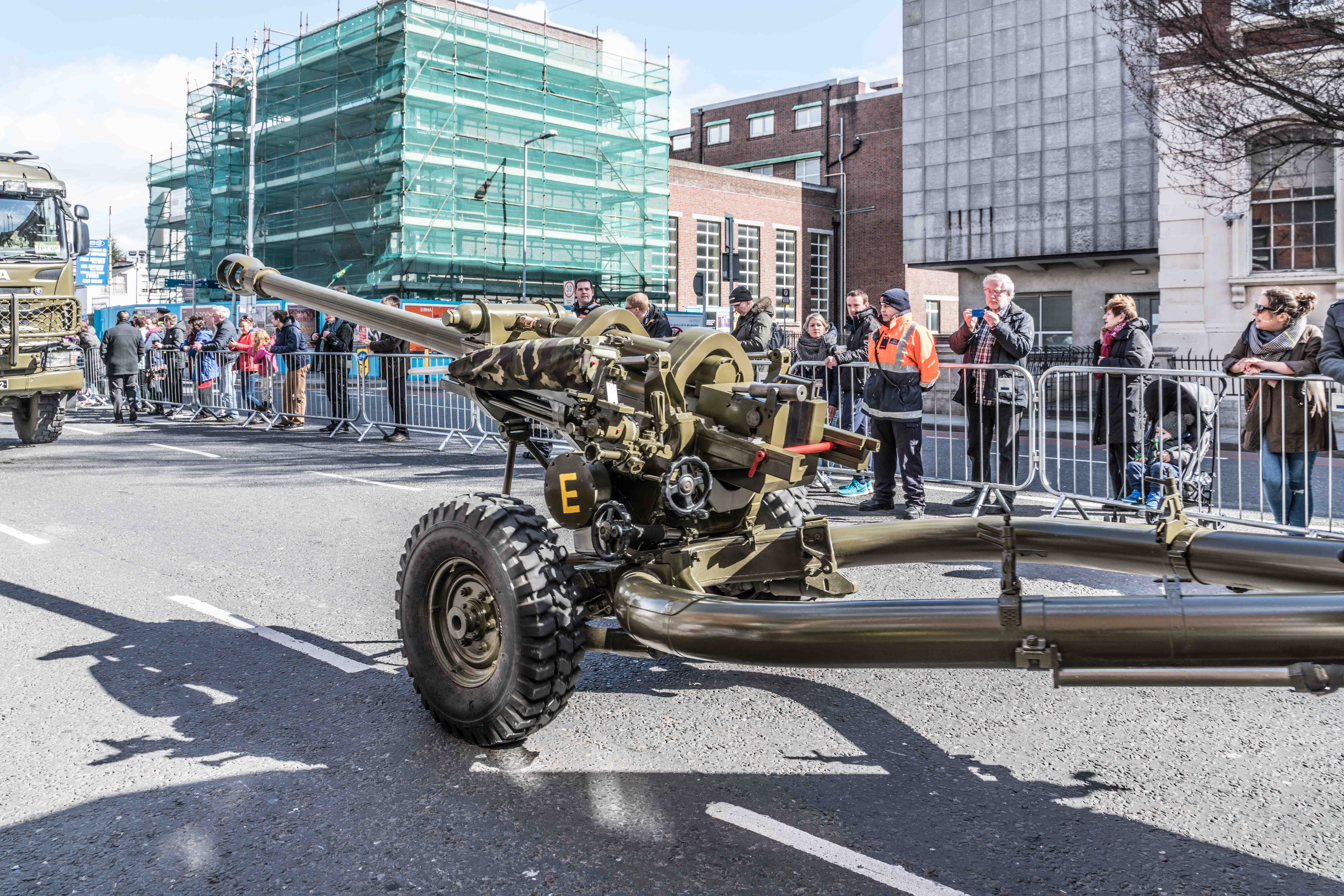
105 mm L119 light gun

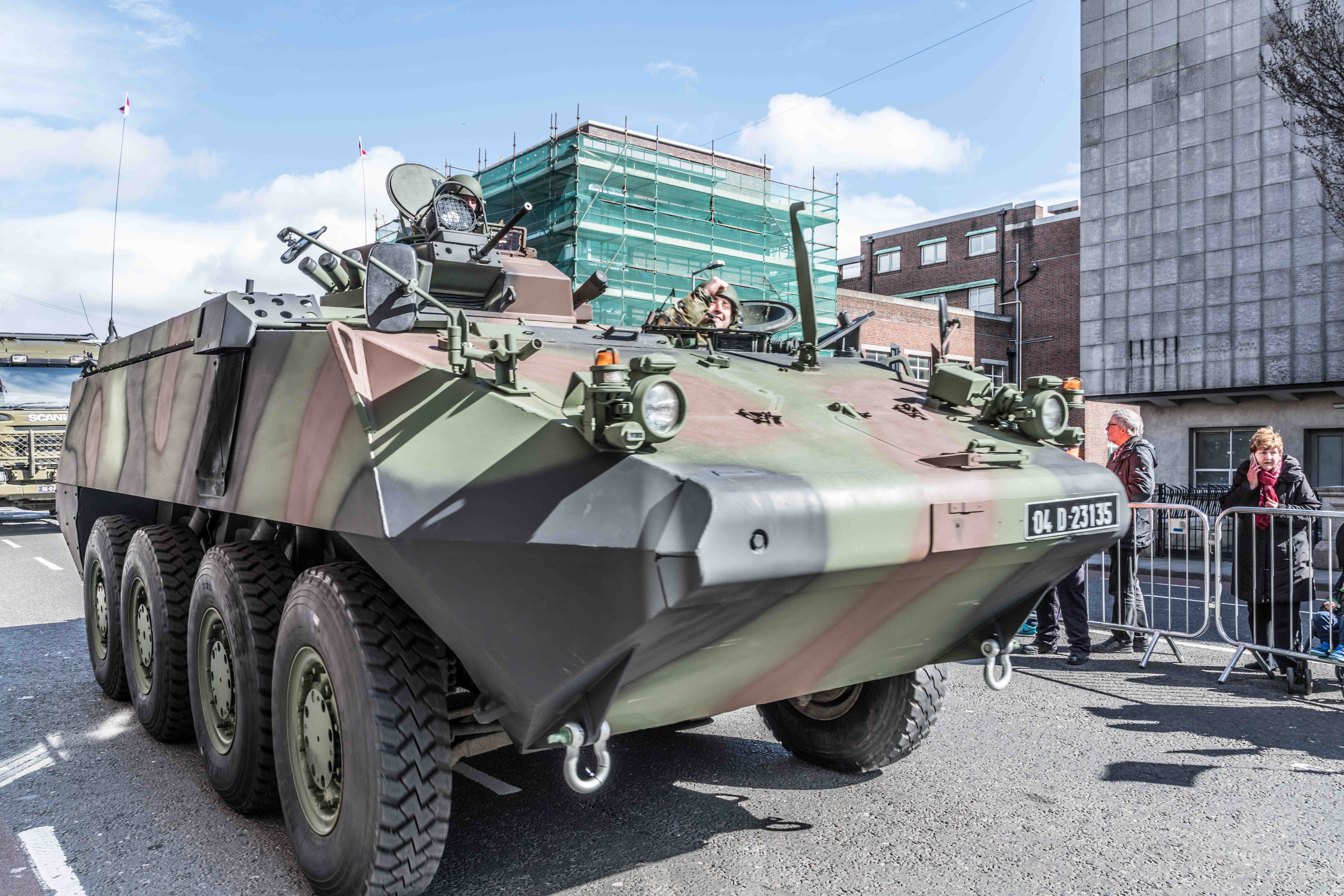
Mowag Piranha IIIH

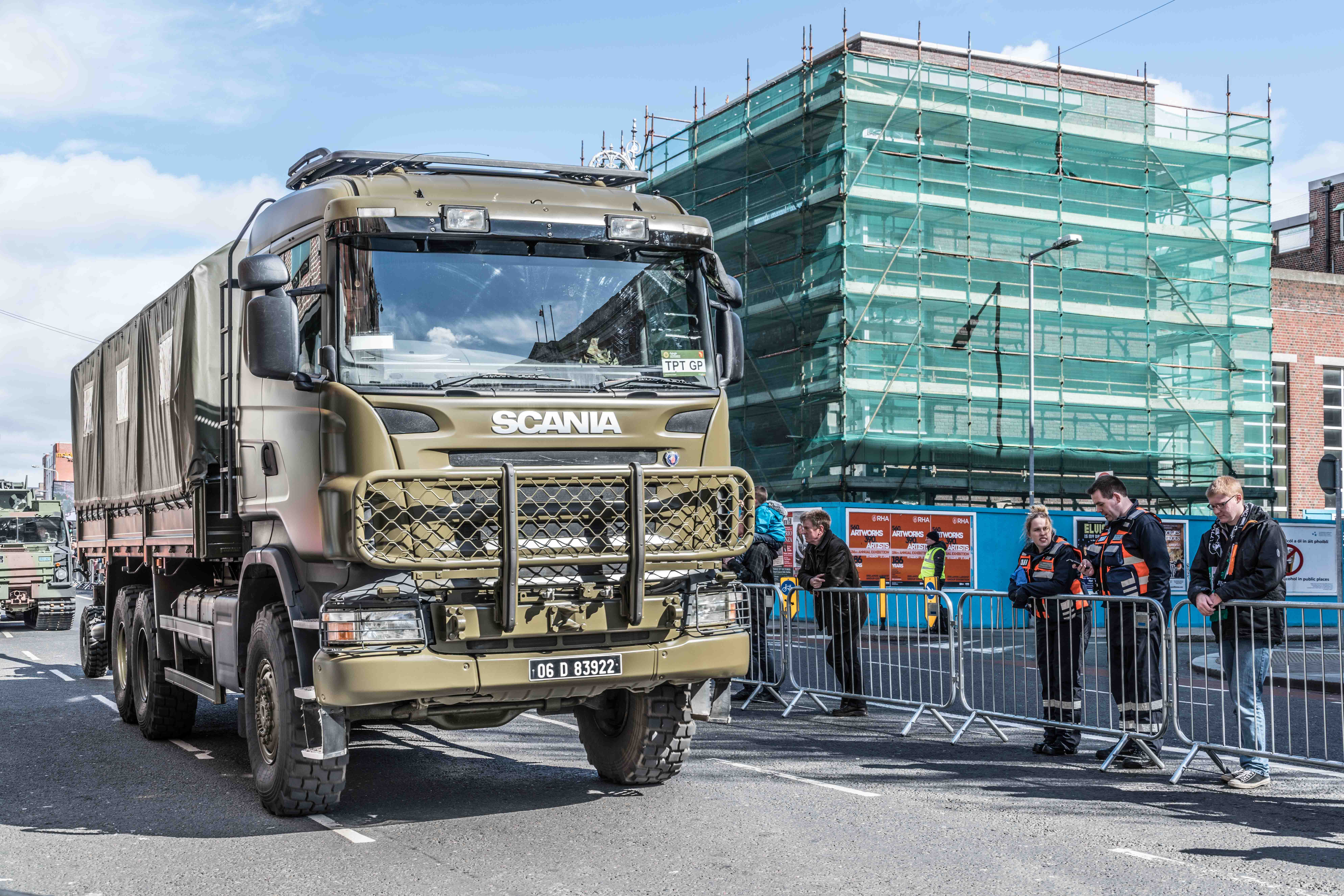
Scania R 420 6x6

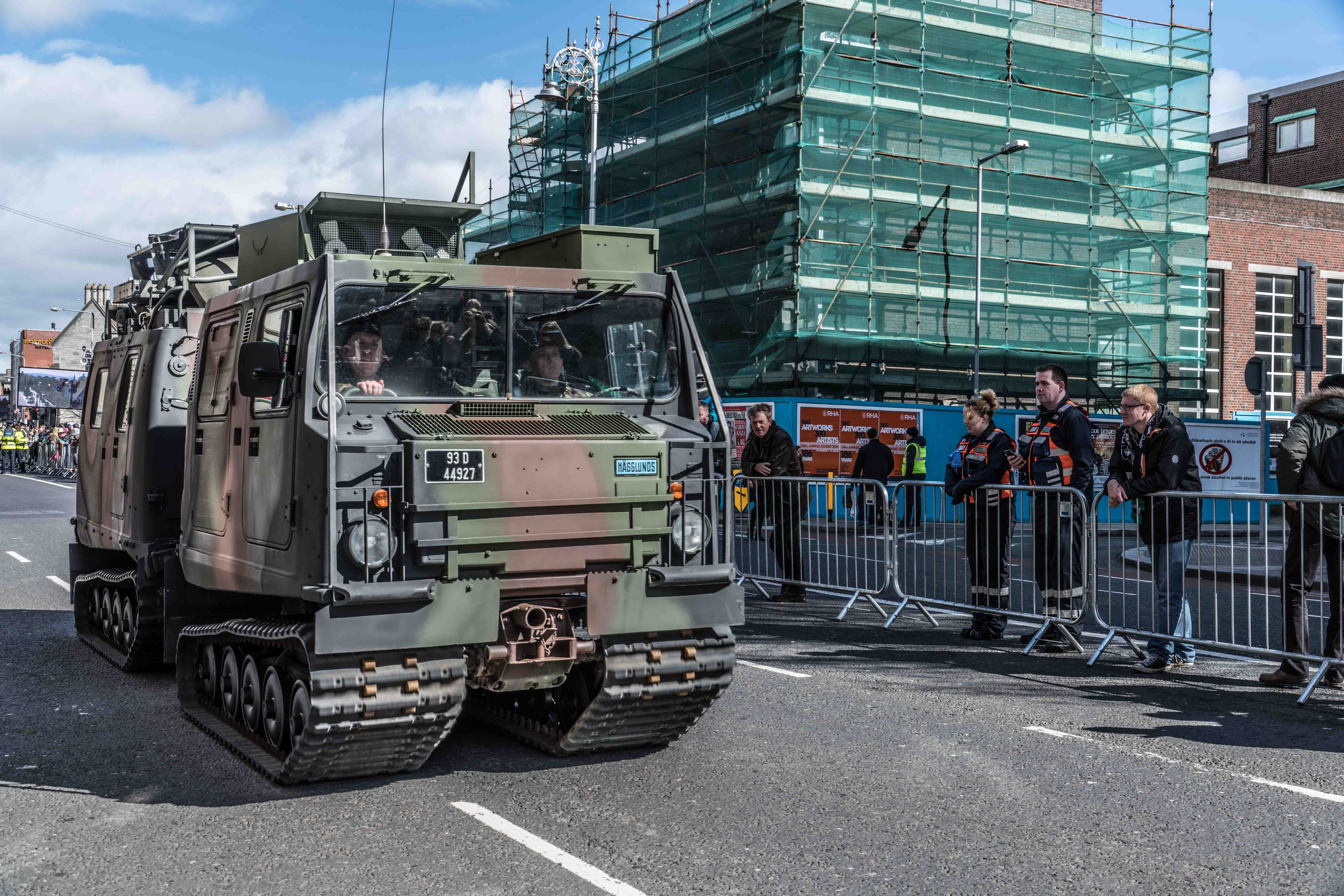
Bandvagn 206

=== Bands ===
- Irish Defence Forces School of Music
  - The Army No.1 Band
  - The Band of the (2nd) Southern Brigade
  - The Band of the (4th) Western Brigade
  - The Pipe Band of the Defence Forces
- The Garda Band
- The Dublin Fire Brigade Pipe Band
- The Irish Prison Service Pipe Band
- The Irish Ambulance Service Pipe Band

=== Weapons ===
- Steyr AUG - assault rifle
- FN MAG - 7.62 mm machine gun
- M2 Browning - 12.7 mm machine gun
- L118 light gun - 105 mm towed howitzer
- L119 light gun - 105 mm towed howitzer

=== Vehicles ===
==== Active ====
- Mowag Piranha IIIH - armoured personnel carrier
- RG-32M Light Tactical Vehicle (LTV) - MRAP armoured personnel carrier
- FV101 Scorpion - reconnaissance vehicle/light tank
- Ford F350 SRV - reconnaissance vehicle
- Scania R 420 6x6 - troop carrying vehicle
- Bandvagn 206 - Air defence support vehicle

==== Retired ====
- Ford Mk VI - armoured car
- Sisu Pasi - armoured personnel carrier
- Panhard M3 - armoured personnel carrier
- AML-90 - armoured car
- AML-20 - armoured car

=== Aircraft ===
- Pilatus PC-9 - trainer/light attack aircraft
- CN235-100 - transport aircraft/maritime patrol aircraft
- Learjet 45 - VIP transport
- AgustaWestland AW139 - utility helicopter
- Eurocopter EC135 - utility helicopter

== Gallery ==
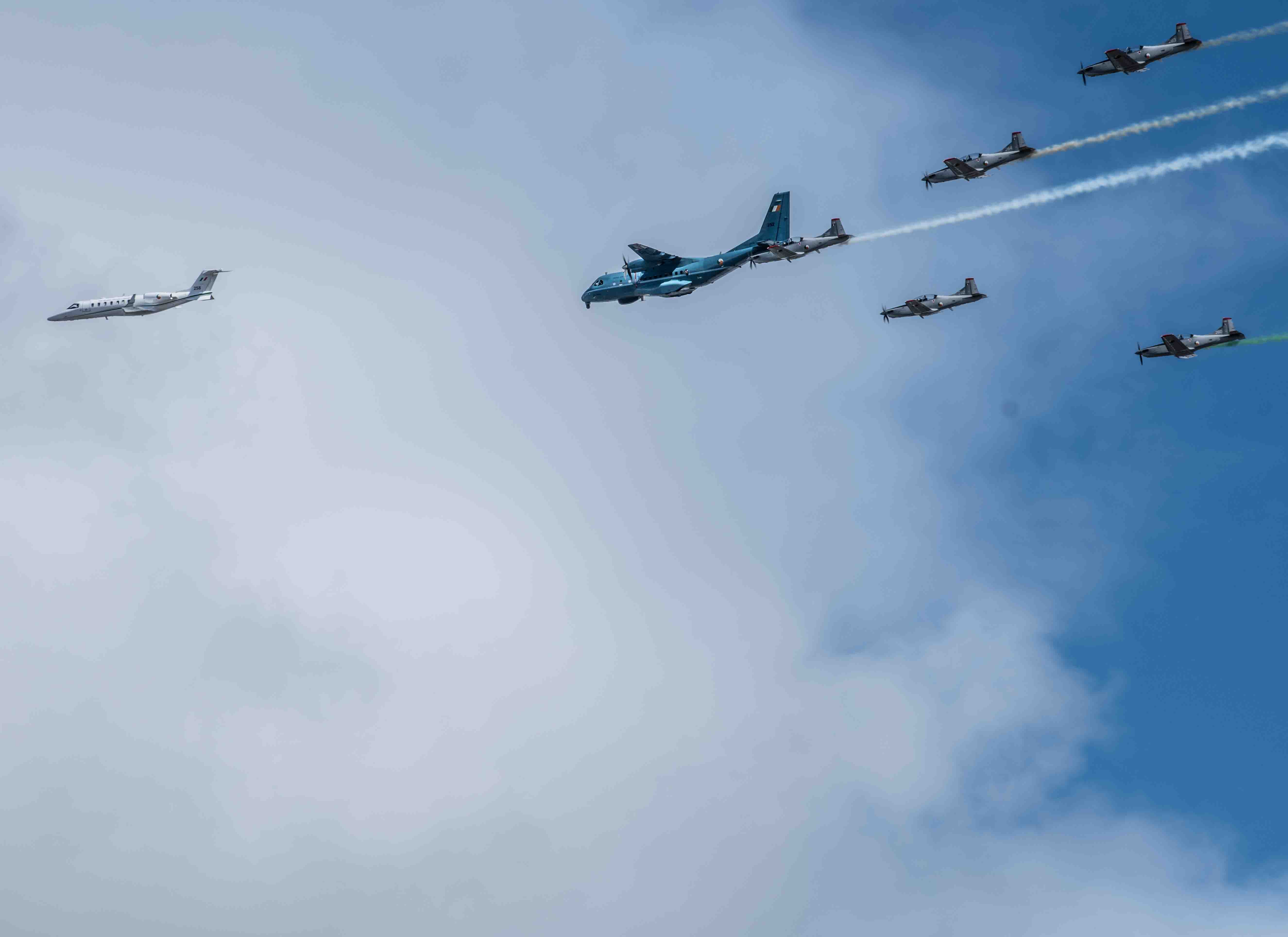
Air Corps flyover

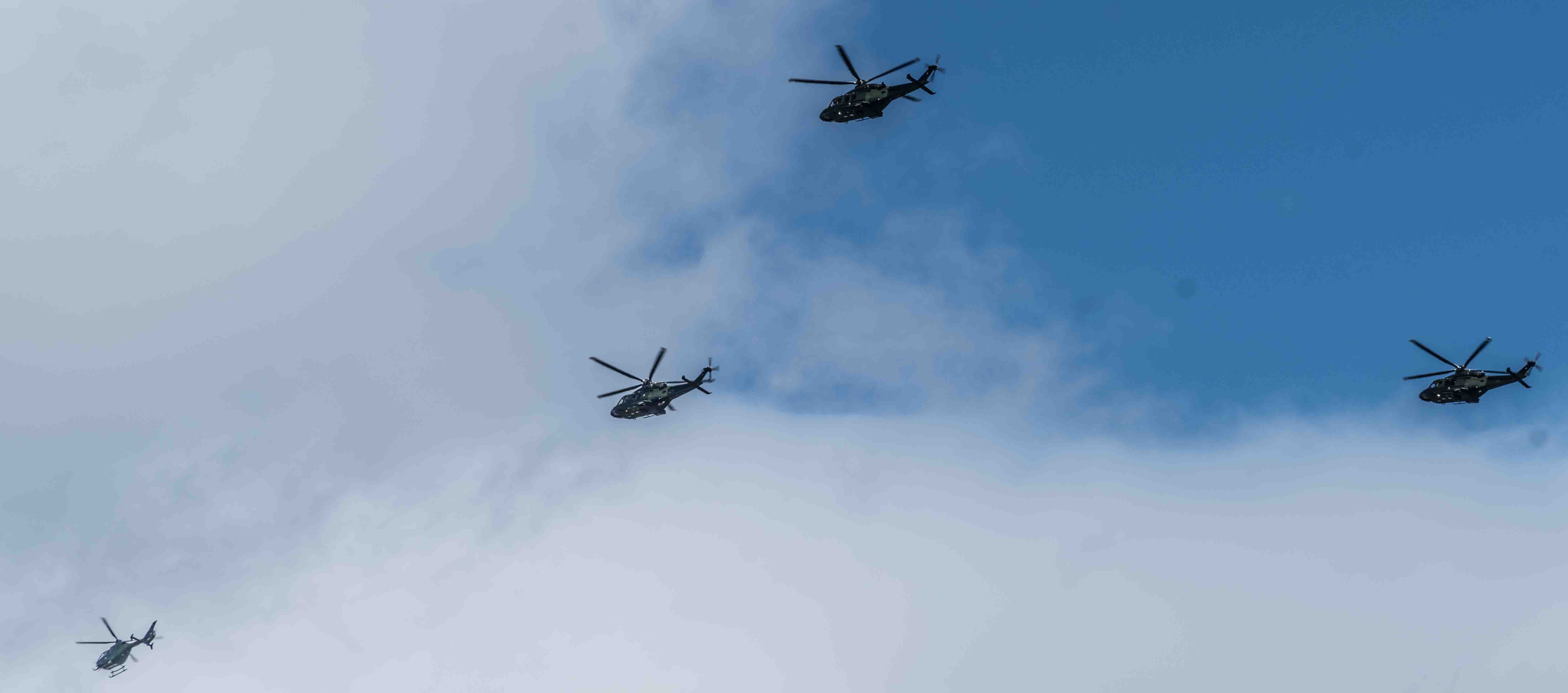
Helicopter flyover

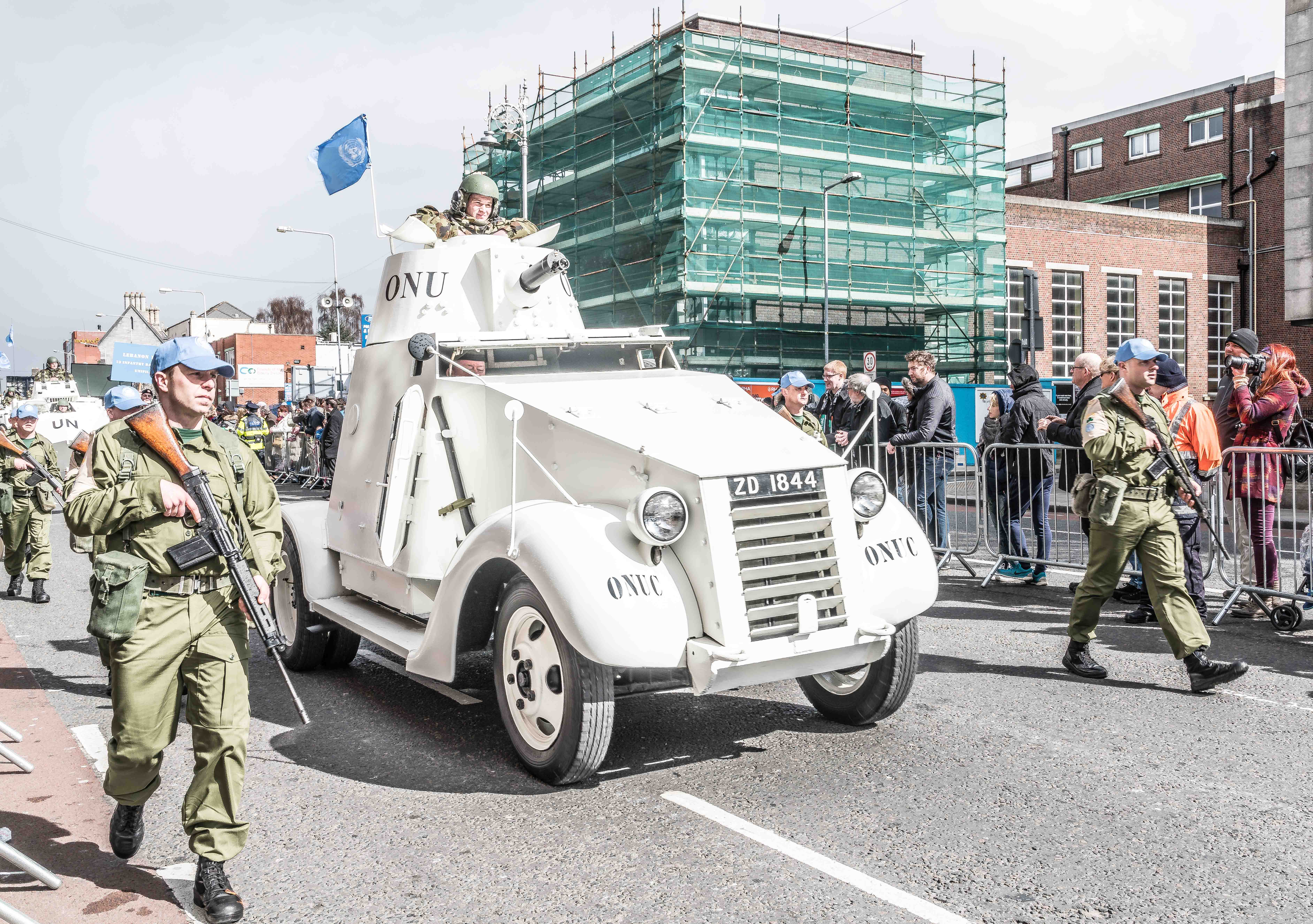
Ford Mk VI armoured car

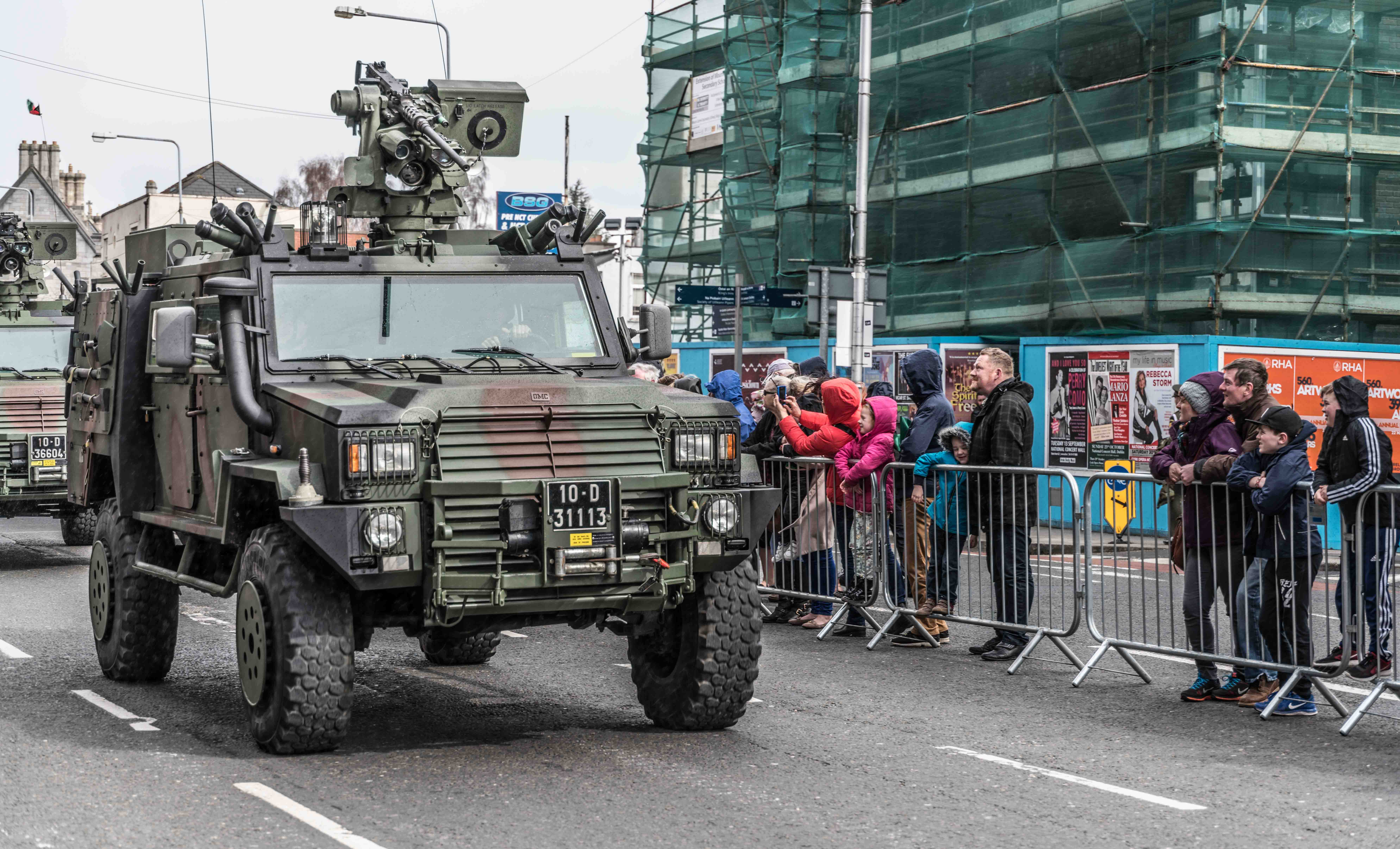
RG-32M Light Tactical Vehicle

== See also ==
- 1916 Centenary Commemorative Medal
- Centenary of the Easter Rising
- Semicentennial of the Easter Rising
