= Battlestar Galactica (disambiguation) =

Battlestar Galactica is an American science fiction franchise. It may also refer to the following aspects of the franchise:

== Television ==
- Battlestar Galactica (1978 TV series), the original television series
- Saga of a Star World, the pilot episode released theatrically in 1978 as Battlestar Galactica
- Battlestar Galactica (miniseries), the 2003 three-hour miniseries
- Battlestar Galactica (2004 TV series), the regular series that followed the miniseries

== Games ==
- Battlestar Galactica (board game), a 1979 board game by FASA
- Battlestar Galactica: The Board Game, a 2008 board game by Fantasy Flight Games
- Battlestar Galactica Collectible Card Game, a card game created by WizKids based on the 2003 reimagining
- Battlestar Galactica Role Playing Game, a 2007 tabletop role-playing game by Margaret Weis Productions
- Battlestar Galactica (2003 video game), a video game developed by Warthog Games

== Other ==
- Battlestar Galactica (comics), several comic book adaptations
- Battlestar Galactica (fictional spacecraft), the titular fictional ship
- Battlestar Galactica (roller coaster), a dueling roller coaster at Universal Studios Singapore
- Battlestar Galactica Wiki, a fan-run online encyclopedia

== See also ==
- Battlestar (disambiguation)
