= Awards and decorations of the Irish Defence Forces =

Though Ireland has no formal honours system, there are systems of awards run by the state. Among those systems is the system of awards and medals awarded to members of the Defence Forces.

In addition to the medals issued by the Irish government, members of the Defence Forces are also allowed to wear medals denoting overseas service. These medals are issued by International organisations like the United Nations, NATO, and the European Union as well as medals from other countries for United Nations Mandated peacekeeping missions.

== Defence Forces medals ==
Emblem	Description	Established	Eligibility Period	Remarks
Military Medal for Gallantry (Irish: An Bonn Míleata Calmachta)
Ribbon bar image; refer to adjacent text.	Military Medal for Gallantry with Honour (Irish: An Bonn Míleata Calmachta le hOnóir)	1944	1944–present	Known until January 1984 as Military Medal for Gallantry (1st Class). As of 2010, no medal of this class has yet been awarded.
Ribbon bar image; refer to adjacent text.	Military Medal for Gallantry with Distinction (Irish: An Bonn Míleata Calmachta le Dearscnacht)	1944	1944–present	Known until January 1984 as Military Medal for Gallantry (2nd Class). Six medals of this class have been awarded since its creation.
Ribbon bar image; refer to adjacent text.	Military Medal for Gallantry with Merit (Irish: An Bonn Míleata Calmachta le Tuillteanas)	1944	1944–present	Known until January 1984 as Military Medal for Gallantry (3rd Class). Two medals of this class have been awarded since its creation.
Distinguished Service Medal (Irish: An Bonn Seirbhíse Dearscna)
Ribbon bar image; refer to adjacent text.	Distinguished Service Medal with Honour (Irish: An Bonn Seirbhíse Dearscna le hOnóir)	18 Feb 1964	18 Feb 1964–present	Known until January 1984 as Distinguished Service Medal (1st Class).
Ribbon bar image; refer to adjacent text.	Distinguished Service Medal with Distinction (Irish: An Bonn Seirbhíse Dearscna le Dearscnacht)	18 Feb 1964	18 Feb 1964–present	Known until January 1984 as Distinguished Service Medal (2nd Class).
Ribbon bar image; refer to adjacent text.	Distinguished Service Medal with Merit (Irish: An Bonn Seirbhíse Dearscna le Tuillteanas)	18 Feb 1964	18 Feb 1964–present	Known until January 1984 as Distinguished Service Medal (3rd Class).
Ribbon bar image; refer to adjacent text.	Good Conduct Medal (Irish: An Bonn Dea-Iompair)		16 Sep 1987 – 30 Jan 1990	No longer awarded.
Service Medal (Irish: An Bonn Seirbhíse)
Ribbon bar image; refer to adjacent text.	Service Medal (Irish: An Bonn Seirbhíse)		-present	Awarded to privates and NCOs after 10 years' service.
Ribbon bar image; refer to adjacent text.	Service Medal (Irish: An Bonn Seirbhíse)		-present	Awarded to privates and NCOs after 15 years' service in exchange for their previous medal. Awarded to commissioned officers after 15 years' service; officers receive a bar after 20 years' service.
Service Medal FCÁ and SM (Irish: An Bonn Seirbhíse FCÁ agus SM)
Ribbon bar image; refer to adjacent text.	Service Medal FCÁ and SM (Irish: An Bonn Seirbhíse FCÁ agus SM)	Jun 1961	Jun 1961–	Awarded to privates, NCOs and Officers of the Reserve Defence Forces after 7 years' service.
Ribbon bar image; refer to adjacent text.	Service Medal FCÁ and SM (Irish: An Bonn Seirbhíse FCÁ agus SM)	Jun 1961	Jun 1961–	Ribbon and bar awarded to privates, NCOs and Officers of the Reserve Defence Forces after 12 years service which replaces the ribbon of the service medal awarded after 7 years. After 21 years, a bar with the numbers "21" inscribed is awarded and worn on the ribbon.
Emergency Service Medal (Irish: An Bonn Seirbhíse Éigeandála)
Ribbon bar image; refer to adjacent text.	Emergency Service Medal (Irish: An Bonn Seirbhíse Éigeandála)	Oct 1944	3 Sep 1939 – 31 Mar 1946	Awarded to members of the Permanent Defence Force, the Slua Muirí, the Fórsa Cosanta Áitiúil, Fórsa na nÓglach, 26th Infantry Battalion, the Army Nursing Service, and the Defence Forces Chaplaincy Service.
Ribbon bar image; refer to adjacent text.	Emergency Service Medal (Irish: An Bonn Seirbhíse Éigeandála)	Oct 1944	3 Sep 1939 – 31 Mar 1946	Awarded to members of the Local Security Force, the First Aid Division and Volunteer Aid Section of the Irish Red Cross Society, and the Air Raid Precautions Organisation.
Other medals awarded by the Defence Forces
Ribbon bar image; refer to adjacent text.	Military Star (Irish: An Réalt Míleata)		28 Jun 1958–present	Awarded posthumously to those members of the Permanent Defence Forces who are killed or fatally wounded by direct result of hostile action or an act perpetrated by an enemy, opposing armed force, hostile belligerent or other party, involving the use of firepower or other lethal weapon. Qualifying service is outside Ireland on military duty overseas.
Ribbon bar image; refer to adjacent text.	United Nations Peacekeepers Medal (Irish: Bonn Chosantóirí Síochána na Náisiún Aontaithe)	1989		Created in 1989. Awarded to those members of the Defence Forces who have served overseas on a United Nation Mission or United Nations Mandated Mission.
	International Operational Service Medal (Irish: Bonn nua Óglaigh na hÉireann um Sheirbhís Oibríochta Idirnáisiúnta)	Oct 2016	2014–present	Awarded to members of the Permanent Defence Forces who took part in the response to the West African Ebola virus epidemic and EU humanitarian response to the European migrant crisis (Operation PONTUS).
	1916 Centenary Commemorative Medal (Irish: Bonn Comórtha Céad Bliain)	Dec 2016	2016	Awarded to all personnel of the Permanent Defence Forces (PDF) and Reserve Defence Forces (RDF) who served in 2016 in recognition of the role they played to commemorate 100 years since the 1916 Easter Rising.
	Siege of Jadotville Medal (Irish: An Bonn Jadotville)	Dec 2017	1961	Awarded to all personnel of "A" Company with Irish Army ONUC who served at the Siege of Jadotville in recognition of their bravery and courage.

Notes:

- The Distinguished Service Medal (An Bonn Seirbhíse Dearscna) is the second highest award of the Defence Forces. It is awarded for individual acts of bravery, courage, leadership, resource or devotion to duty while serving with the Defence Forces, but below the level meriting award of the Military Medal for Gallantry. Established in 1964, it is awarded in three classes with Honour, with Distinction, or with Merit.
- The Good Conduct Medal (An Bonn Dea-Iompair) was an award presented to non-commissioned officers and privates. Awarded between 16 September 1987 and 30 January 1990, it recognised individual meritorious service and exemplary conduct.
- The Service Medal (An Bonn Seirbhíse) is awarded to non-commissioned officers and privates after 10 years of service and after 15 years of service to officers. At 15 years of service non-commissioned officers are awarded the medal with the same ribbon as officers with a medal bar. At 20 years, officers are awarded a bar to the medal as well.
- The Service Medal (LDF and NSR) (An Bonn Seirbhíse (FCÁ agus SM)) is awarded to those members of the Local Defence Force or the Naval Service Reserve who complete at least seven years of service. At 12 years the medal is awarded with a different ribbon and a medal bar, while at 21 years a second bar with 21 inscribed in its centre was awarded.
- The Emergency Service Medal (An Bonn Seirbhíse Éigeandála) was established in 1944 to recognise service during The Emergency. The medal was awarded for at least 365 days of either continuous or cumulative service between 3 September 1939 and 31 March 1946. Awarded with two different types of ribbons, it recognised 11 groups for service during The Emergency, with the reverse of the medal indicating the group under which the recipient served.
- The United Nations Peacekeepers Medal (An Bonn Chosantóirí Síochána na Náisiún Aontaithe) is awarded to those members of the Defence Forces who have served overseas on a United Nation Mission or United Nations Mandated Mission. Created in 1989, no more than one medal may be awarded to any person.
- The Military Star (An Réalt Míleata) can be awarded posthumously to those members of the Permanent Defence Forces who are killed or fatally wounded by direct result of hostile action or an act perpetrated by an enemy, opposing armed force, hostile belligerent or other party, involving the use of firepower or other lethal weapon. Qualifying service is outside Ireland on military duty overseas.
- The International Operational Service Medal (Irish: Bonn nua Óglaigh na hÉireann um Sheirbhís Oibríochta Idirnáisiúnta) is awarded to those members of the Defence Forces who have served overseas on a mission for which no other medal has been awarded.
- The 1916 Centenary Commemorative Medal (Irish: Bonn Comórtha Céad Bliain) was awarded to all members of the Permanent and Reserve Defence Forces who were on active service throughout the year 2016, a century since the 1916 Easter Rising, in acknowledgement for the ceremonial role played by Óglaigh na hÉireann across all aspects of the centenary commemorations programme.

== United Nations medals ==
Emblem	Description	Qualifying Period	Eligibility Period	Remarks
Ribbon bar image; refer to adjacent text.	United Nations Medal for UNTSO	180 days		
Ribbon bar image; refer to adjacent text.	United Nations Medal for UNMOGIP	180 days		
Ribbon bar image; refer to adjacent text.	United Nations Medal for UNOGIL	180 days		Same pattern as the medal for UNTSO .
Ribbon bar image; refer to adjacent text.	United Nations Medal for ONUC	90 days		Original version was of the same pattern as the medal for UNTSO, with the addition of a clasp reading "CONGO". A distinctive design was introduced in 1963.
Ribbon bar image; refer to adjacent text.	United Nations Medal for UNTEA	180 days		
Ribbon bar image; refer to adjacent text.	United Nations Medal for UNFICYP	90 days		
Ribbon bar image; refer to adjacent text.	United Nations Medal for UNIPOM	180 days		Same pattern as the medal for UNMOGIP.
Ribbon bar image; refer to adjacent text.	United Nations Medal for UNEF II	90 days		
Ribbon bar image; refer to adjacent text.	United Nations Medal for UNDOF	90 days		
Ribbon bar image; refer to adjacent text.	United Nations Medal for UNIFIL	90 days		
Ribbon bar image; refer to adjacent text.	United Nations Medal for UNHQ	90 days		For service on secondment to UN Headquarters in New York.
Ribbon bar image; refer to adjacent text.	United Nations Medal for UNIIMOG	90 days		
Ribbon bar image; refer to adjacent text.	United Nations Medal for UNTAG	90 days		
Ribbon bar image; refer to adjacent text.	United Nations Medal for ONUCA	90 days		
Ribbon bar image; refer to adjacent text.	United Nations Medal for UNAVEM	90 days		
Ribbon bar image; refer to adjacent text.	United Nations Special Service Medal	90 days		Awarded to Irish personnel for service in: UNSCOM; UNSMA
Ribbon bar image; refer to adjacent text.	United Nations Medal for MINURSO	90 days		
Ribbon bar image; refer to adjacent text.	United Nations Medal for UNIKOM	90 days		
Ribbon bar image; refer to adjacent text.	United Nations Medal for UNAMIC	90 days		
Ribbon bar image; refer to adjacent text.	United Nations Medal for ONUSAL	90 days		
Ribbon bar image; refer to adjacent text.	United Nations Medal for UNTAC	90 days		
Ribbon bar image; refer to adjacent text.	United Nations Medal for UNPROFOR	90 days		
Ribbon bar image; refer to adjacent text.	United Nations Medal for UNOSOM	90 days		
Ribbon bar image; refer to adjacent text.	United Nations Medal for UNMIH	90 days		
Ribbon bar image; refer to adjacent text.	United Nations Medal for UNAMIR	90 days		Awarded to members of the Irish-Rwandan support group (Irish soldiers were not deployed as part of UNAMIR).
Ribbon bar image; refer to adjacent text.	United Nations Medal for UNPREDEP	90 days		
Ribbon bar image; refer to adjacent text.	United Nations Medal for UNMOP	90 days		
Ribbon bar image; refer to adjacent text.	United Nations Medal for UNTAES	90 days		
Ribbon bar image; refer to adjacent text.	United Nations Medal for UNMIK	90 days		
Ribbon bar image; refer to adjacent text.	United Nations Medal for UNAMET/UNTAET/UNMISET	90 days		
Ribbon bar image; refer to adjacent text.	United Nations Medal for MONUC	90 days		
Ribbon bar image; refer to adjacent text.	United Nations Medal for UNMEE	90 days		
Ribbon bar image; refer to adjacent text.	United Nations Medal for UNMIL	90 days		
Ribbon bar image; refer to adjacent text.	United Nations Medal for MINUCI/ONUCI	90 days		
Ribbon bar image; refer to adjacent text.	United Nations Medal for MINURCAT II	90 days		
Ribbon bar image; refer to adjacent text.	United Nations Medal for MONUSCO	90 days		
