= Emergency Service Medal =

Emergency Service Medal An Bonn Seirbhíse Éigeandála
- Double Lined Ribbon. Single Lined Ribbon.
- Type: Military service medal
- Awarded for: 1 or more years of service during The Emergency
- Presented by: Ireland
- Eligibility: Members of the Defence Forces, Maritime Inscription, Local Defence Force, Second Line Reserve, Army Nursing Service, Chaplaincy Service, Construction Corps, Local Security Force, Irish Red Cross Society First Aid and Volunteer Aid Divisions, Air Raid Precautions Service, and Construction Corps.
- Status: No longer awarded
- First award: October 1944

The Emergency Service Medal (Irish: An Bonn Seirbhíse Éigeandála) is a military decoration awarded to members of the Irish Defence Forces who served during The Emergency from 1939 to 1946.

Due to faulty record keeping during the period, the total number of medals issued is not known.

== Description ==
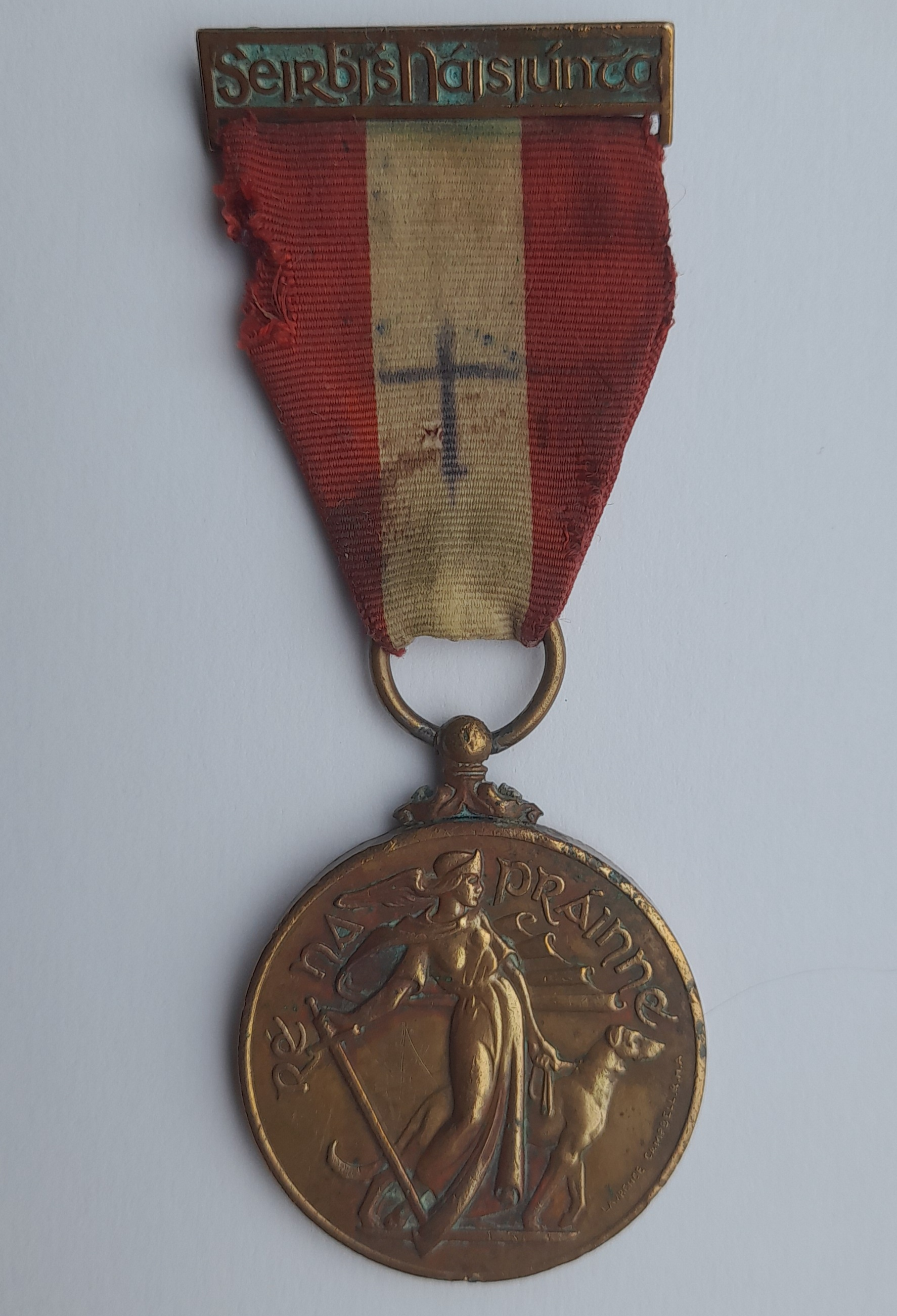
The example Medal shown reads "An Fórsa Cosanta Áitiúil", the Irish name for the Local Defence Force.

The medal is made of bronze. On the front, there is an image of a woman with a dog beside her, with the words "Re na Práinne" inscribed in Irish along the top. On the back, there is an olive branch with the year "1939" on one side of it, and "1946" on the other. At the top there are words inscribed in Irish. The words are different across the 11 variants, with variant being the Irish name of the organisation or group the individual who received the medal is a member of.

The ribbon was issued in two types. Those who served in a combat role, like the Army and Local Defence Force, had a scarlet red ribbon with two white centre stripes. While those who served in a non-combat roles, like the Local Security Force or Irish Red Cross, had a scarlet red ribbon with one white centre stripe.

There is a bar at the top of all medals, which reads "Serbís Náisiúnta". If an individual completed an extra two years of service during The Emergency, they would be awarded an extra bar with "1939-1946" inscribed on the front. Up to two extra bars could be earned, both having the same design.

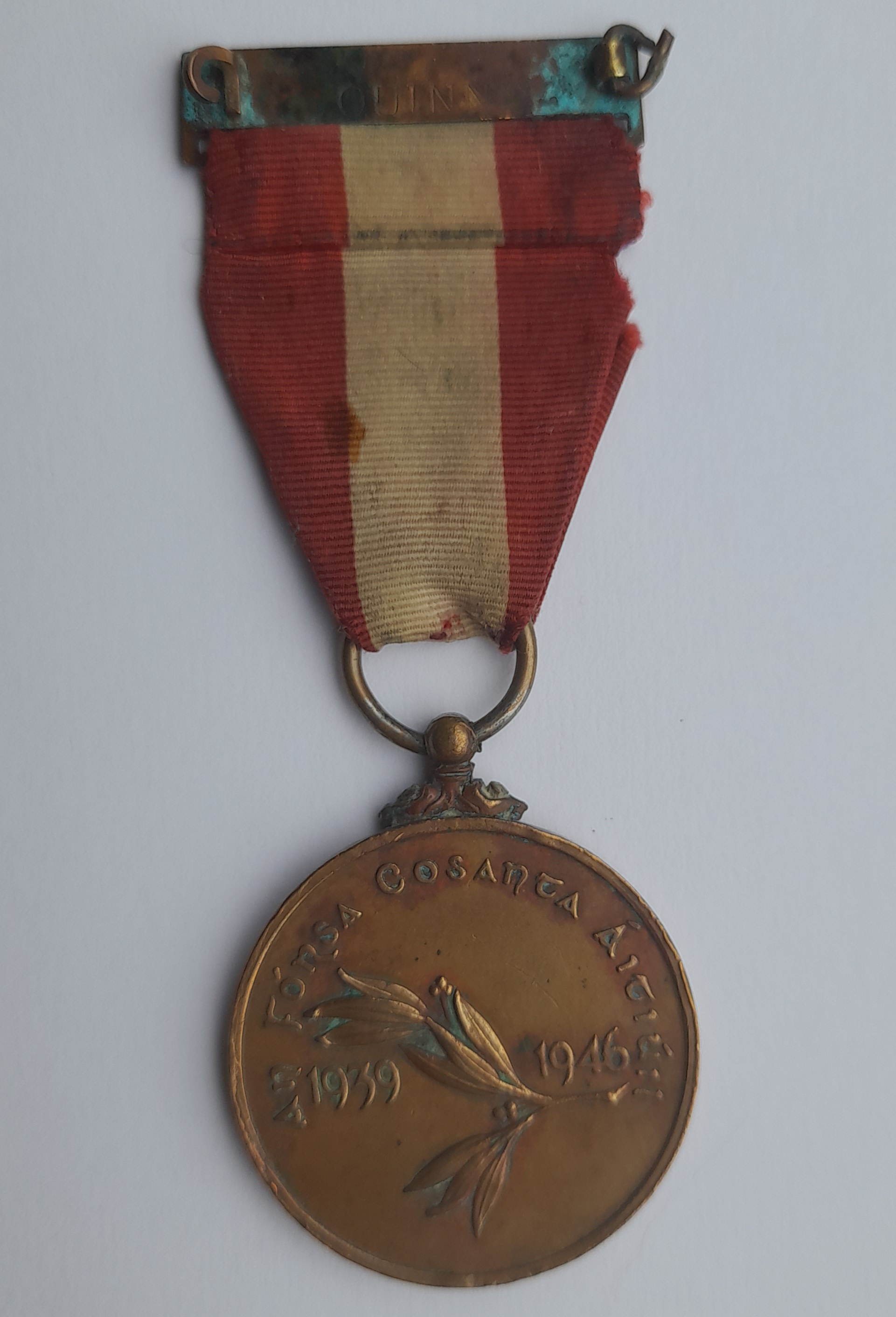

== Eligibility ==
The medal was eligible for members of the Defence Forces including the Army, Army Air Corps, Marine Service, Maritime Inscription, Local Defence Force, Second Line Reserve (Fórsa na nÓglach), Army Nursing Service, Chaplaincy Service, Construction Corps, 26th Infantry Battalion, Local Security Force, Irish Red Cross First Aid and Volunteer Aid Divisions, Air Raid Precautions Service, and Construction Corps who served for 365 days or more during the Emergency.
