= Centenary of the Easter Rising =

Centenary celebrations of 1916 Easter Rising in Ireland

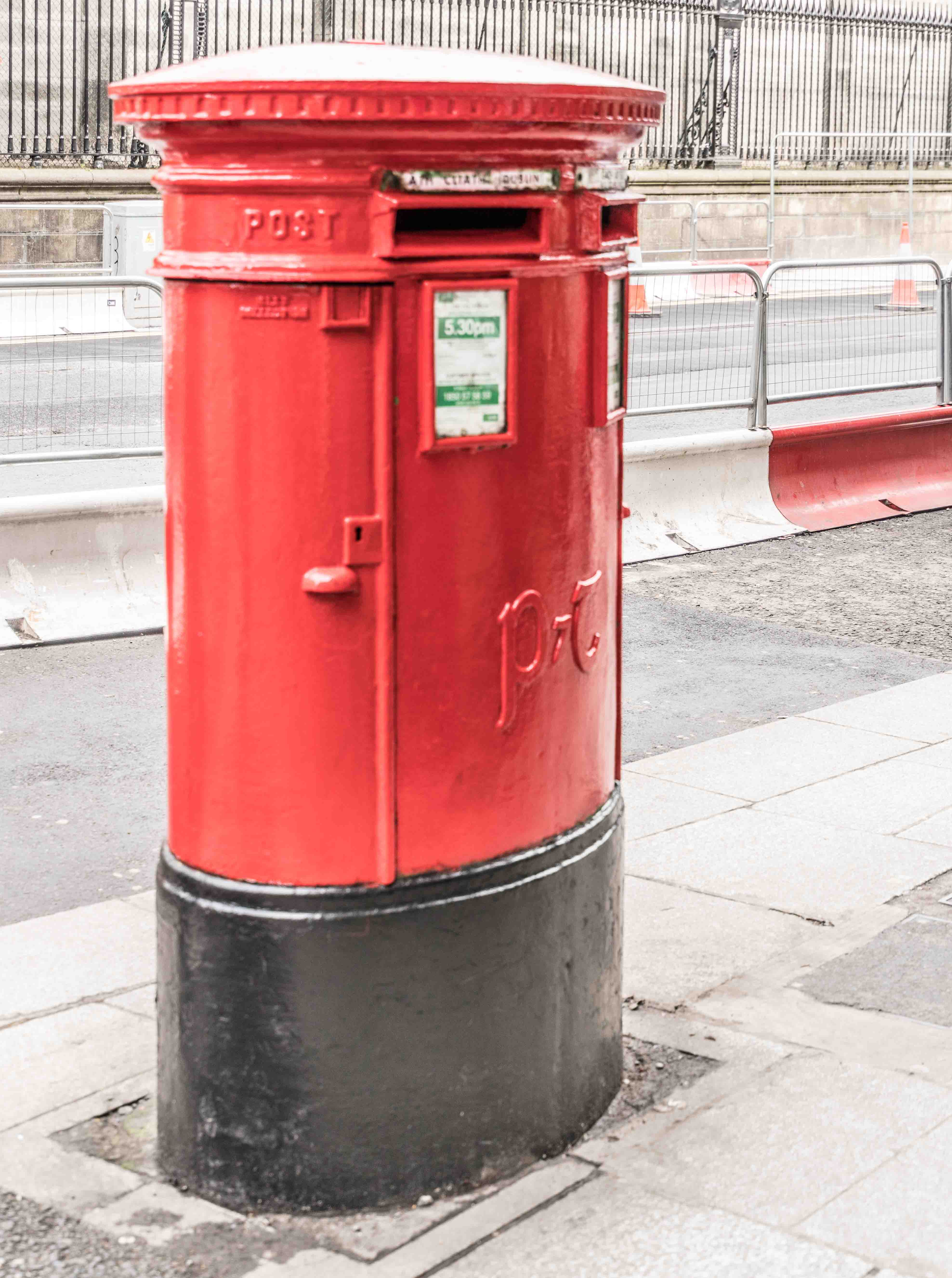
A pillar box painted red to commemorate the centenary of the Rising. Post boxes in Ireland were red during British rule but were painted green following Independence.

The centenary of the Easter Rising in Dublin, Ireland occurred in 2016. Many events were held throughout the country to mark the occasion.

== Events ==
Note that Easter Sunday fell on 27 March in 2016 and on 23 April in 1916. The Rising began on Easter Monday, 24 April 1916.

=== 20 January ===
On 20 January 2016, Ireland's first-ever commemorative €2 coin went into circulation to mark the centenary. It was designed by Emmet Mullins and featured, alongside the years 1916 and 2016, a statue of Hibernia atop the General Post Office and the word Hibernia in Book of Kells-influenced lettering.

=== 26 March ===
A weekend of commemorations marking the occasion began on Easter Eve (26 March), as President Michael D. Higgins laid a wreath at the Garden of Remembrance in Dublin. This was preceded by the traditional Irish song "The Parting Glass" being performed by the Island of Ireland Peace Choir and succeeded by a minute's silence. Acting Taoiseach Enda Kenny and Acting Tánaiste Joan Burton were also present. Relatives of the dead laid their own wreaths following President Higgins.

Later that day, the President gave a keynote address at a ceremony in the Royal Dublin Society and met 4,000 relatives of the dead. Later, he attended a commemorative concert at Liberty Hall Theatre.

On the same day, Acting Taoiseach Enda Kenny and Acting Arts Minister Heather Humphreys opened a permanent visitor centre at the General Post Office, scene of the rebel occupation in 1916. Also attending was former Taoiseach Liam Cosgrave, whose father W. T. Cosgrave reopened the building in 1929 after the damage it sustained during the insurrection was repaired.

A commemorative service was held at the Unitarian Church on St Stephen's Green, and the names of all the Rising fatalities in Dublin were read aloud.

=== 27 March ===
The Easter Rising centenary parade occurred in Dublin city on Easter Sunday, 27 March. It was shown live on RTÉ Television and was attended by President Higgins and his wife Sabina, Taoiseach Enda Kenny and his wife Fionnuala, the Garda Commissioner Nóirín O'Sullivan, Ceann Comhairle Seán Ó Fearghaíl, former Presidents Mary Robinson and Mary McAleese, former Taoisigh Bertie Ahern (and his brother Noel), Brian Cowen and Liam Cosgrave, Fianna Fáil leader Micheál Martin, and Martin McGuinness (representing the Office of the First Minister and deputy First Minister in Northern Ireland).

=== 28 March ===
On Easter Monday (28 March), President Higgins and Acting Taoiseach Enda Kenny laid wreaths at the Stone Breakers' Yard in Kilmainham Gaol, scene of the 1916 executions. Before this occurred, the flag of Ireland was lowered to half mast in front of Defence Forces personnel and relatives of the dead. Afterwards, there was a minute's silence, the "Piper's Lament" and the "Last Post" were played, then Army captain Glen Harmon held aloft a shining sword to serve as an introduction to the national anthem. Tánaiste Joan Burton, defence minister Simon Coveney, justice minister Frances Fitzgerald, Fianna Fáil leader Micheál Martin, and Martin McGuinness were also present.

That evening, RTÉ broadcast the 85-minute show Centenary, directed by Cillian Fennell, live from the Bord Gáis Energy Theatre; it had dance troupes, filmed pieces of people all across the world reading the Proclamation of the Irish Republic, and among the singers appearing were Imelda May, Dónal Lunny, Sharon Shannon and Colm Wilkinson.

=== 3 April ===
On 3 April, a "remembrance wall" was unveiled at Glasnevin Cemetery. It included names of soldiers and civilians who died during the Easter Rising. However, a spelling mistake on the monument was quickly spotted; the first word Éirí ("Rising") appeared as Eírí. The unveiling was shown live on RTÉ and acting Taoiseach Enda Kenny laid a wreath.

=== 4 April ===
Silver and gold commemorative coins to mark the centenary, designed by Michael Guilfoyle, went on sale on Monday 4 April. They were only made available to collectors, and did not go into general circulation.

=== 24 April ===
On Sunday 24 April, events occurred to mark the centenary date of the start of the Rising. President Higgins, Taoiseach Kenny, members of the Government, Oireachtas and judiciary attended a ceremony at Arbour Hill, where a requiem Mass was overseen by the Roman Catholic Archbishop of Dublin Diarmuid Martin. An interfaith ceremony was held at the graveside of the executed Rising leaders, and President Higgins laid another wreath.

Representatives of the Defence Forces were present at the General Post Office to raise the Irish flag aloft at midday.

Local events were held nationwide, including at Pádraig Pearse's Cottage in Rosmuc; in Carrick-on-Shannon (45 km from Kiltyclogher where Proclamation of Independence signatory Seán Mac Diarmada was born); and in Sligo (close to the estate of Constance Markievicz).

Meanwhile, crowds gathered in Croke Park for the Gaelic Athletic Association's Laochra, a theatrical event which began after the National Football League final.

On the same day, Irish Americans gathered in Manhattan, New York, for the official U.S. commemoration of the centenary, with Minister for the Environment, Community and Local Government Alan Kelly representing the Government.

=== 3 May ===
Commemorations marking the executions of the rebels occurred between Tuesday, 3 May and Thursday, 12 May.
