= Abhijit Guha (general) =

Indian lieutenant general

Abhijit Guha is a retired lieutenant general of the Indian Army who served as head of the UN Mission to Support the Hodeidah Agreement (UNMHA) in Yemen.

== Education ==
Guha graduated from the National Defence College, the Defence Services Staff College, and the College of Combat.

== Career ==
During 1992–1993 in Cambodia, he was part of the United Nations Transitional Authority as a military observer.

Between 2009 and 2013, he was the military adviser at the Office of Military Affairs of the United Nations Department of Peacekeeping Operations. He retired from the Indian Army in 2013 as a lieutenant general. After retirement, he was a part of the Expert Panel on the 2014 Technology and Innovation in UN Peacekeeping and the 2015 High Level Independent Panel on Peace Operations. He has participated in United Nations’ investigations in the Middle East and Africa.

In September 2019, Guha became the Head of the UN Mission to Support the Hodeidah Agreement (UNMHA) and the Chair 🪑 of the Redeployment Coordination Committee in Yemen.
