= Patrick Cammaert =

Dutch general (born 1950)

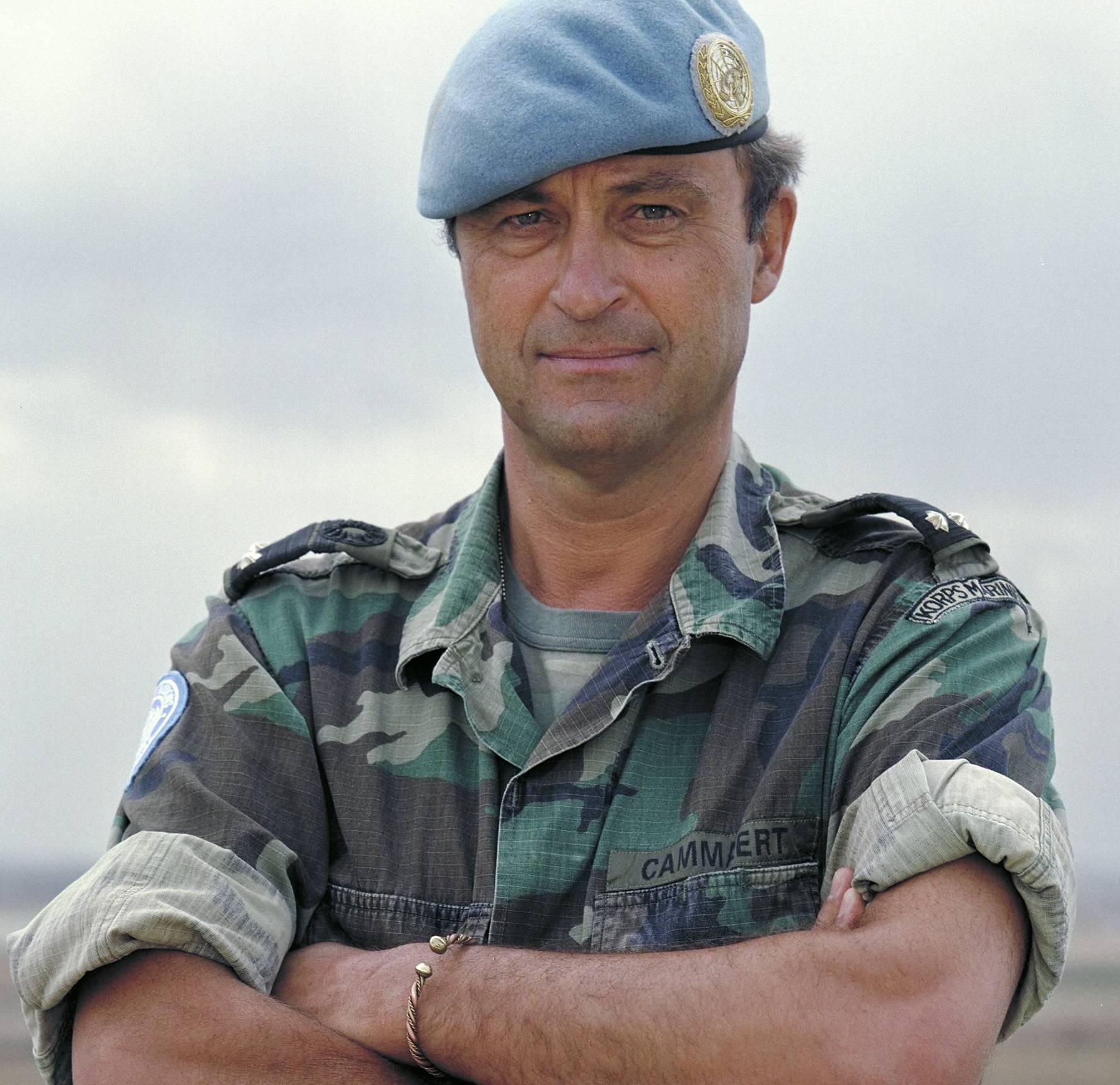
Patrick Cammaert in 2001

Major General Patrick Cammaert (Dutch: [ˈpɛtrɪ ˈkɑmaːrt]; born April 11, 1950 in Nijmegen) is a retired Dutch general who served as the United Nations Force Commander for the Eastern Democratic Republic of the Congo. He served since 1968 and graduated in parachuter and commando courses. He was previously the Military Advisor to the Secretary-General of the United Nations. Prior to that position, he was the Force Commander of the United Nations Mission in Ethiopia and Eritrea (UNMEE), as the Military Adviser in the Department of Peacekeeping Operations, and has spent a career in the Royal Netherlands Marines specializing in peacekeeping operations.

Cammaert is notable for having implemented many of the recommendations of the Brahimi Report.

In 2008 he received the Carnegie-Wateler peace prize.

== Education ==
Cammaert graduated parachuter and commando courses and holds a degree of the Dutch Higher Command and Staff College and passed the Top Management Course at the Armed Forces War College in The Hague.

== UN peacekeeping ==
Maj. Gen. (Ret.) Patrick Cammaert has served 1992 in Cambodia as battalion Commander for UNTAC. In 1995 he served in Bosnia-Herzegovina as Assistant Chief of Staff for UNPROFOR. In 2000 he became the head of the UN Mission in Ethiopia and Eritrea (UNMEE). From 2003 to 2005 General Cammaert was the Military Adviser for the Department of Peacekeeping Operations of the UN (DPKO) in New York as well as the UN Development Programme, the UN Women on Integrated Training Development, the protection of civilians from the threat of physical violence and sexual gender-based violence in armed conflict.

In 2005 Cammaert took command of the 15,000-strong UN peacekeeping force in Eastern Democratic Republic of the Congo. His principle during this mission was that "UN forces are impartial and not neutral". In early 2005 Cammaert's Eastern Division killed 50 fighters in Ituri after losing nine of its own soldiers in an ambush.

In early 2016, Cammaert led a Headquarters-Board of Inquiry on the circumstances of the clashes that occurred in the United Nations Mission in South Sudan (UNMISS) protection of civilians site in Malakal, South Sudan, on 17–18 February 2016. Later that year, he was appointed by United Nations Secretary-General Ban Ki-moon to lead an independent special investigation into the violence in Juba, South Sudan, in July 2016, and the response of the UNMISS.

On 22 December 2018, Cammaert began leading the United Nations Mission to support the Hudaydah Agreement to oversee the UN-brokered ceasefire and redeployment of forces in the city of Al Hudaydah in Yemen. On 17 January 2019, Cammaert's convoy was reported to have been fired upon by unknown assailants, though Cammaert remained uninjured. On 31 January 2019, he was replaced by Danish Major General Michael Lollesgaard.

Cammaert is also a regular senior mentor at UN Senior Leadership Courses and at Intensive Orientation Courses for new force commanders. In 2015, he was a member of the High Level Advisory Group for the global study on United Nations Security Council Resolution 1325.

== Other activities ==
- Center for Civilians in Conflict (CIVIC), Member of the Board of Directors
- Mukomeze Foundation, Member of the Board
- Georgetown Institute for Women, Peace and Security, Member of the Advisory Board
- Roméo Dallaire Child Soldiers Initiative, Member of the Board

== Recognition ==
On October 10, 2008, Cammaert received the Carnegie Wateler Peace Prize for his commitment to world peace.

== Sources ==
- Biography at monuc.org
