= Abhijit Guha (anthropologist) =

Indian anthropologist

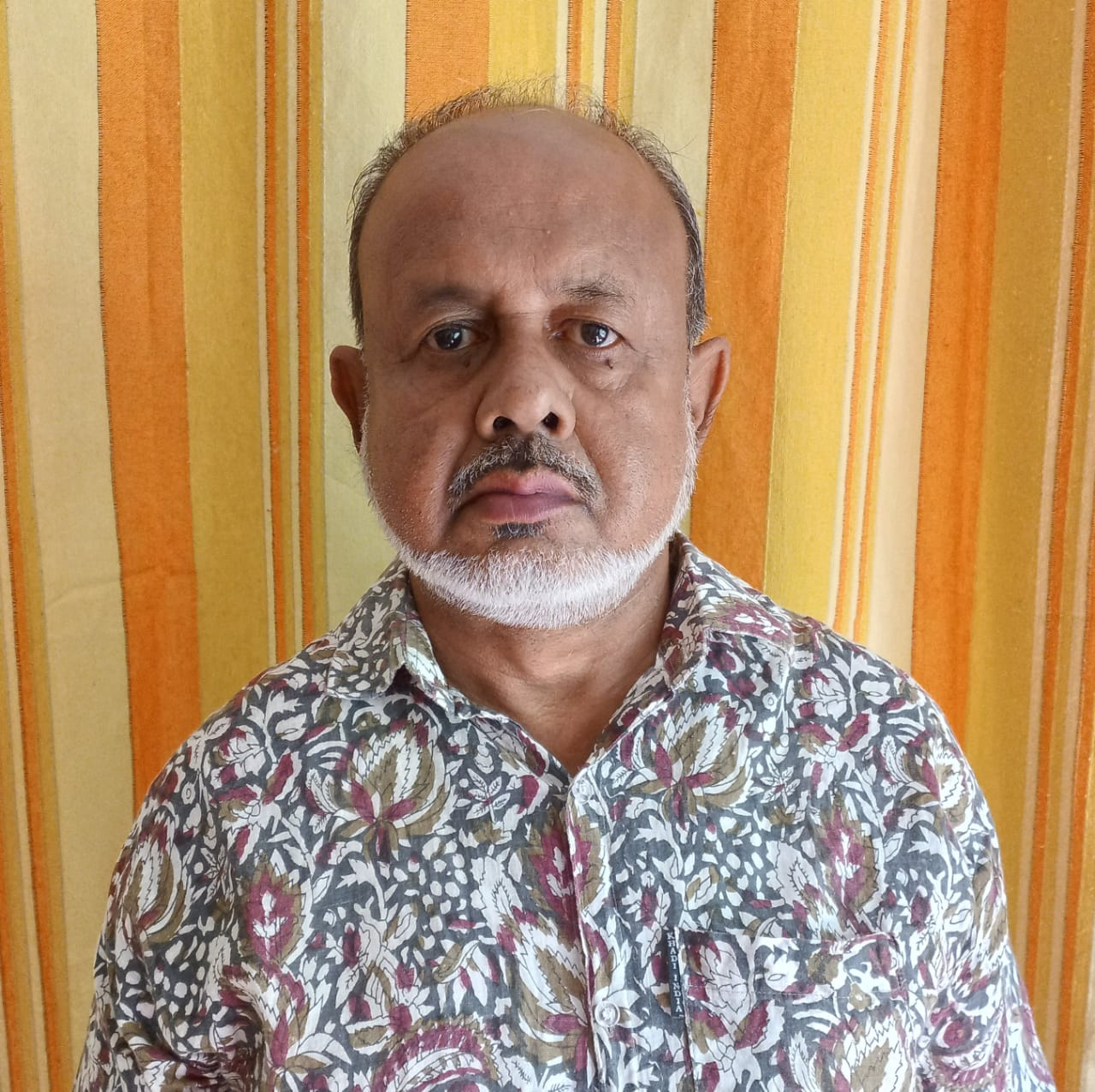
Abhijit Guha

Abhijit Guha (born 1956 in Kolkata) is an Indian anthropologist.

== Career ==
Guha studied anthropology at the University of Calcutta to Masters level and M.Phil. in Environmental Science and was an ICSSR scholar at the Centre for Studies in Social Sciences, researching the Bengali kinship system.

Guha then taught and studied at Vidyasagar University in Medinipur, West Bengal for some thirty years. He was first employed by the university in December 1985 as a Lecturer and then appointed reader in 1998, took his Ph.D. in 2002 (his thesis was titled Land acquisition among the cultivators of rural Medinipur: an anthropological appraisal), and retired as a full professor in 2016. He was a senior fellow of the Indian Council of Social Science Research at the Institute of Development Studies Kolkata from 2018 to 2020. His main area of research is development caused displacement and land acquisition on which Guha has published in peer-reviewed journals including Economic and Political Weekly He was a senior fellow of the Indian Council of Social Science Research(ICSSR) at the Institute of Development Studies Kolkata from 2018 to 2020.[1] Guha's topic of research under the ICSSR Senior Fellowship was on the nationalist trends in Indian anthropology on which he has published an occasional paper and a number of articles in peer-reviewed journals and a book. One of Guha's important contribution was on rediscovering Tarak Chandra Das who was a forgotten anthropologist in India. Guha has published a good number of articles and a book on Das's contributions to Indian anthropology, particularly his work on the Bengal Famine of 1940s. Guha has researched intensively on the founder of his own University Professor Anil Kumar Gayen and published articles on Gayen. One interesting research area of Guha was the study of University campuses, including his own University. Guha is fond of reviewing books, which ranges between hard core kinship studies to literary anthropology.

With his Phd student Dr.Santanu Panda Guha has explored the history of "Criminal Tribes" in India and published a book and a number of articles.

In 1994 Abhijit Guha debated with the Nobel Laureate Amartya Sen on the Darwinian view of progress in the journal Population and Development Review

Guha was invited to the Lok Sabha as an expert participant during the drafting of land acquisition and resettlement amendment legislation in 2007-2008. Abhijit Guha acted as a reviewer for the WennerGrenn Foundation for Anthropological Research in 2022

Guha was engaged in a collaborative research project with CWDS and Vidyasagar University during 1997-98 on women empowerment with the famous feminist Dr.Vina Majumdar and wrote a book chapter on this theme. He is engaged in the popularization of anthropology by writing books and articles in the vernacular.

== Selected publications ==
Some of Guha's notable publications include:

- Land, Law, and the Left: The Saga of Disempowerment of the Peasantry in the Era of Globalization. Concept Publishing Company. 2007. ISBN 978-81-8069-398-4.
- Maoism in India: Ideology and Ground Reality. Jhargram: Indian National Confederation and Academy of Anthropologists. 2012. ISBN 978-81-903866-6-1.
- Tarak Chandra Das: The Unsung Hero of Indian Anthropology. Delhi: Studera Press. 2016. ISBN 978-93-85883-01-9.
- Nation-building in Indian Anthropology: Beyond the Colonial Encounter. Manohar Publishers & Distributors. 2022. ISBN 978-93-91928-73-5.
- Encountering Land Grab: An Ethnographic Journey. Routledge. 2022. ISBN 978-1-000-58897-2.
- Kanti Das, Bidhan; Chakraborty, Gorky; Guha, Abhijit (2024). Knowledge, Power and Ignorance. doi:10.4324/9781003485704. ISBN 978-1-003-48570-4.
