= Military Star =

Military Star An Bonn Chosantóirí Siochána na Náisiún Aontaithe
- Military Star ribbon
- Type: Military decoration
- Awarded for: Being killed or fatally wounded as a direct result of a hostile action or act perpetrated by an enemy, opposing armed force, hostile belligerent or other party, involving the use of firepower or other lethal weapon, in the course of service on approved military duties.
- Country: Republic of Ireland
- Presented by: Ireland
- Eligibility: Members of the Permanent Defence Force and to members of the Chaplaincy Service
- Status: Currently awarded

Precedence
- Next (higher): United Nations Peacekeepers Medal
- Next (lower): United Nations Medals

The Military Star (Irish: An Réalt Míleata) is a military decoration awarded to those members of the Irish Defence Forces or Chaplaincy Service who were killed or mortally wounded in the line of duty as a result of hostile action by an armed enemy. Initially only awarded for service related deaths that occurred outside of Ireland, in 2012 the award criteria were changed to allow awards for those killed in Ireland.

== Appearance ==
The medal is bronze and takes the shape of an eight-pointed star 35 mm (1.4 in) wide. The obverse of the medal depicts Cúchulainn in death in the centre of the medal. The reverse is blank so that the deceased soldier's name, army number, and date and location of death may be engraved.

The medal hangs from a ribbon 35 mm (1.4 in) wide. The ribbon is purple with 2 mm (0.079 in) black stripes at the edge. In the centre is a white stripe 8 mm (0.31 in) wide bisected by a 2 mm (0.079 in) stripe of orange. The white stripe is bordered by 4 mm (0.16 in) green stripes on either side.

The ribbon is suspended at the top from a bronze bar bearing the word, in relief, REMEMBRANCE.

The medal and ribbon were designed by Corporal Dan O'Connell, Defence Forces Ceremonial (now retired).
