= United Nations Peacekeepers Medal (Ireland) =

United Nations Peacekeepers Medal An Bonn Chosantóirí Siochána na Náisiún Aontaithe
- UN Peacekeepers Medal ribbon
- Type: Service medal
- Awarded for: Awarded to Defence Forces personnel who have served overseas on a mission for which no other medal has been awarded.
- Presented by: Ireland
- Eligibility: Officers, Non-Commissioned Officers and privates/seaman/aircrew of the Defence Forces and members of the DF Nursing and Chaplaincy Services.
- Post-nominals: IOSM
- Status: Currently awarded
- First award: October 2016

Precedence
- Next (higher): Emergency Service Medal
- Next (lower): Military Star

The United Nations Peacekeepers Medal (Irish: An Bonn Chosantóirí Siochána na Náisiún Aontaithe) is awarded to those members of the Irish Defence Forces or Chaplaincy Service who have served overseas on a United Nation Mission or United Nations Mandated Mission.

== Criteria ==
The UN Peacekeepers Medal was introduced in 1989. Members, both current and former, of the Defence Forces or Chaplaincy Service who have served with a United Nations peacekeeping mission and have earned a United Nations Medal are eligible for award of this Irish Defence Force honour. The UN Peacekeepers Medal may only be awarded once to an individual. The period of qualifying service is waived for those members who are killed or presumed killed while serving overseas. In those cases the medal is awarded posthumously and presented to the next of kin.

== Appearance ==
The medal is round and made of white metal. The obverse of the medal depicts Éire, a national personification of Ireland, standing along a shoreline while releasing a dove over the sea. The dove carries an olive branch in its beak. Farther out, on the horizon is a flock of wilde geese in flight. The reverse bears the legend in Irish above, NA NÁISIÚIN AONTAIṪE DON tSÍOĊÁIN, and below in English, UNITED NATIONS FOR PEACE. The medal is attached to the ribbon by a straight unswivelled bar.

The medal hangs from a ribbon 35 mm (1.4 in) wide. The ribbon is composed of a central orange stripe 12 mm (0.47 in) bisected by a 3 mm (0.12 in) stripe of United Nations blue. The orange stripe is bordered by 5 mm (0.20 in) white stripes and the edges are 5 mm (0.20 in) wide green stripes.
