= United Nations Military Observer =

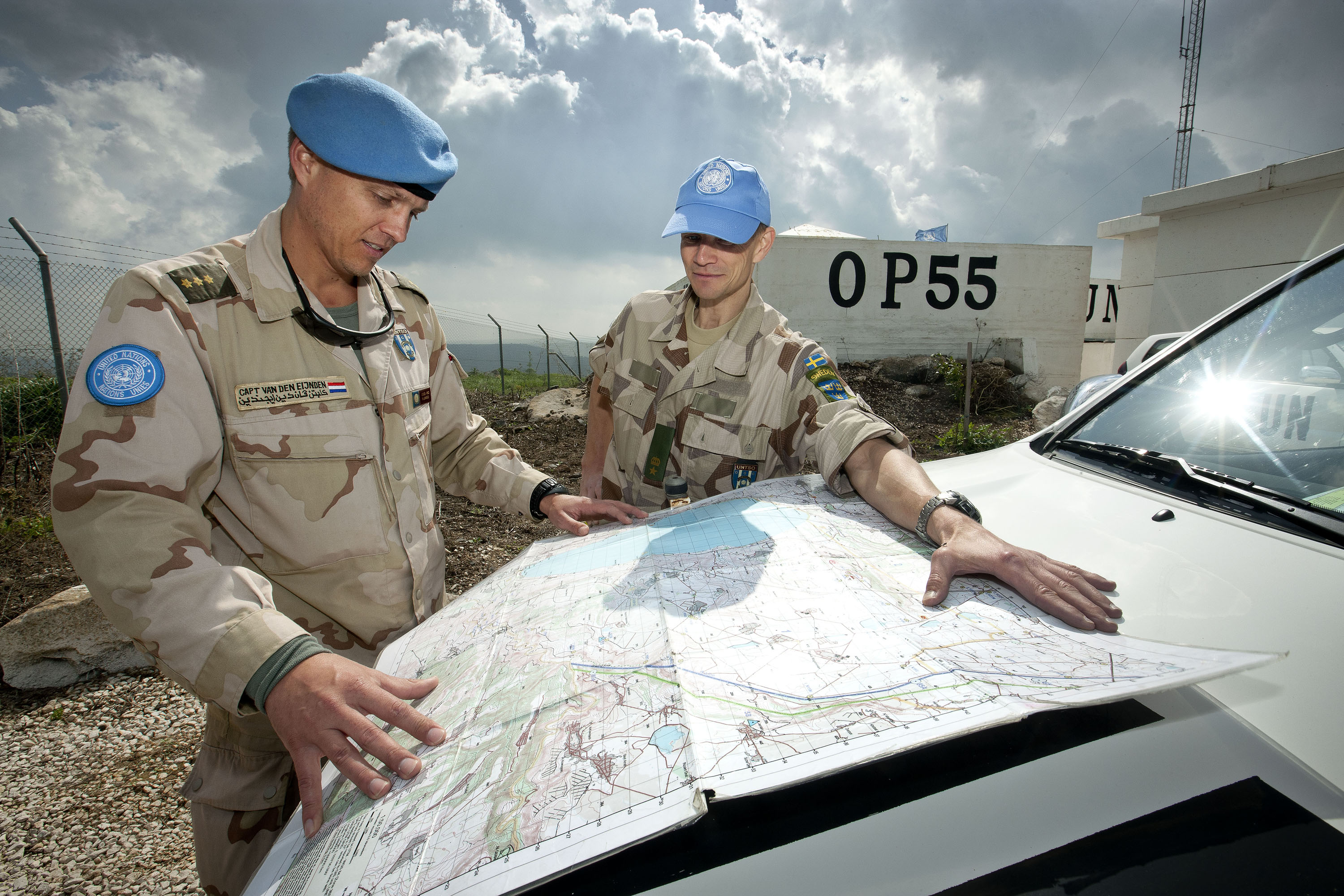
United Nations Military Observers from the United Nations Truce Supervision Organization in the Golan Heights, 2013

A United Nations Military Observer (UNMO) is a military official deployed by the United Nations to provide support to a UN mission or peace operation. Described as the "eyes and ears" of the UN Security Council, observers fulfill a variety of roles depending on scope, purpose, and status of the UN mission to which they are attached. A UNMO is generally tasked with monitoring and assessing post-conflict agreements, such as a ceasefire or armistice; the withdrawal of military forces; or the maintenance of a neutral buffer zone. Observers usually undergo special training to ensure neutrality, diplomacy, and deescalation techniques.

== Duties and responsibilities ==
- Monitor the various agreements on cease-fires, withdrawals and demilitarization.
- Ground, sea and aerial patrolling of both sides of the conflict, including the areas along the confrontation lines.
- Patrol demilitarized zone.
- Help resolve local difficulties (social, economic, etc.) by liaison with all sides of the conflict.
- Investigate allegations of aggression or ceasefire violations.

== Mission in Kashmir ==
An early and still-operating observer mission is the United Nations Military Observer Group in India and Pakistan (UNMOGIP), established on the India-Pakistan border in 1949 to monitor the ceasefire called for by the United Nations Security Council.

- Location and Headquarters: ceasefire line in Jammu and Kashmir states with major posts in Rawalpindi, Pakistan / Srinagar, India
- Primary observing officer: Croatian Major-General Dragutin Repinc appointed by Kofi Annan
- Participating observers: 113 military and civilian personnel, from 8 countries
- Casualties: 11
- Time frame:1949–2014 in India, 1949-present Pakistan

India asks UN team on Kashmir to leave Delhi premises Council.

== Similar mission in Timor-Leste ==
- Location and Headquarters: Republica Democratica Timor-Leste with major post in Dili, formerly East Timor
- Primary observing officer: Atul Khare appointed by Kofi Annan
- Participating observers: 34 with 1,600 supporting UN Police
- Casualties:
- Time frame: 2006–present, previous missions UNAMET 1999, UNTAET 1999–2002, UNMISET 2002–2005, and UNOTIL 2005–2006
