= List of University of Galway people =

The following is a list of University of Galway people, including notable alumni and faculty members of the University of Galway and its forerunners: Queen's College, Galway (QCG) created in 1845 as a college of the Queen's University of Ireland; University College, Galway (UCG) chartered in accordance with the Irish Universities Act, 1908 as a university college of the National University of Ireland; and National University of Ireland, Galway (NUI, Galway and later NUI Galway without the comma), a constituent university of the National University of Ireland and newly named since the Universities Act, 1997 until 2022.

== Alumni ==
=== Politicians ===
- Michael D. Higgins - 9th President of Ireland
- Enda Kenny - 13th Taoiseach of Ireland
- Eamon Gilmore
- Frank Fahy
- Joseph Brennan
- Séamus Kirk
- Michael Kitt
- Pat "the Cope" Gallagher
- Heather Humphreys
- Michael Ring
- Lisa Chambers
- Barry Cowen
- Anne Rabbitte
- Sylvester Barrett
- Mark Clinton
- Paul Connaughton Jnr
- Ciara Conway
- Rose Conway-Walsh
- Brendan Griffin
- Fidelma Healy Eames
- Jim Higgins
- Lorraine Higgins
- Seán Kyne
- Patrick Lindsay
- Farrell McElgunn
- Bobby Molloy
- Rónán Mullen
- Ronan Moore
- Carol Nolan
- Derek Nolan
- Maureen O'Carroll
- Pádraig Ó Céidigh
- Trevor Ó Clochartaigh
- John O'Mahony
- Pat Rabbitte
- Seán Sherlock
- Madeleine Taylor-Quinn
- Mary Upton
- Pat Upton
- John Dallat - SDLP politician
- Aisling Dolan

=== Government officials ===
- Henry Arthur Blake - Governor of Hong Kong (1898-1903)
- Antony MacDonnell, 1st Baron MacDonnell - Colonial Administrator
- Charles James O'Donnell - Colonial Administrator
- John Sheehy - Colonial Official
- William Alfred Browne - Civil servant

=== Diplomats ===
- Noel Dorr
- Pádraig MacKernan

=== Law ===
- John Atkinson
- Joseph R. Fisher
- Mark Heslin - judge of the High Court
- Likando Kalaluka - Attorney General of Zambia in 2015
- Walter Lewis
- Robert McCall
- John Monroe
- Thomas O'Shaughnessy
- Andrew Reed
- Guy Rutledge
- Mathilda Twomey - Chief Justice of the Supreme Court of Seychelles
- Raymond West - High Court Judge in British India
- Máire Whelan - Attorney General of Ireland, Judge of the Court of Appeal

=== Military ===
- Major General Michael Beary - UNIFIL Commander
- General Bindon Blood - British military commander
- Major General Kieran Brennan - Deputy Chief of Staff (Ops) and former Kilkenny hurler
- Lieutenant General Sean McCann - Former Chief of Staff of the Defence Forces
- Vice Admiral Mark Mellett - Chief of Staff of the Defence Forces
- Brigadier General Maureen O'Brien - First woman to attain the rank of Lt Colonel (Army Line), Colonel and Brig Gen in the Irish Defence Forces
- Commandant Cathal Berry - Former Deputy Commander of the Army Ranger Wing and Head of the Military Medical School

=== Religion ===
- Brendan Kelly - Bishop
- Fintan Monahan - Bishop
- George Thomas Stokes - Clergyman of the Church of Ireland and Historian
- Michael Lenihan O.F.M. - Bishop of La Ceiba, Honduras (2011-present)
- Robert Moore - Theologian
- Samuel Angus - Theologian
- William Mahony S.M.A. - Bishop of Ilorin, Nigeria
- Wilfrid Napier O.F.M. - Cardinal, Archbishop of Durban
- William Slattery O.F.M. - Archbishop of Pretoria

=== Literature ===
- Emily Anderson- Linguist
- Gerald Dawe - Poet
- James Hardiman - Librarian
- Mike McCormack - Writer
- Eamonn McGrath- Writer
- Ronan Moore - Writer
- W. F. Marshall - Poet
- Ailbhe Ní Ghearbhuigh - Poet
- Breandán Ó hEithir - Writer
- Valentine O'Hara

=== Academics ===
- William Bindon Blood - first professor of civil engineering at Queen's College Galway
- Alexander Anderson (physicist) - Physicist; former president of Queen's College and University College Galway
- J. E. Cairnes - Economist
- Louis Cullen - Professor of Irish History at Trinity College
- Edward Divers - Chemist
- Charles Joseph Gahan - Coleopterist
- John Hegarty - Provost of Trinity College Dublin
- Máire Herbert MRIA – Professor of Early and Medieval Irish at University College Cork
- Ethna Gaffney - scientist and first female professor at the Royal College of Surgeons in Ireland.
- Alfred Keogh - Director General Army Medical Services (1905-1910 and 1914-1918)
- Thomas J. Laffey - Mathematician known for his contributions to group theory and matrix theory.
- John A. McClelland - Physicist
- Mick Molloy - IRB medical officer
- Michael O'Shaughnessy - Chief engineer of San Francisco
- Alice Perry - First woman in Ireland to graduate with a degree in engineering

=== Media ===
- Patsy McGarry - Journalist
- Harry McGee - Journalist
- T. P. O'Connor
- Frank Hugh O'Donnell
- Conor Pope - Journalist
- Cillian Fennell - Former head of programming at TG4 and producer
- Pat McGrath - Correspondent
- Colm Murray - Sports-reader
- Siún Nic Gearailt - Television newsreader
- Eimear Ní Chonaola - Journalist and television news anchor
- Sean O'Rourke - Presenter
- Gráinne Seoige - Television news anchor

=== Arts ===
- Keith Barry - Performing artist
- Seán McGinley - Actor
- Nora-Jane Noone - Actress
- Martin Sheen - Actor
- Éabha McMahon - Singer
- Leo Moran - Guitarist
- John Coll - Figurative sculptor
- Pádraic Breathnach - Actor, first manager of Galway Arts Centre and co-founder of Macnas
- John Concannon - Director of "Ireland 2016" (official commemorations of the centenary of the Easter Rising)
- Garry Hynes - Co-founder Druid Theatre Company
- Mick Lally - Co-founder Druid Theatre Company
- Marie Mullen - Co-founder Druid Theatre Company
- Nicola Coughlan - Actress

=== Sports ===
- Enda Colleran - Gaelic football
- Iarfhlaith Davoren - Association football
- Daithí Burke - Hurling
- Niall Burke - Hurling
- Conor Cleary - Hurling
- Joe Connolly - Hurling
- Joseph Cooney - Hurling
- Anthony Cunningham - Hurling
- Cyril Farrell - Hurling
- Pat Fleury - Hurling
- Francis Forde - Hurling
- John Hanbury - Hurling
- Aidan Harte - Hurling
- Conor Hayes - Hurling
- Seán Loftus - Hurling
- Jeffrey Lynskey - Hurling
- Joe McDonagh - Dual player, Gaelic games administrator and 32nd President of the Gaelic Athletic Association
- Cathal Mannion - Hurling
- Pádraic Mannion - Hurling
- Conor Whelan - Hurling
- Cian Lynch - Hurling
- Eoghan Clifford - Paralympic cyclist
- Cormac Folan - Rower
- Paul Hession - Sprinter
- Olive Loughnane - Racewalker
- Neville Maxwell - Rower
- Ciaran Fitzgerald - Rugby union
- Fiona Everard - National champion runner

=== Business ===
- Nicky Hartery - Chairman of CRH plc
- John Hourican - Investment banker; former CEO of Bank of Cyprus
- Declan Kelly - Founding partner and co-CEO of Teneo
- Pádraig Ó Céidigh - Airline developer

== Faculty ==
- John Breslin - engineering professor and entrepreneur
- Nicholas Canny - historian and noted authority on early modern Ireland and Britain
- Ada English - psychiatrist
- Gerard Jennings - physics professor
- Thomas Kilroy - playwright, novelist, former Professor of English at the university
- William King - geologist
- Joseph Larmor - physicist, Professor at Queen's College Galway 1880-1885 and later Lucasian Professor of Mathematics at Cambridge
- Alexander Gordon Melville - comparative anatomist, Professor at Queen's College Galway 1849-1882
- George Johnstone Stoney - physicist who introduced the term electron as the "fundamental unit quantity of electricity"; first Professor of Science at the then new university; elder brother of Bindon Blood Stoney
- D'Arcy Wentworth Thompson - professor of Greek at UCG from 1862 and father of biologist Sir D'Arcy Wentworth Thompson
