= 27th Infantry Battalion (Ireland) =

- 27ú Cathlán Coisithe
- Unit flash of the 27th Infantry Battalion
- Active: 1 September 1973 – present
- Country: Ireland
- Branch: Army
- Type: Infantry
- Size: Battalion
- Part of: 2nd Brigade
- Headquarters: Aiken Barracks, Dundalk, County Louth
- Nickname: Border Bunnies
- Colours: Saffron & Purple
- March: Clare's Dragoons
- Anniversaries: 1 September

Commanders
- Notable commanders: Lt Gen Louis Hogan DSM (1973-1976); Lt Gen Dermot Earley DSM (1995-1997); Maj Gen Maureen O'Brien 2012

The 27th Infantry Battalion (27th Inf Bn; Irish: 27ú Cathlán Coisithe) is one of the seven infantry battalions of the Irish Army. The battalion was established on 1 September 1973 and forms part of the 2nd Brigade. The Battalion Headquarters is at Aiken Barracks, in Dundalk, County Louth.

== History ==
Following the outbreak of violence in Northern Ireland in 1969, known as The Troubles, the Irish Government sent soldiers to the border area. Initially, four company-sized infantry groups were formed to operate along the border; however, as the troubles escalated and with no end in sight it was decided to establish two infantry battalions as a permanent replacement for the border infantry groups. On 1 September 1973 the 27th Infantry Battalion and 28th Infantry Battalion were established.

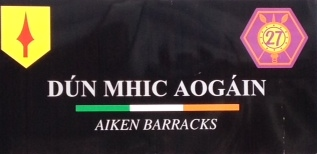
Battalion Crest at Aiken Barracks, Dundalk.

The 27th Infantry Battalion was formed from the personnel of 1 Infantry Group which had its HQ in Dundalk while 2 Infantry Group had its HQ in Cootehill, with each having a post in Castleblayney and Cavan respectively. From its activation, the battalion's headquarters, Headquarters Company, and A Company have been based in Dundalk. B Company was based in Gormanston, C Company in Cootehill and Support Company in Castleblaney. C Company was later disestablished. In 1998 B and SP Companies were based in Monaghan until they both moved to Dundalk in 2009. In 2012, B Company was based again in Gormanston before returning to Dundalk in 2025. In 2013, three reserve Companies were added to the Battalion's establishment: C Company – Cavan, D Company – Dundalk, and E Company – Navan.

The first officer commanding of the 27th Infantry Battalion was Lieutenant Colonel Louis Hogan. Hogan along with his second in command designed the battalion flash. The flash symbolism is based on the Irish mythological warrior Cúchulainn, given the relevance to the battalions area of operations and headquarters. The sword and two spears represent those presented to Cúchulainn by King Conchobar. The shape of the flash incorporates the angular sloped armour of the Panhard M3 armoured personnel carrier used by the battalion. The colours are saffron and purple. The saffron represents the colour of the cloaks worn by Irish mythical warriors the Fianna and purple is the traditional colour of infantry. The battalion marching tune is Clare's Dragoons, chosen by Louis Hogan who was originally from County Clare.

The 27th Infantry Battalion celebrated 40 years since its establishment with a parade in Dundalk town on 31 August 2013.

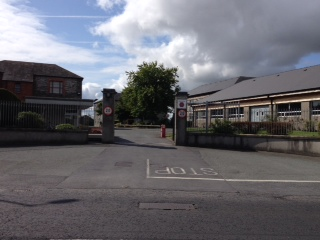
Main Entrance to the Battalion's Headquarters at Aiken Barracks, Dundalk.

=== Border and Aid To Civil Powers ===
Throughout the troubles, the 27th Infantry Battalion's largest commitment was providing checkpoints on border crossings in support to the Garda Síochána. Support to the Gardaí was known as Aid To Civil Powers (ATCP). Other ATCP tasks include escorting large sums of cash, industrial explosives and high-security prisoners as well as guarding Portlaoise Prison, Ireland's only high-security prison. In 1979 the battalion provided security at Killineer near Drogheda during Pope John Paul II visit to Ireland. In 2011 the battalion secured the Islandbridge area in Dublin during Queen Elizabeth II's state visit and the secured Dublin Airport for US president Barack Obama's visit a few days later. In 2015 soldiers from the battalion assisted Gardaí searching for Dundalk teenager Ciara Breen who went missing from her home in 1997.

=== Aid To Civil Authority ===
Another role carried out by the 27th Infantry Battalion is Aid To Civil Authority (ATCA). In 1978 and again in 1987 the battalion provided an emergency firefighting service when Dundalk Fire Brigade went on strike. In 2001 the Battalion was deployed to assist during the foot-and-mouth disease outbreak. In late 2010 during heavy snow and a deep freeze that lasted weeks the Battalion was deployed to assist in snow relief efforts, clearing snow throughout Dundalk and Drogheda town centres as well as transporting nurses to hospitals. In 2017 the Battalion was deployed to assist in supply water to Drogheda after the main water pipe supplying the town burst leaving the town without water for several days. In 2018 during snow-Storm Emma, the Battalion was deployed assisted in transporting patients and medical staff, clearing paths and generally assisting the emergency services. The battalion assisted the Health Service Executive during the COVID-19 pandemic in 2020.

=== Peacekeeping ===
Soldiers of the 27th Infantry Battalion have served in numerous Peacekeeping missions around the world, most notably in Lebanon since 1978 where three of the members of the Battalion died in service of peace, Private Patrick Wright in 1988, Private Michael McNeela in 1989 and Private Sean Rooney in 2022.

== Sub units ==
- Headquarter Company – Aiken Barracks, Dundalk
- A Company – Aiken Barracks, Dundalk
- B Company – Gormanston Camp
- Support Company – Aiken Barracks, Dundalk

Reserve Companies

- C Company – Cavan
- D Company – Dundalk
- E Company – Navan

== See also ==
- Killing of Seán Rooney
