= Naval Service Diving Section =

Diving unit of the Irish Naval Service

- Rannóg Tumadóireachta na Seirbháse Cabhlaigh
- Active: 1964–present
- Country: Ireland
- Branch: Irish Naval Service
- Type: Military diving
- Role: Maritime EOD; Maritime search and rescue Underwater engineering Underwater search and recovery
- Part of: Defence Forces
- Garrison/HQ: Haulbowline Naval Base, County Cork, Ireland

Insignia
- Abbreviation: NSDS

NSDS divers

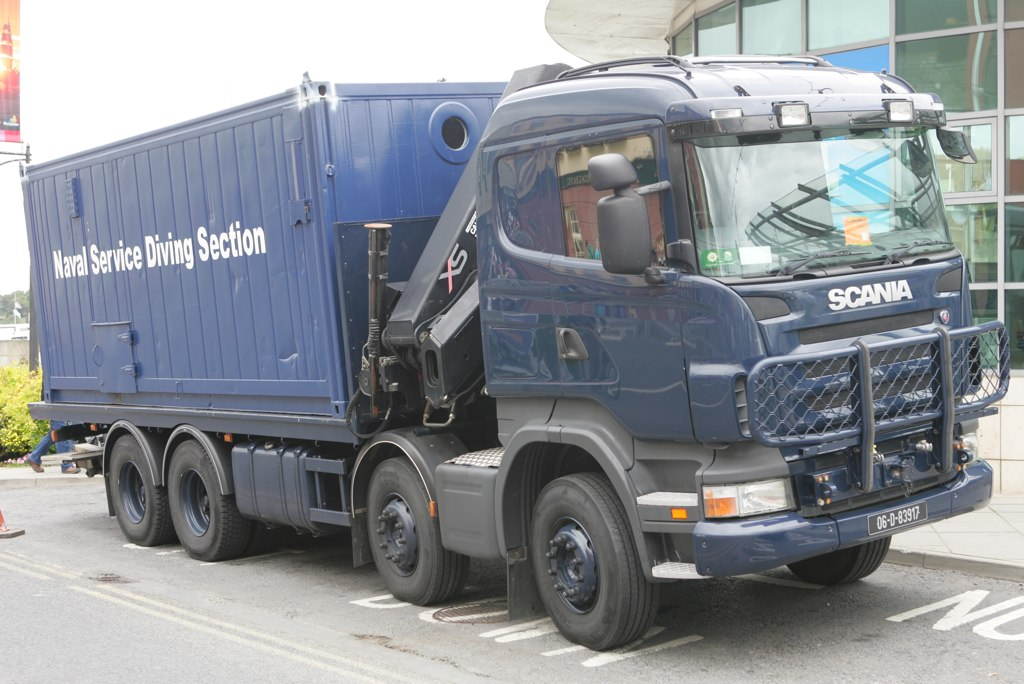
A NSDS support truck

The Naval Service Diving Section (NSDS) (Irish: Rannóg Tumadóireachta na Seirbháse Cabhlaigh) is a specialist unit of the Irish Naval Service, a branch of the Defence Forces, the military of Ireland. The Naval Service Diving Section specialises in underwater diving tasks for the Naval Service, and since its formation in the early 1960s has become Ireland's most advanced diving team, aiding other state agencies in various specialist roles.

== Roles ==
The main roles of the NSDS are:-

- Search and recovery
- Underwater survey
- Explosive ordnance disposal (EOD)
- Underwater engineering
- Military diving training

As of 2016, the NSDS was reportedly developing a Mine Counter Measures capability to protect sea lanes.

== Organisation ==
The Diving Section was officially established in 1964 when Commodore Joe Deasy (then a lieutenant) brought back skills he learned from the British Royal Navy to the Irish Naval Service. During the mid-1980s, the diver training course was set up at Haulbowline Naval Base, Cork Harbour, and since then over 1,400 Naval Service men and women have applied to join the elite unit, with just 150 succeeding (a pass rate of just 9.3%), all men. Each year around 50 Naval Service personnel apply to join the unit, roughly 15 of these are selected for the 11-week Naval Diving Course and on average just 5 complete it. The course is conducted during the winter months to prepare divers for the harshest conditions. Each diver needs to undertake 17 separate training courses to stay current on the section's equipment.

The NSDS operates a 24-hour on-call capability, ready to respond rapidly to any tasking around the state.

The NSDS is the only International Diving Schools Association (IDSA) accredited diving school in Ireland.

The Naval Service Diving Section provides specialised training and certification for the special operations unit of the Irish Defence Forces, responsible for the provision of air and combat diving technique training for the Army Ranger Wing (ARW) Combat Diving Section.

The NSDS conducts EOD and explosive ordnance reconnaissance (EOR) training alongside diving units of the Royal Navy and Royal Canadian Navy.

=== Domestic operations ===
In 1973, the NSDS was involved in its first high-profile operation during the interception of the Claudia, a vessel importing arms for the Provisional IRA.

In 1979, the section was tasked to assist during the Whiddy Island disaster, in which the oil tanker Betelgeuse exploded in Bantry Bay claiming the lives of 50 people.

In 1985, they were tasked with the search and recovery operation of Air India Flight 182, which came down off the south-west Irish coast in the deadliest terrorist bombing in aviation history, resulting in the deaths of 329 people. Two of the divers involved in that operation were awarded Distinguished Service Medals (DSM).

=== Overseas operations ===
NSDS teams have been involved in "Operation PONTUS" from 2015 onward, aboard Irish Naval Service vessels in the Mediterranean Sea as part of the European Union's humanitarian response to the European migrant crisis.

=== Known members ===
Vice Admiral Mark Mellett, chief of staff (2015-2021) of the Irish Defence Forces, is a former member of the NSDS.

== See also ==
- List of military diving units
- Garda Water Support Unit
