= Sean MacEoin (general) =

Irish military officer

- Born: 1910
- Died: 1998 (aged 87–88); Dublin
- Burial place: Rathfarnham
- Military career
- Allegiance: Ireland
- Branch: Irish Army
- Service years: 1930–1971
- Rank: Lieutenant general
- Commands: Chief of Staff; Force Commander, UNOC
- Conflicts: Congo Crisis
- Awards: DSM with Honour

Lieutenant General Sean MacEoin DSM (1910–1998), also known as John McKeown, was an officer in the Irish Defence Forces.

== Early life ==
MacEoin on was born in the Cooley Peninsula in County Louth.

== Military career ==
He joined the Irish Army as a cadet in 1930. He served as a battalion commander during The Emergency. After the war, he held appointments in an infantry and cadet school. He was appointed Commandant of the Irish Military College in 1957. In January 1960, he was appointed Chief of Staff of the Defence Forces. He was the first graduate of the Irish Military College to have the role.

In 1961, he was appointed as the Force Commander of the United Nations Operation in the Congo, which was considered a great honour for the Irish Defence Forces, he commanded it during some of the fiercest fighting of the Congo Crisis. He was in command of 20,000 troops of a number of different nationalities including Irish, Swedish, Indian, Ethiopian and Ghanaian. U Thant, the United Nations Secretary General said General MacEoin had "discharged his duties with eminence", and he was awarded the Distinguished Service Medal with Honour. On his return to Ireland, he took over his role as Chief of Staff of the Defence Forces, serving until his retirement in 1971.

== Death ==
MacEoin died at his home in Dublin in 1998, aged 88. The removal was from his residence to Good Shepherd Church, Churchtown, Dublin on 31 July, and the funeral Mass took place on 1 August, and he was buried at Bothar na Breinne, Rathfarnham. He had three sons and one daughter.

Military offices
Preceded by Patrick Mulcahy	Chief of Staff of the Defence Forces; January–December 1960	Succeeded by Sean Collins Powell
Preceded by Sean Collins Powell	Chief of Staff of the Defence Forces; 1962–1971	Succeeded by Patrick Delaney
