= General Hogan =

General Hogan may refer to:

- Daniel Hogan (general) (born 1895), Irish Army general
- Louis Hogan (1921–2001), Irish Defence Forces lieutenant general

== See also ==
- Attorney General Hogan (disambiguation)
