= Colm Mangan =

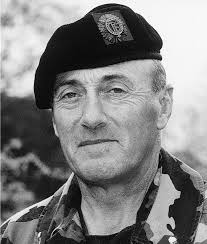
- Education: Rockwell College
- Military career
- Allegiance: Republic of Ireland
- Branch: Irish Army
- Service years: 1960-2004
- Rank: Lieutenant general
- Commands: Chief of Staff; Quartermaster-General; GOC Eastern Command; Commandant of the Military College
- Awards: DSM with Honour; Legion of Merit

Lieutenant General Colm Mangan DSM was an Irish army officer who served as Chief of Staff of the Irish Defence Forces.

Mangan joined the Defence Forces as a cadet in 1960, and commissioned into the Infantry Corps the following year. His senior appointments included Commandant of the Military College in 1995 and General Officer Commanding the Eastern Command in 1996 while a Brigadier General. In 1998, he was promoted to Major General and appointed Quartermaster-General. In 2000, he was promoted to Lieutenant General and appointed Chief of Staff. A fluent German speaker, he is a graduate of the Bundeswehr Command and Staff College in Hamburg. His overseas service included tours in Cyprus, Lebanon, and Yugoslavia. He retired from the Defence Forces in 2004.

Military offices
Preceded by David Stapleton	Chief of Staff of the Defence Forces; 2000-2004	Succeeded by James Sreenan
