= David Stapleton (general) =

Irish army officer

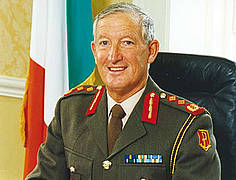
- Born: 26 September 1936; Clonmel, County Tipperary, Ireland
- Died: 13 June 2016; Newbridge, County Kildare, Ireland
- Military career
- Allegiance: Ireland
- Branch: Irish Army
- Service years: 1955 - 2000
- Rank: Lieutenant General
- Commands: Chief of Staff; Force Commander UNDOF; Quartermaster-General
- Awards: DSM with Honour

Lieutenant General David "Dave" Stapleton DSM (26 September 1937 - 13 June 2016), was an Irish army general officer who served as Chief of Staff of the Irish Defence Forces and previously as Force Commander of UNDOF in the Golan Heights.

== Early life ==
Stapleton was born in Clonmel, County Tipperary, Ireland on 26 September 1937, where he attended the local Christian Brothers school.

== Military career ==
He joined the Irish Defence Forces Cadet School in 1955 and was commissioned into the Supply and Transport Corps. During a forty five year long career he held the senior positions of Commander 6th Infantry Brigade, Director of the Transport Corps, Quartermaster General, Force Commander UNDOF and Chief of Staff. He was also a founding member and the first president of the Representative Association of Commissioned Officers.

== Personal life ==
He was married to Maureen and had four children. Stapleton died at his home in Newbridge on 13 June 2016.

Military offices
Preceded by Gerald McMahon	Chief of Staff of the Defence Forces; 1998-2000	Succeeded by Colm Mangan
