= General O'Brien =

General O'Brien may refer to:

- John O'Brien (Australian Army officer) (1908–1980), Australian Army major general
- John Thomond O'Brien (1786–1861), Irish-born Argentine Army officer
- Maureen O'Brien (Irish Army general) (born 1960), Irish Army major general

== See also ==
- Attorney General O'Brien (disambiguation)
