= Conor O'Boyle =

Conor O'Boyle DSM
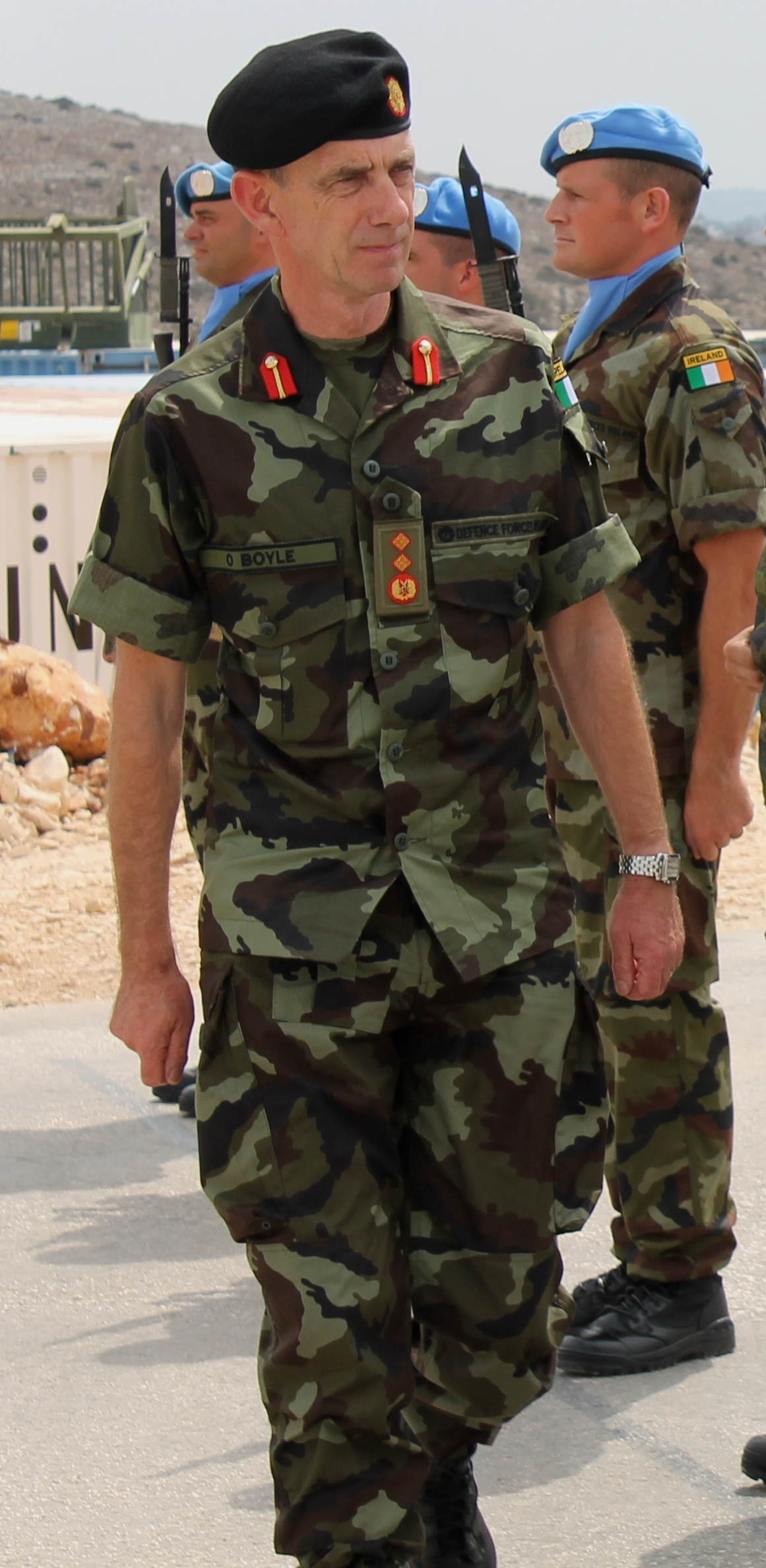
- Lieutenant General O'Boyle visiting the IRISHFINN Batt HQ, UNIFIL
- Military career
- Allegiance: Ireland
- Branch: Artillery Corps
- Service years: 1970-2015
- Rank: Lieutenant general
- Commands: Chief of Staff; Defence Forces Training Centre (DFTC)
- Conflicts: UNTSO; UNIFIL
- Awards: DSM with Honour; Service Medal; United Nations Peacekeepers Medal; United Nations Medal for UNTSO; United Nations Medal for UNIFIL

Lieutenant General Conor O'Boyle DSM was the Chief of Staff of the Irish Defence Forces from August 2013 until September 2015. O'Boyle was appointed to the post by the Government of Ireland on 12 August 2013. O'Boyle joined the Defence Forces in 1970 and was assigned to the Artillery Corps upon his commission in 1972. O'Boyle served in Middle East for two years with UNTSO and has been on three tours of duty with UNIFIL.

Lieutenant General O'Boyle retired in September 2015, and was succeeded by Rear Admiral Mark Mellett of the Irish Naval Service.

O'Boyle is married and has two children.

Military offices
Preceded by Sean McCann	Chief of Staff of the Defence Forces; 2013–2015	Succeeded by Mark Mellett
