= 2nd Brigade (Ireland) =

Brigade of the Irish Army

- Irish: 2ú Briogáid
- 2nd Brigade shoulder flash
- Country: Ireland
- Branch: Army
- Part of: Defence Forces
- Garrison/HQ: Cathal Brugha Barracks, Dublin
- Website: www.military.ie/en/who-we-are/army/2-brigade/

Commanders
- General Officer Commanding: Brigadier General Stephen Ryan

Insignia
- Flag

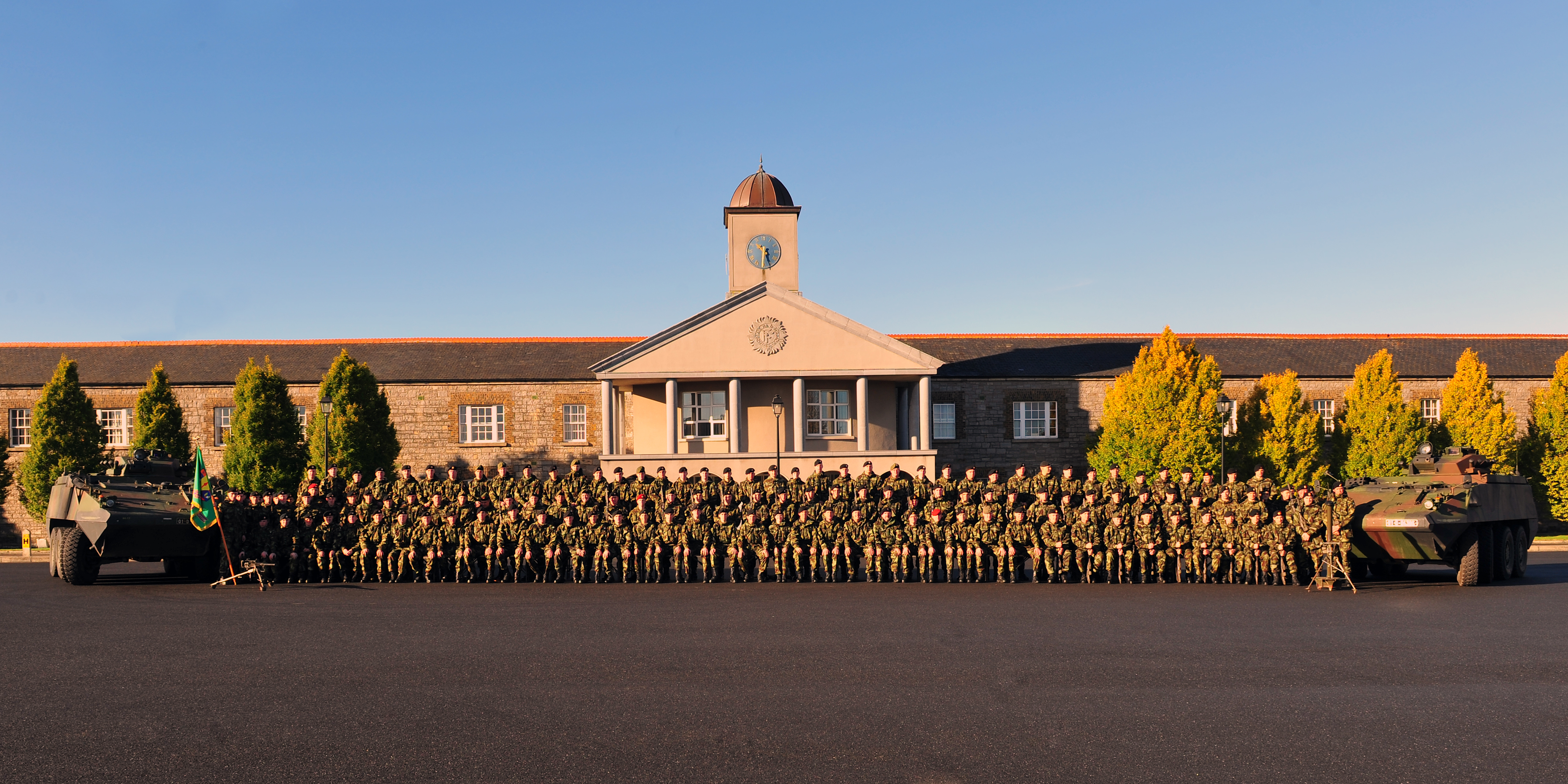
Cathal Brugha Barracks, home to the Irish Army's 2nd Brigade

The 2nd Brigade (2 BDE; Irish: 2ú Briogáid) (known as 2nd (Eastern) Brigade until the 2012 reorganisation of the army) is a brigade of the Irish Army. The brigade headquarters are in Cathal Brugha Barracks in Dublin.

2nd Brigade provides security to various vital installations in its area of responsibility, including; Government Buildings, Áras an Uachtaráin (Residence of the President), foreign embassies, Dublin Airport, Dublin Docks (Dublin Port, Dún Laoghaire) and Ireland West Airport.

== Units ==
- Brigade HQ - Cathal Brugha Barracks, Dublin
- 6 Infantry Battalion (Athlone)
- 7 Infantry Battalion (Dublin)
- 27 Infantry Battalion (Dundalk)
- 28 Infantry Battalion (Ballyshannon)
- 2 Artillery Regiment (Athlone)
- 2 Cavalry Squadron (Dublin)
- 2 Communication and Information Services Company (Dublin)
- 2 Engineer Group (Athlone)
- 2 Supply & Transport Group (Athlone)
- 2 Ordnance Group (Athlone)
- 2 Military Police Company (Dublin)

== Barracks ==
- McKee Barracks, Dublin 7
- St Bricins Hospital, Dublin
- Gormanston Camp in County Meath
- Aiken Barracks, Dundalk
- Custume Barracks, Athlone
- Finner Camp in Ballyshannon

== Training Facilities ==
- Gormanston Camp
- Kilbride Camp
- Glen of Imaal
