= James Sreenan =

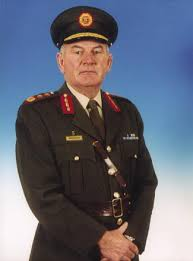
- Lt. General James Sreenan, Chief of Staff of Ireland's Defence Forces
- Born: Ballymote, County Sligo, Ireland
- Military career
- Allegiance: Irish Defence Forces
- Service years: 1963-2007
- Rank: Lt. General
- Commands: Chief of Staff of the Defence Forces
- Awards: Medal of the National Cedar

Lt. General James Sreenan is a former Chief of Staff of the Defence Forces.

A native of Ballymote, County Sligo, Sreenan was a member of the army from 1963 to 2007, serving initially with the 5th Infantry Battalion, as well as 8th Infantry Battalion and 20th Infantry Battalion FCA.

In 1963, Sreenan, along with the 37th Cadet Class of the Irish Defence Forces, performed a drill at the funeral of former president John F. Kennedy.

In 1970 he was appointed Assistant QuarterMaster of the 5th, and Company Commander in 1979. Prior to 1985, his assignments included Asst QM at McKee Barracks, Instructor at Military College, and Chief Instructor at Cadet School.

His overseas experience includes; Platoon Commander, UNFICYP, 1967; Military Observer, UNTSO, 1975; Battalion Commander 76 Inf Bn UNIFIL, 1994; Deputy Force Commander UNIFIL 1999–2000.

He moved to the Chief of Staff branch in 1985. He was appointed Deputy Chief of Staff Support (DCOS (Sp)) in February 2000 following three tours of duty in the Lebanon. He was appointed Chief of Staff of the Irish Defence Forces on 21 February 2004 to succeed Lt. General Colm Mangan.

Lt. General Sreenan announced his retirement from active duty in early 2007 and officially stood down from the office of Chief of Staff on 28 June 2007, to be succeeded by the then Major General Dermot Earley.

== See also ==
- FCÁ
- Irish Army website

Military offices
Preceded by Colm Mangan	Chief of Staff of the Defence Forces; 2004–2007	Succeeded by Dermot Earley
