= United States Army Command and General Staff College =

United States army graduate school

Coordinates: 39°20′39″N 94°54′57″W

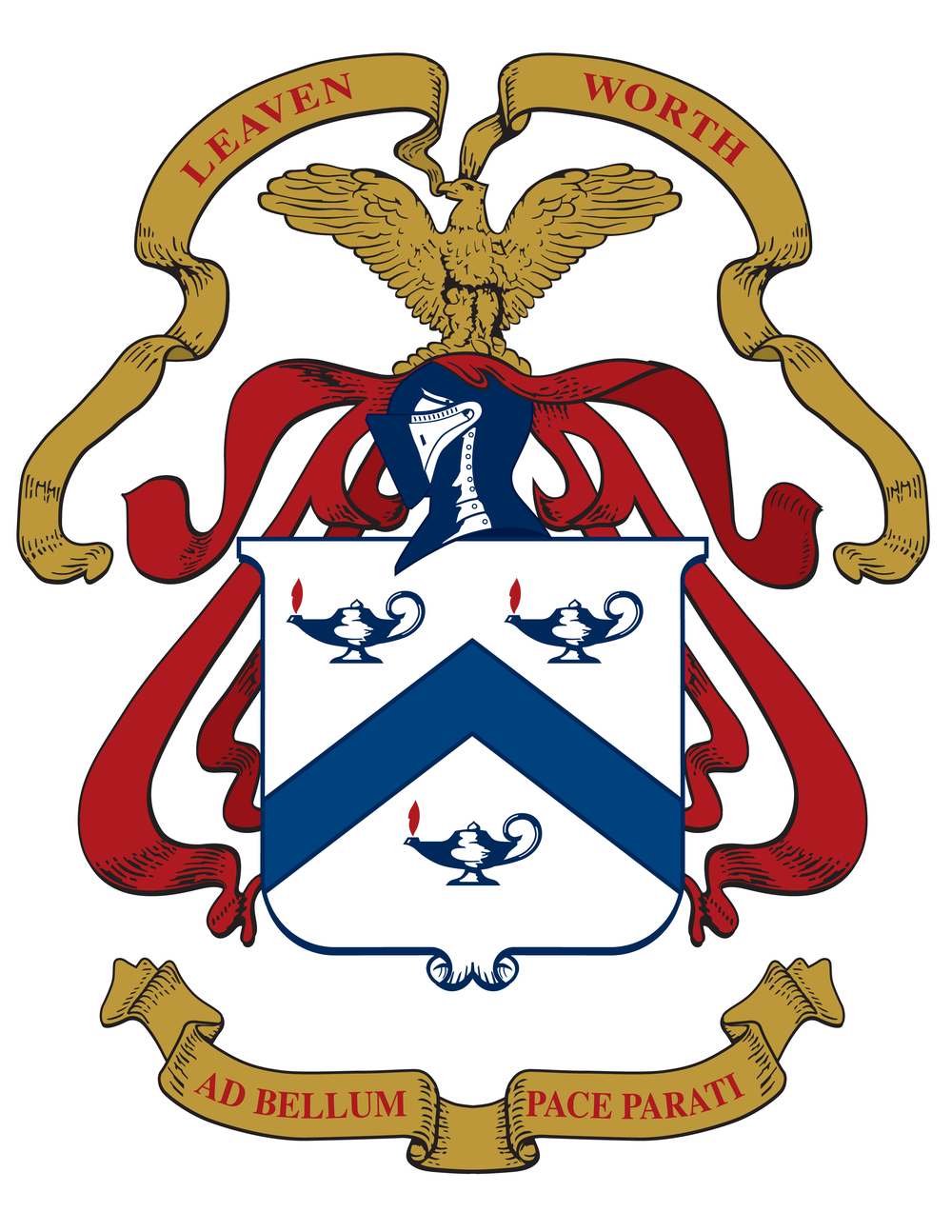
- Fort Leavenworth, U.S. Army Combined Arms Center, and U.S. Army Command and General Staff College Device
- Active: 1881–present
- Country: United States
- Branch: United States Army
- Garrison/HQ: Fort Leavenworth, Kansas
- Motto: Ad Bellum Pace Parati

Commanders
- Commandant: LTG James P. Isenhower III
- Deputy Commandant: COL Jason H. Rosenstrauch

The United States Army Command and General Staff College (CGSC or USACGSC) is a staff college for United States Army located at Fort Leavenworth, Kansas. The college was established in 1881 by William Tecumseh Sherman as the School of Application for Infantry and Cavalry (later simply the Infantry and Cavalry School), a training school for infantry and cavalry officers.

In 1907 it changed its title to the School of the Line. The curriculum expanded throughout World War I, World War II, the Korean War, and the Vietnam War and continues to adapt to include lessons learned from current conflicts. It provides professional military education to officers of the U.S. Army, as well as foreign military officers.

In addition to the main campus at Fort Leavenworth, the college has satellite campuses at Fort Belvoir, Virginia; Fort Lee, Virginia; Fort Gordon, Georgia; and Redstone Arsenal, Alabama. The college also maintains a distance-learning modality for some of its instruction.

== Mission statement ==
The United States Army Command and General Staff College (CGSC) educates, trains and develops leaders for Unified Land Operations in a joint, interagency, intergovernmental, and multinational operational environment; and to advance the art and science of the Profession of Arms in support of Army operational requirements.

== Schools ==
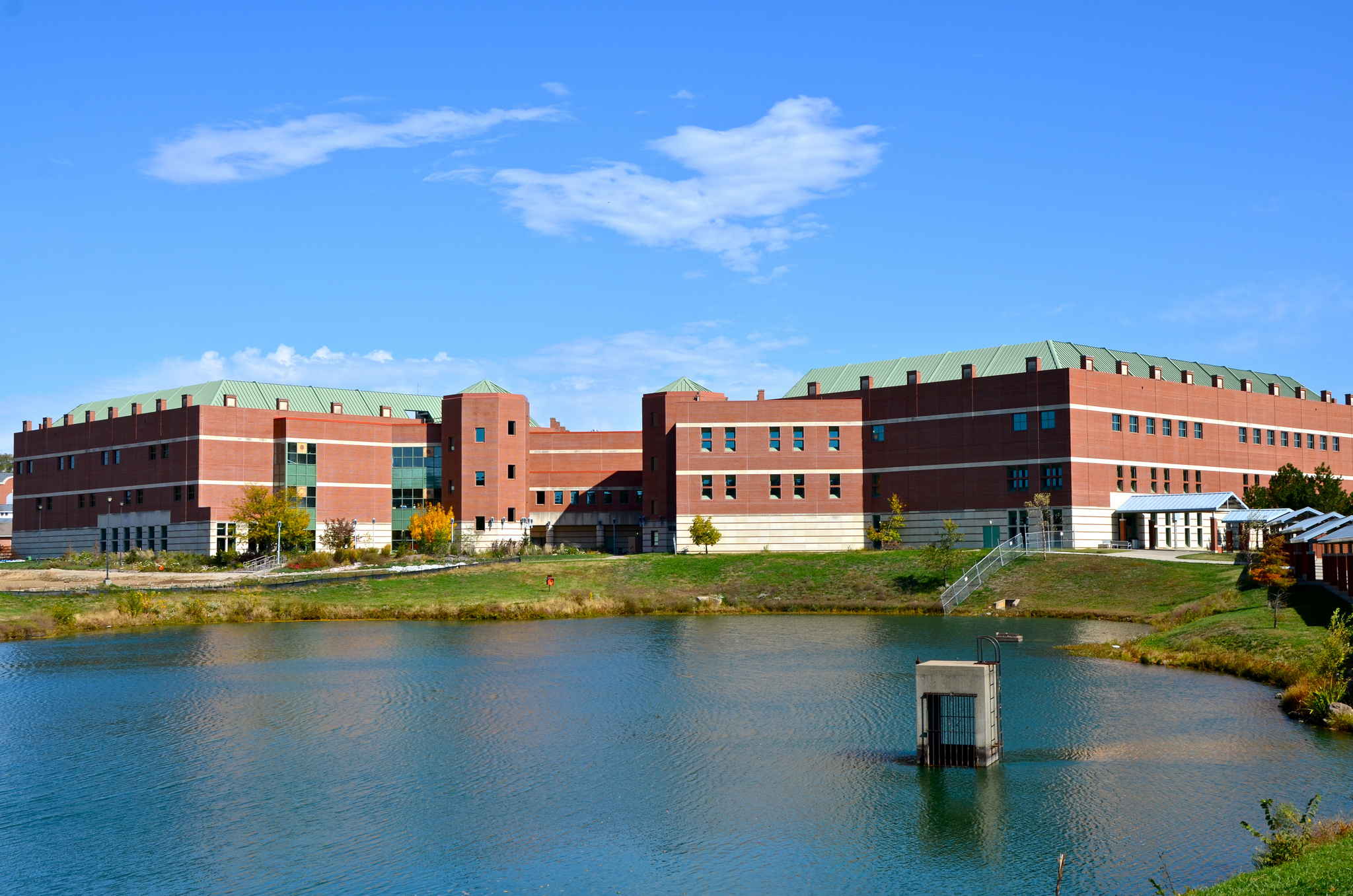
Fort Leavenworth's Eisenhower Hall houses the Combined Arms Research Library.

The college consists of four schools: the Command and General Staff School, the School of Advanced Military Studies, the School for Command Preparation, and the Sergeants Major Academy.

- Command and General Staff School (CGSS) delivers a ten-month Command and General Staff Officers Course (CGSOC) in residence at Fort Leavenworth, KS, to just over 1,200 U.S. military officers, international military officers, and interagency partners each academic year. Additionally, the School teaches CGSOC Common Core to 960 students at four satellite campuses, and the CGSOC Common Core and Advanced Operations Course (AOC) via distance learning (DL) to approximately 5,300 active and reserve component officers around the world. Resident CGSOC students are eligible to pursue the Masters of Operational Studies (MOS) or the Master of Military Art and Science (MMAS). Chapter 7 details CGSS delivery of CGSOC.

– The School of Professional Military Education at the Western Hemisphere Institute for Security Cooperation (WHINSEC) on Fort Benning, GA, offers the ten-month resident Command and General Staff Officer Course in Spanish to approximately 64 US and international officers each year. Since 2012, CGSOC students at SPME have been eligible to pursue the MMAS.

- School of Advanced Military Studies (SAMS) provides the Advanced Military Studies Program (AMSP) to 144 officers – most of whom just graduated from CGSOC – and the Advanced Strategic Leadership Studies Program (ASLSP) for 16 Senior Service College-select U.S. officers, international officers, and U.S. agency partners. All graduates of AMSP receive the Master of Arts in Military Operations, while graduates of ASLSP receive a Master of Arts in Strategic Studies. SAMS also manages the Army’s Advanced Strategic Planning and Policy Program (ASP3) within which Army officers pursue PhDs in international relations, public policy, economics, and history from leading universities in the U.S. and United Kingdom. There are currently 103 carefully selected senior Army strategic planners and future leaders in this program.
- School for Command Preparation (SCP) provides continuing education for future Army battalion and brigade commanders, command sergeants major, and spouses in ten 1-4 week courses offered multiple times during each academic year. SCP’s important mission and ten courses are characterized in Chapter 10.
- The Sergeants Major Academy (SGM-A) on Fort Bliss, TX, became CGSC's fourth school and a branch campus in March 2018. Each year, SGM-A offers the ten-month Sergeants Major Course-Resident (SMC-R) to 720 senior U.S. and international noncommissioned officers, and the SMC via distributed learning to another 1,320 mainly Army Reserve and National Guard NCOs around the world.

== Master of Military Art and Science degree ==
The Command and General Staff College confers a Master of Military Art and Science (MMAS) professional degree to graduates of the School of Advanced Military Studies as well as graduates of the Command and General Staff School who complete a thesis-level research paper. The degree is accredited by the Higher Learning Commission for collegiate institutions in the midwestern United States.

== Notable people ==
=== Notable alumni ===
- Creighton Abrams (1949)
- Clara Leach Adams-Ender (1976)
- Henry H. Arnold (1929)
- Lloyd J. Austin III
- Henry W. Baird (1923)
- Charles L. Bolte (1932)
- Omar Bradley (1929)
- Simon Bolivar Buckner Jr. (1928)
- Richard E. Cavazos (1960)
- Mark W. Clark (1935)
- Wesley Kanne Clark (1975)
- J. Lawton Collins (1933)
- William E. DePuy (1946)
- Jacob L. Devers (1925)
- Roger H.C. Donlon (1971)
- Robert L. Eichelberger (1929)
- Dwight D. Eisenhower (1925–26)
- James M. Gavin (1942)
- Andrew Goodpaster (1943)
- Stuart Heintzelman (1916)
- Lewis Blaine Hershey (1933)
- Courtney Hodges (1925)
- William M. Hoge (1928)
- Michelle J. Howard (1998)
- Clarence R. Huebner (1925)
- Harold Keith Johnson (1949)
- Robert Kingston (1960)
- John C. H. Lee (1918)
- Kirk Lippold (1994)
- Douglas MacArthur (1912)
- Raymond S. McLain (1938)
- George Marshall (1907)
- Troy H. Middleton (1924)
- Aubrey Newman (1943)
- Lunsford E. Oliver (1928)
- John McAuley Palmer (1910)
- George S. Patton Jr. (1924)
- David Petraeus (1983)
- Paul D. Phillips (1951)
- Colin Powell (1968)
- Elwood Richard Quesada (1937)
- Matthew Ridgway (1935)
- Bernard W. Rogers (1954)
- Lowell Ward Rooks (1935)
- Richard J. Seitz (1950)
- Peter J. Schoomaker (1982)
- H. Norman Schwarzkopf (1969)
- Clarence O. Sherrill (1906)
- Walter Bedell Smith (1935)
- Carl Andrew Spaatz (1936)
- Donn A. Starry (1960)
- Joseph Warren Stilwell (1926)
- Gordon R. Sullivan (1969)
- Loree K. Sutton
- Maxwell D. Taylor (1935)
- Maxwell R. Thurman (1967)
- Hoyt Vandenberg (1936)
- James Van Fleet (1918)
- Jonathan Mayhew Wainwright IV (1931)
- Albert Coady Wedemeyer (1936)

=== Notable foreign alumni ===
The college reports that 7,000 international students representing 155 countries have attended CGSC since 1894 and that more than 50 percent of CGSC International Military Student (IMS) graduates attain the rank of general.

- Brigadier Aslam Khan, Captured Kennedy Peak (Myanmar) in World War II and conquered Gilgit Baltistan, brother of Air Marshal Asghar Khan
- General Carlos Prats, Commander-in-Chief of the Army, Interior and Defense Minister, Vice President of the Republic of Chile.
- Prime Minister and General Kriangsak Chamanan of Thailand
- General Alfredo M. Santos of the Philippines
- Lieutenant General Rafael Ileto (former Secretary of the Department of National Defense) of the Philippines
- Prime Minister and General Tran Thien Khiem of South Vietnam
- General Do Cao Tri of South Vietnam
- General Hau Pei-tsun of the Republic of China (Taiwan)
- President Paul Kagame of Rwanda
- General Jennie Carignan of Canada
- General Katumba Wamala of Uganda
- General Demisse Bulto of Ethiopia
- General Muhoozi Kainerugaba, son of Ugandan president, he serves as chief of defence forces of Uganda
- General Yahya Khan of Pakistan
- General Muhammad Zia-ul-Haq of Pakistan
- General Rahimuddin Khan of Pakistan
- General Jehangir Karamat of Pakistan
- General Ashfaq Parvez Kayani of Pakistan
- General Eiji Kimizuka of Japan
- General Hisham Jaber of Lebanon
- General Krishnaswamy Sundarji of the Indian Army
- Brigadier-General Lee Hsien Loong of Singapore, 3rd Prime Minister of Singapore
- General Dieudonné Kayembe Mbandakulu of the Democratic Republic of the Congo
- President Gaafar Nimeiry of Sudan
- Lt. Colonel Anastasio Somoza Portocarrero of the Guardia Nacional de Nicaragua
- General Nguyễn Hợp Đoàn of South Vietnam
- General Nguyễn Khánh of South Vietnam
- General Phạm Văn Đổng of South Vietnam
- Ministry/Chief of Army General Staff and General Ahmad Yani of Indonesia
- President and General Susilo Bambang Yudhoyono of Indonesia
- General Veljko Kadijević of Yugoslavia
- General Antonio Domingo Bussi of Argentina
- General Moeen U Ahmed of Bangladesh
- General Amer Khammash of Jordan
- General Arne Dagfin Dahl of Norway
- General Gustav Hägglund of Finland
- General Avigdor Kahalani of Israel
- Lieutenant General David Tevzadze of Georgia
- Major General Vladimer Chachibaia of Georgia
- Colonel Nikoloz Janjgava of Georgia
- Général d'armée René Imbot, Chief of Staff of the French Army, General Director of DGSE, France
- King Hamad bin Isa Al Khalifa of Bahrain
- General Abdulkadir Sheikh Dini of Somalia
- Colonel Ahmed Mohammed Ali of Egypt
- President and General Humberto de Alencar Castelo Branco of Brazil
- Lieutenant General Sean McCann of Ireland
- General Mahesh Senanayake of Sri Lanka
- General Bipin Rawat of India, Chief of Defence Staff
- Lieutenant General Mykhailo Zabrodskyi of Ukraine
- Major General Andrus Merilo of Estonia
- Minister of Defense Ejup Maqedonci of Kosovo
- Lieutenant General Rossa Mulcahy of Ireland
- Coordinating Minister for Infrastructure and Regional Development Agus Harimurti Yudhoyono of Indonesia
- Minister of Transmigration Muhammad Iftitah Sulaiman Suryanagara of Indonesia
- Minister of Defense Geraldine George of Liberia

=== Notable faculty and deputy commandants ===
- Robert Arter (Deputy Commandant 1977–79)
- Richard E. Cavazos (faculty 1970–71)
- Roger H.C. Donlon (1978–81)
- Frederick M. Franks Jr. (Deputy commandant 1985–87)
- Glenn K. Otis Deputy Chief of Staff 1976–78
- Colin Powell Deputy Commanding General of the Combined Arms Combat Development Activity (1982–83)
- Lowell Ward Rooks (1933−1935)
- Gordon R. Sullivan Deputy Commandant 1987–88
- Adna R. Chaffee Jr. 1919–20
- Clarence R. Huebner (1929–33)
- Walter Krueger (1901–12)
- Lucian Truscott 1934–40

=== Commandants ===
Since 1976, the commandant of the college has been a lieutenant general. David Petraeus was the commandant between 2005 and 2007, immediately before going to command the Multi-National Force – Iraq.

== Photo gallery ==
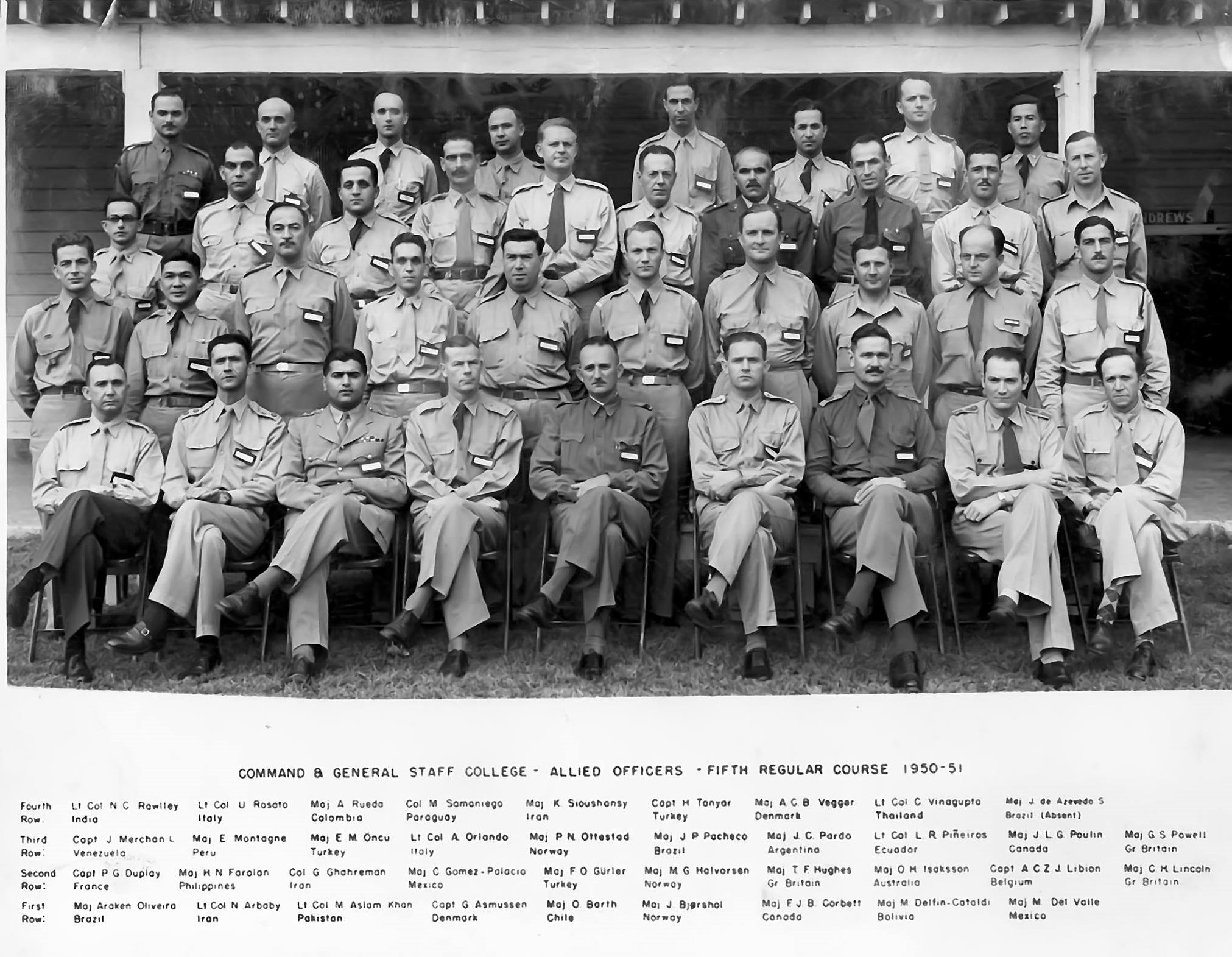
Students of the Fifth course 1950-51

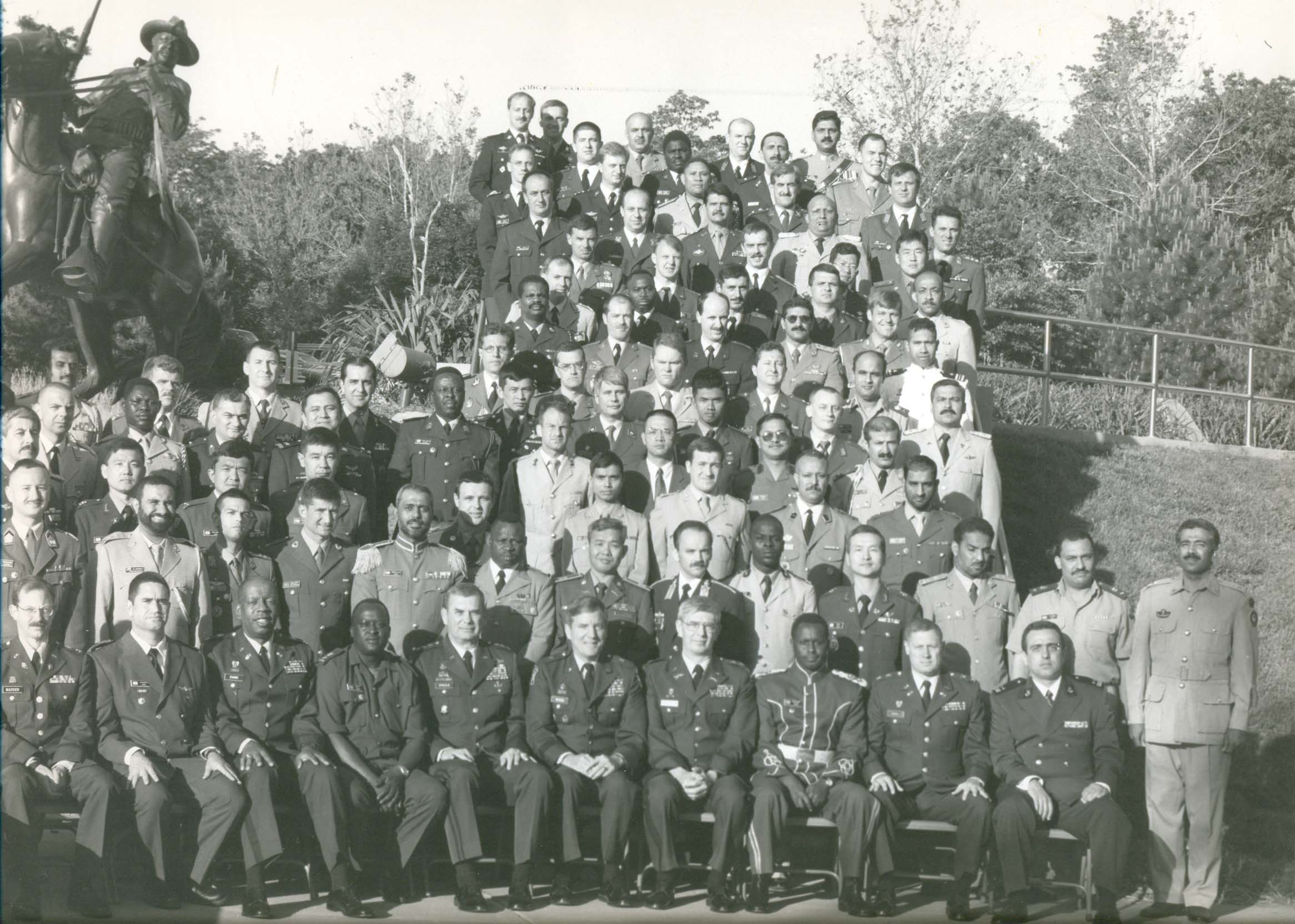
International Students of Class 1998–99

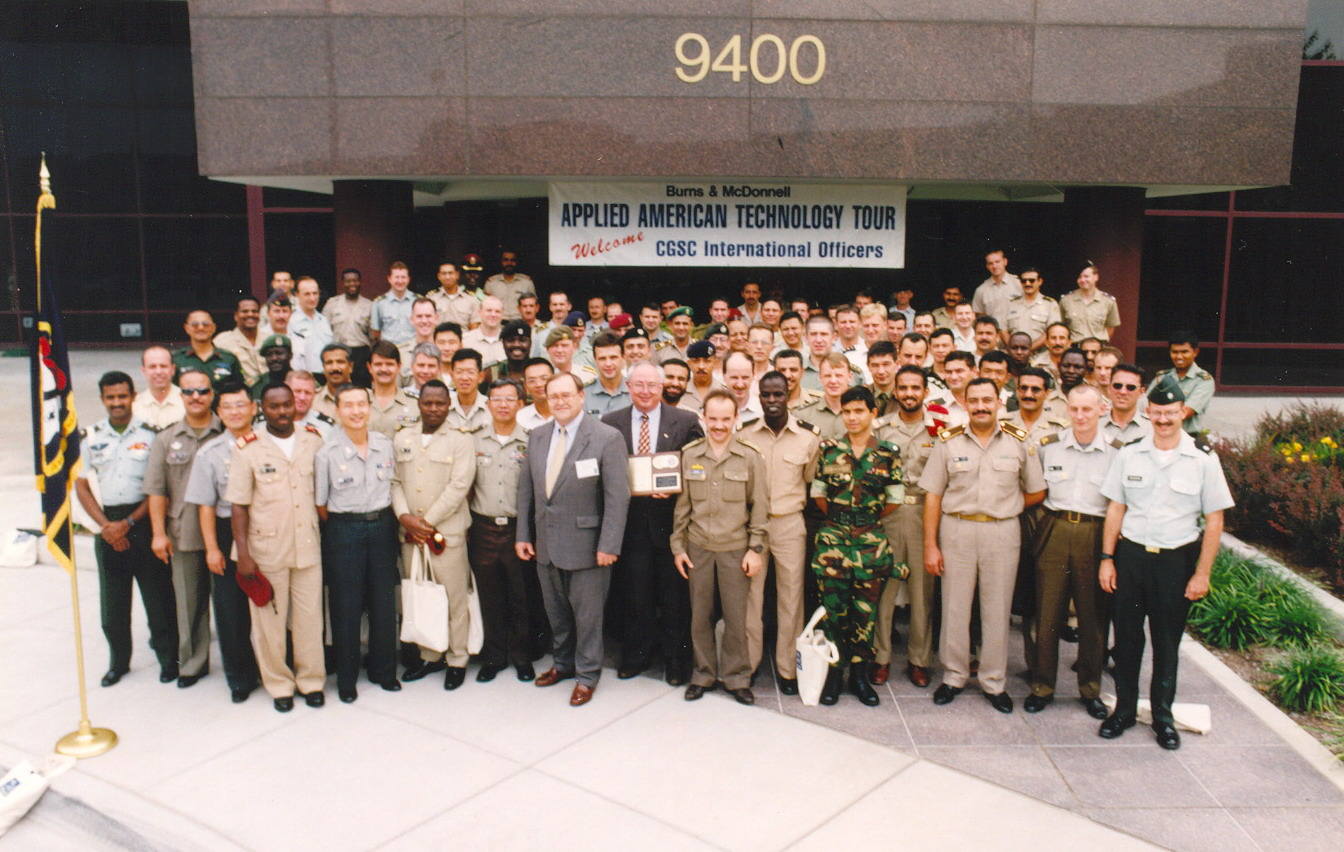
International Students of Class 1998–99 on a Kansas company visit

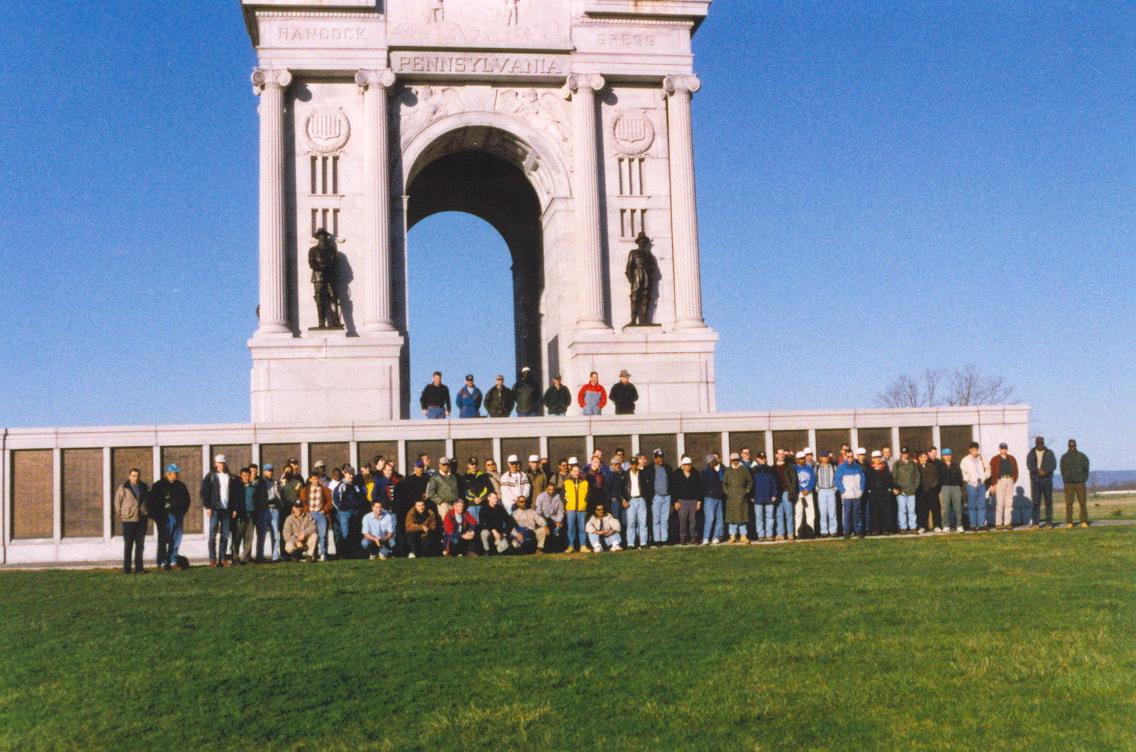
International Students of Class 1998–99 Gettysburg visit

== See also ==
- Battle command
- Air Command and Staff College
- Indonesian Army Command and General Staff College
