= Mark Mellett =

Irish Naval Service vice admiral

Vice Admiral Mark Mellett DSM
- Marcus Ó Méalóid
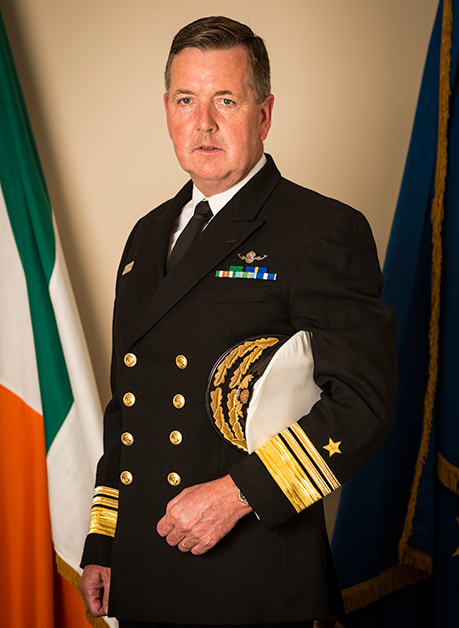
- Born: Mark Mellett; 4 November 1958 (age 67); Castlebar, County Mayo, Ireland
- Military career
- Allegiance: Ireland
- Branch: Army Reserve (former); Naval Service
- Service years: 1976–2021
- Rank: Vice Admiral (OF-8)
- Commands: Chief of Staff of the Defence Forces 2015-2021; Deputy Chief of Staff (Support) 2013; Flag Officer Commanding the Naval Service 2010; LÉ Eithne (P31) 2005; LÉ Ciara (P42) 1997; LÉ Orla (P41) 1991
- Conflicts: ISAF (Afghanistan) 2004; UNIFIL (Lebanon) 1989
- Awards: DSM with Honour; DSM with Distinction; Service Medal; UN Peacekeepers Medal; Centenary Medal; UN Medal for UNIFIL; NATO Medal for ISAF

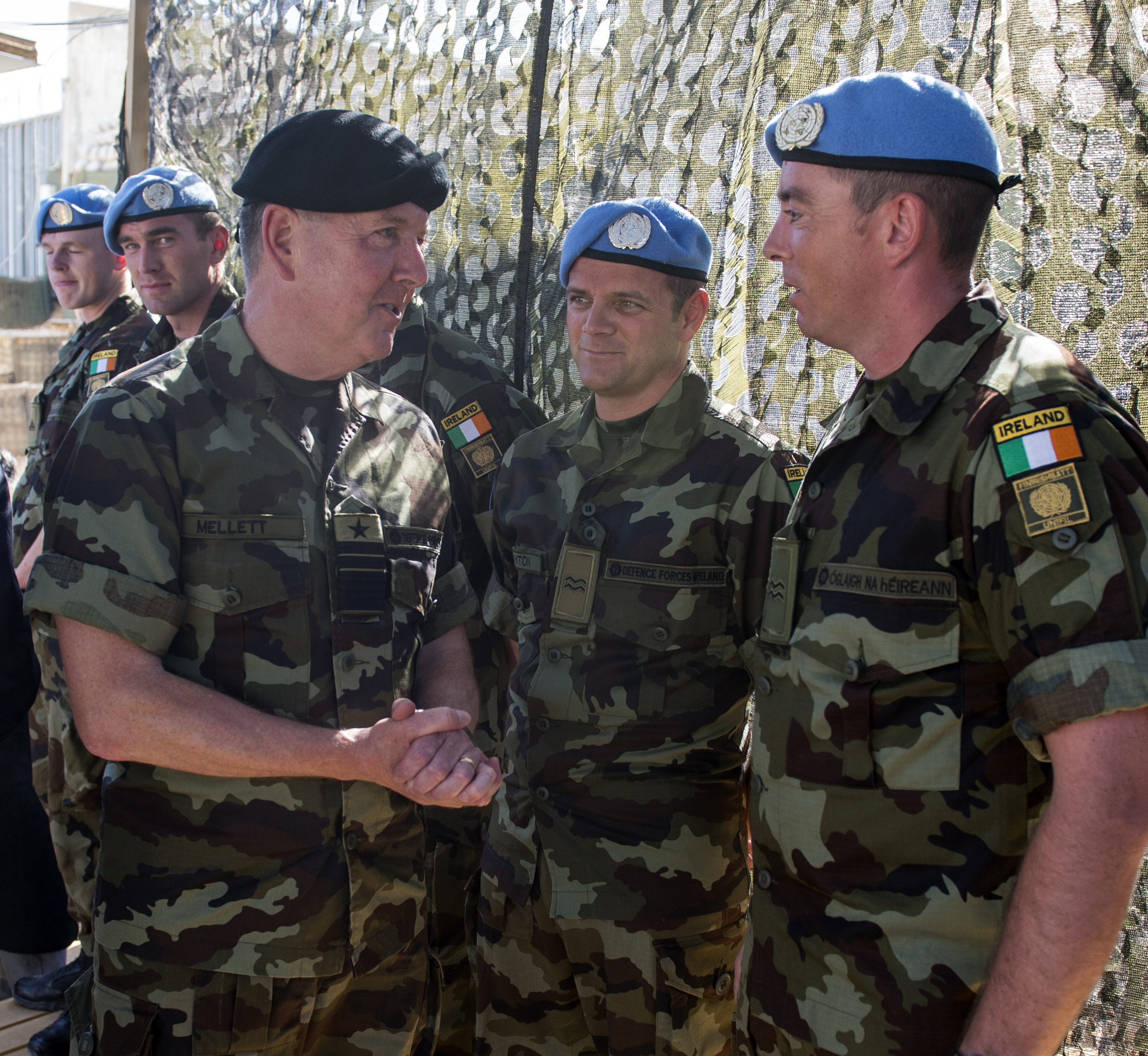
Vice Admiral Mellett (left) visiting Irish troops deployed in Lebanon as part of UNIFIL

Vice Admiral Mark Mellett, DSM (Irish: Marcus Ó Méalóid; born 4 November 1958), is a retired Irish Naval Service vice admiral and was Chief of Staff of Ireland's Defence Forces from September 2015 until September 2021.

== Military career ==
Mark Mellett is from Castlebar, County Mayo, and joined the Irish Naval Service in November 1976 having served in the then FCÁ (Army Reserve), 5th Motor Sqn (modern-day Cavalry Corps), before being appointed as a Commissioned Officer after a two-year cadetship where he studied at the Cadet School Military College in the Curragh Camp, County Kildare, Cadet School Naval College Haulbowline, Cork in Ireland, and at Britannia Royal Naval College in Dartmouth, England.

His first command was of the LÉ Orla in 1991, he subsequently commanded the LÉ Ciara in 1997 before commanding the Irish Naval Service flagship, LÉ Eithne, in 2005. He became the second Naval Service officer recipient of the Distinguished Service Medal (DSM) in 1994 as Captain of the LÉ Orla for its role in the detention of drug smuggling craft.

Mellett is a qualified navy diver and former member of the specialist Naval Service Diving Section (NSDS).

Mellett served overseas with the Irish Defence Forces as part of the United Nations Interim Force in Lebanon (UNIFIL) in 1989, and with the International Security Assistance Force (ISAF) in Afghanistan in 2004 as a senior North Atlantic Treaty Organization (NATO) Information Operations Officer, where he was credited as being a major player in the success of the 2004 Afghan presidential election – where Hamid Karzai was elected into office – using his diplomacy skills in bringing together the numerous official bodies entrusted with running the democratic elections. He received citations for his service in both Lebanon and Afghanistan.

Mellett has served as Commandant of the Naval College and Associate Head of the National Maritime College of Ireland (NMCI).

Mellett was the Officer Commanding Naval Operations Command (OCNOC) at Naval Headquarters, Haulbowline Naval Base, Cork Harbour prior to his appointment as Flag Officer Commanding the Naval Service (FOCNS) in January 2011, holding the rank of Commodore. As flag officer, his vision was to transform the Irish Naval Service into the "smartest, most innovative and responsive" navy in the world.

In November 2013, Mellett was announced as Deputy Chief of Staff, Support (D COS Sp) at Defence Forces Headquarters by the Department of Defence, promoted to the rank of Rear admiral, and becoming the highest ranking Naval Service officer in the history of the state at the time.

On 29 September 2015, Mellett took over from Lieutenant general Conor O'Boyle (Irish Army) as Chief of Staff of the Defence Forces when Lt Gen O'Boyle retired. Mellett was nominated for the position by Minister for Defence Simon Coveney, approved by the Irish government and appointed by the President of Ireland, who is the Supreme Commander of the Defence Forces. Mellett made Irish military history in becoming the first Defence Forces Chief of Staff from outside the branch of the Army, promoted to the rank of Vice admiral, the naval equivalent of an Irish Army Lieutenant general.

Mellett retired from the Defence Forces in September 2021, with Seán Clancy taking over as Chief of Staff.

== Education ==
Mellett holds a PhD (2009) in Political Science in Governance from NUI Galway and a Master of Commerce (2002) in Government and Public Policy (Honours) from University College Cork (UCC). He is a distinguished graduate of the United States Naval War College, Newport, Rhode Island (1999), where he was the top graduate of the thirty two attending countries. He was also the top graduate in both the Irish Command and Staff College (1998) and the Royal Naval College, Greenwich (1989).

Mellett is a Fellow of the Nautical Institute (FNI). He has been a visiting professor at the Centre for Applied Research in Security Innovation (CASI) at Liverpool Hope University, and has published in the areas of security, innovation and governance. Mellett is a published research member of the European Security Research Innovation Forum (ESRIF).

He is a founding member of the Irish Maritime and Energy Resource Cluster (IMERC), an institutional cluster encompassing University College Cork and Cork Institute of Technology (CIT). The aim of IMERC is to enhance Defence Forces capability while facilitating innovation, transformation and job creation in the private sector.

Mellett was appointed as an adjunct professor of law at University College Cork (UCC).

== Personal life ==
Mellett is married with four children. He is said to be interested in physical fitness, including running, cycling and gym work.

== Ranks held ==
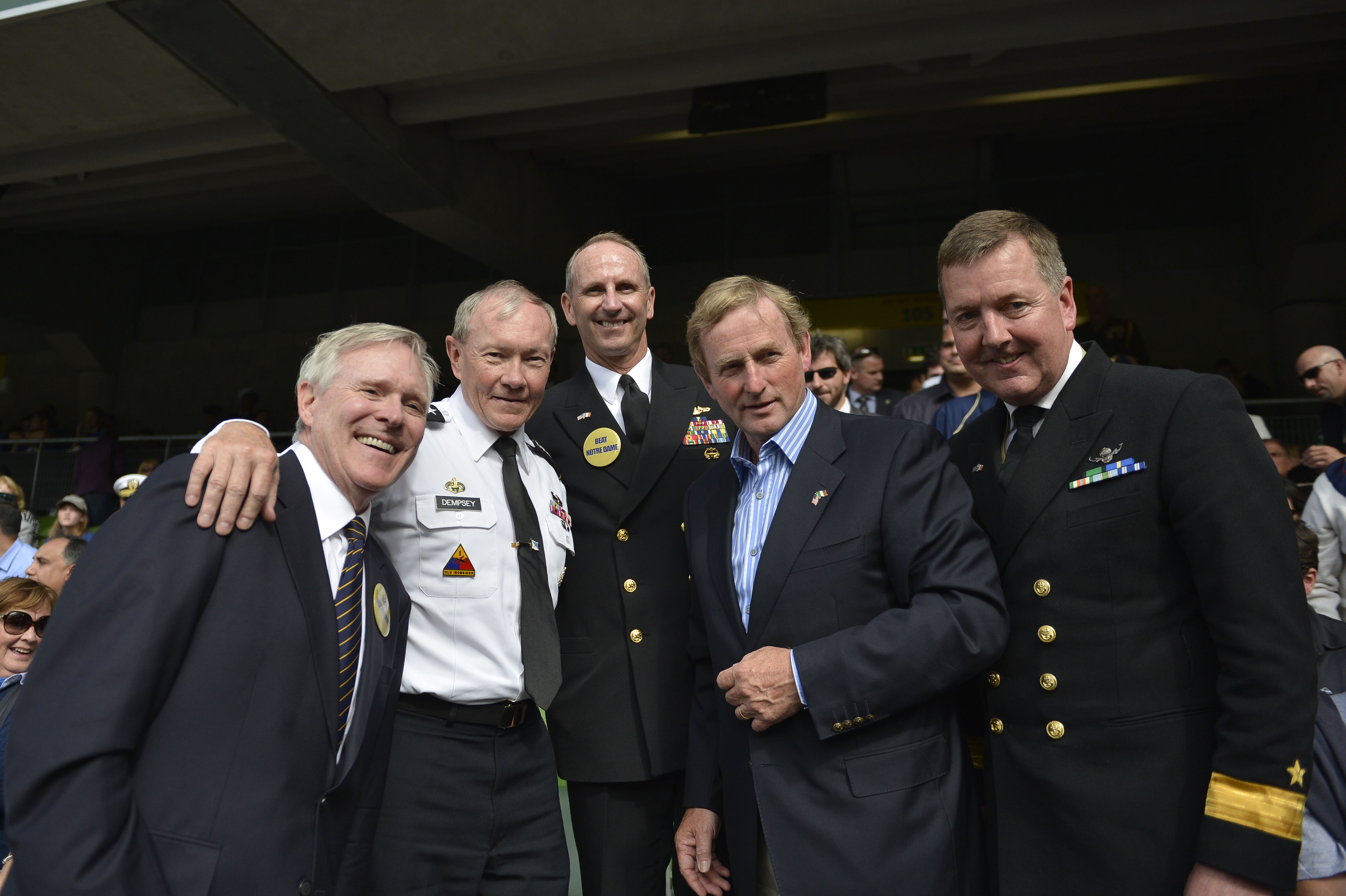
US SECNAV Ray Mabus, US Chairman of the Joint Chiefs Gen. Martin Dempsey, US Chief of Naval Operations Adm. Jonathan Greenert and Taoiseach Enda Kenny with VADM Mark Mellett

Rank	Position	Date
Officer cadet		December 1976
Ensign		
Sub-lieutenant		
Lieutenant		
Lieutenant commander	LÉ Orla 1991; LÉ Ciara 1997	
Commander	LÉ Eithne 2005	
Captain		
Commodore	Flag Officer Commanding the Naval Service (FOCNS)	25 January 2011
Rear admiral	Deputy Chief of Staff, Support (D COS Sp); Defence Forces Headquarters	5 November 2013
Vice Admiral	Chief of Staff of Defence Forces Ireland	29 September 2015

== Decorations ==
Naval Service Diving Officer
Distinguished Service Medal (DSM) with Distinction
Service Medal (20 years service)
United Nations Peacekeepers Medal
1916 Centenary Commemorative Medal
United Nations Medal for UNIFIL
NATO Non-Article 5 Medal for ISAF

Military offices
Preceded by Conor O'Boyle	Chief of Staff of the Defence Forces; 2015–2021	Succeeded by Seán Clancy
