= Attorney General O'Brien =

Attorney General O'Brien may refer to:

- Denis O'Brien (politician) (1837–1909), Attorney General of New York
- Ignatius O'Brien, 1st Baron Shandon (1857–1930), Attorney General for Ireland
- Peter O'Brien, 1st Baron O'Brien (1842–1914), Attorney General for Ireland

== See also ==
- General O'Brien (disambiguation)
