= Seán Clancy (Irish general) =

Irish general

General Seán Clancy
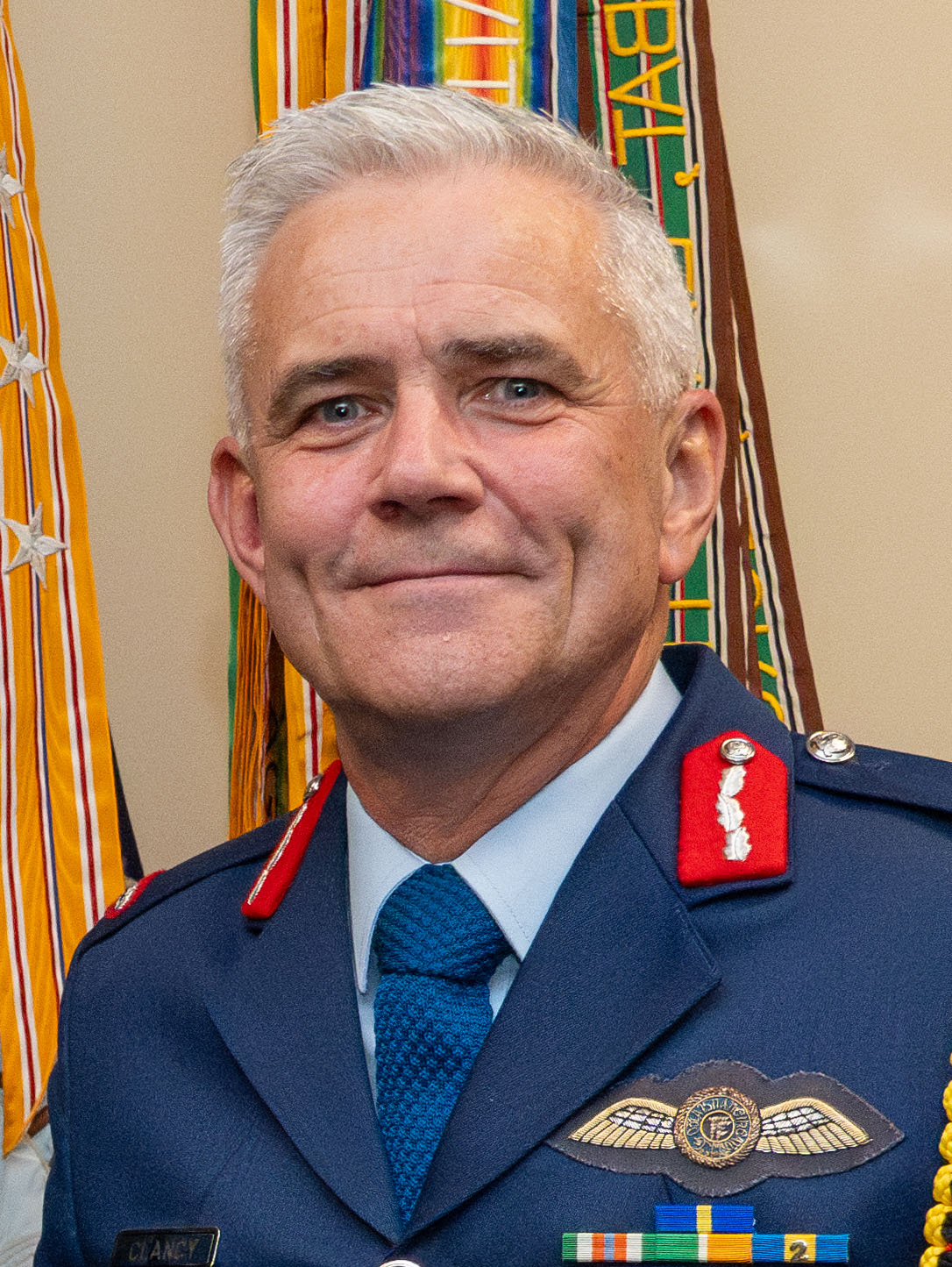
- Clancy in 2024
- Born: 3 June 1966 (age 60); Mitchelstown, Cork, Ireland
- Military career
- Allegiance: Ireland
- Branch: Irish Air Corps
- Service years: 1984–present
- Rank: General
- Commands: Chief of Staff; Deputy Chief of Staff (Support); Chief of Air Staff; Director of Strategic Planning
- Awards: Service Medal; United Nations Peacekeepers Medal; 1916 Centenary Commemorative Medal

General Seán Clancy (born 3 June 1966) is an Irish Air Corps general and current Chairman of the European Union Military Committee (CEUMC) since 1 June 2025 with the rank of general. Previously he served as the Chief of Staff of the Irish Defence Forces since 29 September 2021.

Clancy spent 16 years of his military career as a search and rescue (SAR) pilot for the Irish Air Corps, before moving up the chain of command as Chief of Air Staff (GOC Air Corps) and Defence Forces Headquarters appointments such as Director of Strategic Planning and Deputy Chief of Staff (Support). Clancy has also spent a number of years on overseas deployments with the EU and UN. He was the first Chief of Staff from the Air Corps branch.

== Early life ==
Clancy is a native of Mitchelstown in County Cork and grew up partaking in scouting, progressing to become a patrol leader in the 30th Cork Scout Troop, competing for the Melvin Cup (an all-Ireland scouting competition). His father Seán 'Jack' Clancy (a native of Kilrush, County Clare) was principal of the primary school he attended, and he attended Christian Brothers Secondary School in Mitchelstown for three years, before moving to St Flannan's College in Ennis to complete the Leaving Certificate.

== Military career ==
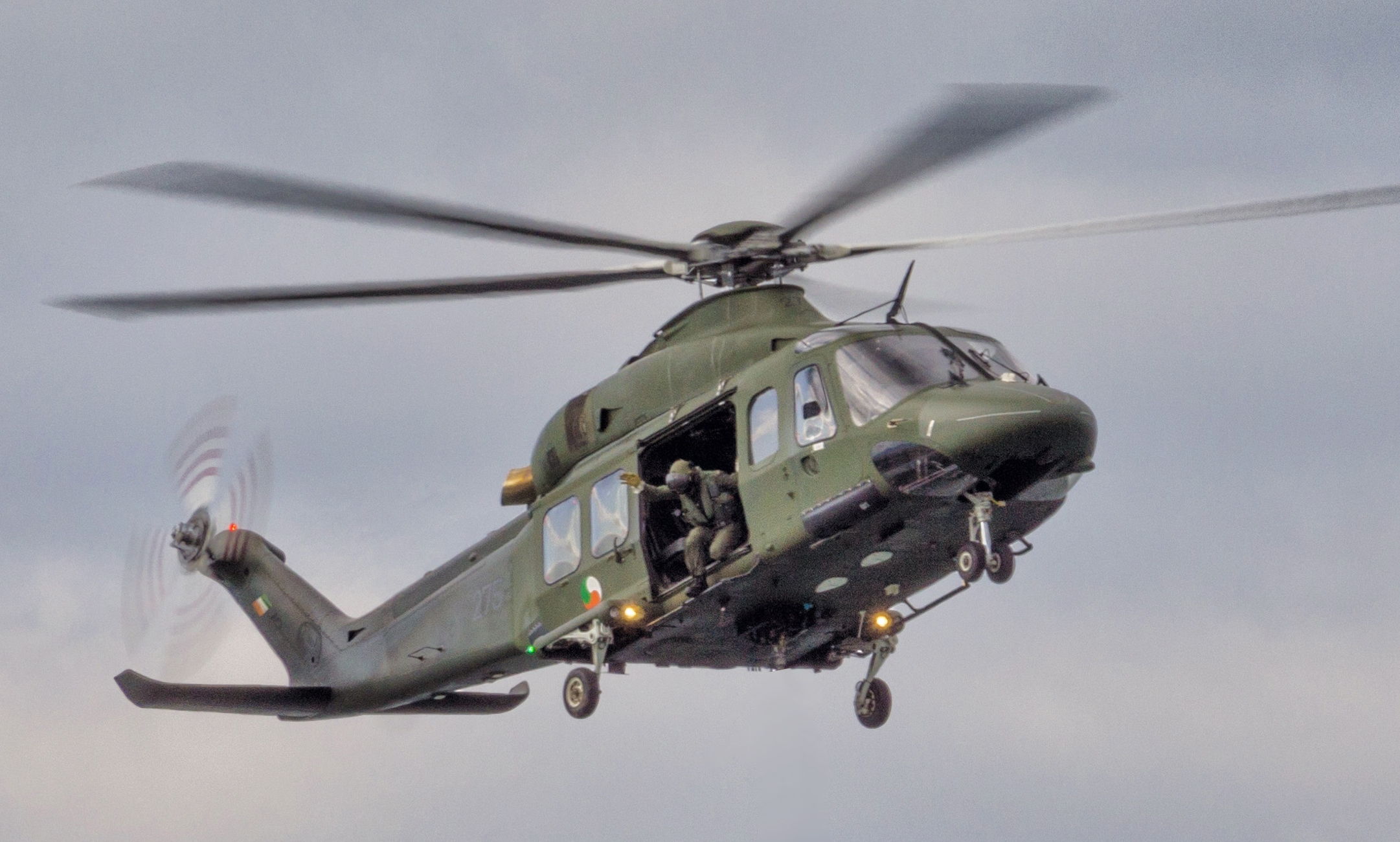
Clancy holds a number of ratings on the AW139

Clancy joined the Defence Forces as an Air Corps cadet in 1984, and began flight training in 1986. He was trained on and has flown both fixed and rotary wing aircraft, clocking up 5,000 flight hours. He is a qualified type and instrument-rating examiner, qualified flight simulator instructor and has held type, instrument and NVG ratings on the AgustaWestland AW139 helicopter.

As a search and rescue pilot, Clancy was commander of a crew who received the Marine Medal for Meritorious Service in 2002.

Clancy has served in both Air Corps and tri-service Defence Forces Headquarters (DFHQ) appointments including as Squadron Commander, Wing Commander, Senior Staff Officer Operations, Senior Staff Officer Personnel, Chief of Air Staff Support in Air Corps Headquarters and Director of Strategic Planning Branch (Chief of Staff's Branch, DFHQ). In 2017, he was appointed as General Officer Commanding (GOC) of the Irish Air Corps and Director of Military Aviation (DFHQ).

He is credited with playing a central role in the establishment of Ireland's first Emergency Aeromedical Service in 2012.

Clancy served as military advisor to the Force Commander of the European Union Force Bosnia and Herzegovina (EUFOR/"Operation Althea"), and spent two years as air advisor to SHIRBRIG, the UN standby brigade.

Prior to promotion to Chief of Staff, he served as Deputy Chief of Staff (Support) in DF Headquarters, responsible for logistics, human resources, transport, engineering, ordnance, medical and military policing across the three service branches of the Defence Forces.

Clancy became the first Air Corps officer to be appointed as Chief of Staff by the government, and the second from outside the Irish Army (his predecessor Vice Admiral Mark Mellett was from the Naval Service).

In May 2024 Clancy was announced as the next head of the European Union Military Committee with the rank of four star general.

== Education ==
Clancy holds a Bachelor of Science (Hons) Degree in Computer Science from Trinity College Dublin and a Masters in Military Leadership and Defence Studies from Maynooth University. He graduated from the Defence Forces Command and Staff College with the Lt Gen Tadgh O'Neill Award (for best student of combined military and MA components).

Clancy co-authored the Defence Forces Leadership Doctrine published in 2016.

Military offices
Preceded by Robert Brieger	Chairman of the EU Military Committee; 2025–present	Incumbent
Preceded by Mark Mellett	Chief of Staff of the Defence Forces of Ireland; 2021–2025	Succeeded by Rossa Mulcahy
