= Attorney General Hogan =

Attorney General Hogan may refer to:

- Michael Joseph Hogan (1908–1986), Attorney General of Malaya
- Timothy Sylvester Hogan (politician) (1864–1926), Attorney General of Ohio

== See also ==
- General Hogan (disambiguation)
