= Rossa Mulcahy =

Irish general

Lieutenant General Rossa Mulcahy
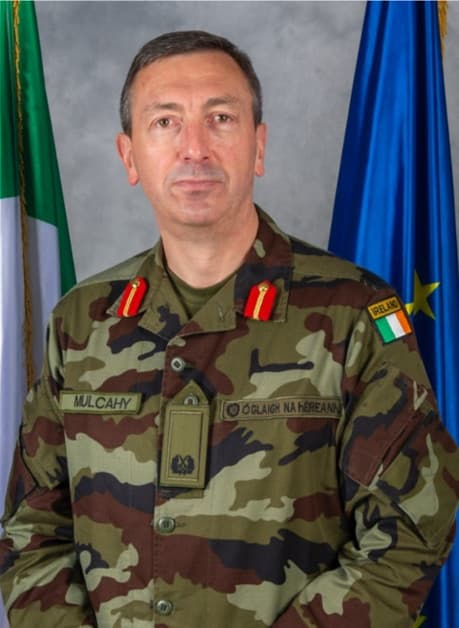
- Born: Newbridge, County Kildare, Ireland
- Military career
- Allegiance: Ireland
- Branch: CIS Corps
- Service years: 1986–present
- Rank: Lieutenant General
- Commands: Chief of Staff; Assistant Chief of Staff; Director of Strategic Planning; Director of CIS Corps

Lieutenant General Rossa Mulcahy is an Irish Army general and current Chief of Staff of the Irish Defence Forces since 1 June 2025.

== Education ==
Mulcahy holds a Bachelor of Commerce from the University of Galway, a Higher Diploma in Information Technology from Maynooth University, a Bachelor of Science in Management Information Systems from University College Dublin (UCD), a Master of Arts degree in Leadership, Management and Defence Studies from Maynooth University and a Professional Diploma in Strategy Development and Innovation from the Michael Smurfit Graduate Business School, UCD.

Mulcahy is a graduate of the Defence Forces Senior Command & Staff Course in 2008 and the United States Army Command and General Staff College in 2011.

== Irish Army ==
Mulcahy joined the Irish Army as a Cadet in 1986 and is a professional communications officer, having served in all CIS units of the Irish Army.

Mulcahy has held appointments in the Joint Command and Staff School and the Defence Forces Management Information Framework Section. From 2019, Mulcahy served as Director of CIS, where he was responsible for cyber in the Defence Forces. From February 2020 he served as Director of Strategic Planning Branch, with responsibility for strategy development, defence policy implementation, annual plans, and international security and defence policy coordination.

In October 2021, Mulcahy was promoted to Brigadier General and appointed Assistant Chief of Staff, responsible for organisation transformation, capability development, innovation, risk management, corporate governance, and industrial relations, doctrine and cultural transformation.

== Overseas service ==
Mulcahy has overseas service with three deployments to UNIFIL in Lebanon, two years deployment to Syria and Lebanon with UNTSO and a deployment as Irish National Senior and Deputy Key Leader Engagement (KLE) Branch at NATO's Resolute Support Mission, in Kabul, Afghanistan.

Military offices
Preceded by Seán Clancy	Chief of Staff of the Defence Forces; 2025–present	Incumbent
