= Dermot Earley Snr =

Gaelic football player, manager and Irish general (1948–2010)

Dermot Earley DSM
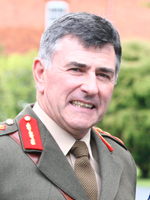
- Born: 24 February 1948; Castlebar, County Mayo
- Died: 23 June 2010 (aged 62); Drogheda Memorial Hospital, Curragh, County Kildare
- Burial place: St Conleth's Cemetery, Newbridge, County Kildare
- Relatives: Dermot Earley Jnr (son)
- Military career
- Allegiance: Ireland
- Branch: Irish Defence Forces
- Service years: 1965—2010
- Rank: Lieutenant General
- Commands: Chief of Staff 2007—2010
- Awards: DSM with Honour
- Gaelic games career
- Native name: Diarmuid Ó Maolmhoichéirghe (Mór) (Irish)
- Height: 6 ft 0 in (183 cm)
- Sport: Gaelic football
- Position: Midfield
Clubs
- Years: Club
- 1960s–1970s 1970s–1980s: Michael Glavey's; Sarsfield's
Club titles
- Roscommon titles: 1
Inter-county
- Years: County
- 1965–85: Roscommon
Inter-county titles
- Connacht titles: 5
- All-Irelands: 0
- NFL: 1
- All Stars: 2

Lieutenant-General Dermot Earley DSM (24 February 1948 – 23 June 2010) was an Irish military officer. He was the Chief of Staff of the Defence Forces from 2007 to 2010, and previously held roles with the United Nations.

== Early life and education ==
Earley was born in Castlebar, Co Mayo in 1948. He was educated at Gorthaganny N.S. where his father Peadar was a principal teacher and later he attended St. Nathy's College in Ballaghaderreen, County Roscommon.

== Army career ==
After completing his Leaving Certificate in 1965 Earley joined the Defence Forces as a cadet and was commissioned in 1967. His first posting was as a platoon commander in the Recruit Training Depot at the Curragh and in 1969 he was appointed an instructor at the Army School of Physical Culture (ASPC). Two years later, in 1971, Earley obtained a specialist diploma in physical education at St. Mary's College, Twickenham.

Earley's service record included overseas service with UNTSO in 1975, Adjutant to the 52nd Infantry Battalion UNIFIL. From 1987 to 1991, he served as deputy military adviser to UN secretary-general Javier Pérez de Cuéllar and Battalion Commander of the 81st Infantry Battalion UNIFIL in 1997. While serving with the UN up to 1991 he was a member of negotiating teams dealing with the Iraqis and Kuwaitis, and was a key adviser during the setting up of the UN's mission in Kuwait – Unikom. He was involved in negotiating an end to the Angolan civil war. He is a graduate of the Royal College of Defence Studies, London (2001) and holds a Master of Arts (Hons) in peace and development studies from the University of Limerick (1999). He undertook the Ranger Course in the Defence Forces, which led to the establishment of special operations training and the establishment of the Army Ranger Wing (ARW). He was the last serving member of that course.

Earley was appointed school commandant of the ASPC. In 1991 he was appointed an instructor at the Command and Staff School of the Military College and in 1994/95 he helped establish the United Nations Training School Ireland (UNTSI) in the Military College.

He was promoted to lieutenant colonel in 1995. He commanded the 27 Infantry Battalion on the Irish border. He was promoted to colonel in 2001. In December 2003 he was made brigadier general and was appointed major general in March 2004 when he received his final appointment. He replaced lieutenant general James Sreenan. He became chief of staff in April 2007, leading the Army, Air Corps and Naval Service.

On 18 April 2010 Earley indicated he would retire from the Defence Forces due to ill health. Lt Gen Earley was awarded a Distinguished Service Medal with Honour from the Taoiseach Brian Cowen. His resignation was accepted on 9 June 2010 and one of his previous deputies, Major General Sean McCann, was appointed Chief of Staff. Lt Gen Dermot Earley died of Creutzfeldt–Jakob disease (CJD) on 23 June 2010 at the age of 62.

His Newbridge funeral on 24 June 2010 was attended by the Taoiseach Brian Cowen, Irish government ministers and leading GAA figures, while former Taoiseach Liam Cosgrave issued a statement calling him "one of the great figures of this country".

== Football career ==
=== Minor and under-21 ===
Earley first joined the Roscommon minor football team in 1963, at the age of fifteen. In that year, Earley's side reached the Connacht Minor Football Championship (MFC) final, losing-out to Mayo.

Two years later, in 1965, Earley lined out in a second Connacht MFC decider. Five-in-a-row hopefuls Mayo were beaten by Roscommon, giving Earley a Connacht MFC title. Roscommon were later defeated in the All-Ireland MFC semi-final.

In 1966, Roscommon again faced Mayo in a Connacht MFC decider, this time Earley's side being beaten. That year Earley was also a member of Roscommon's under-21 team, and he also met Mayo in this grade in the Connacht Under-21 Football Championship final. Earley's side won the game, gaining Earley his first Connacht U21FC winners' medal. Roscommon later qualified for the All-Ireland U21FC final, where reigning champion Kildare were defeated by Earley's side, earning him an All-Ireland U21FC winners' medal.

By 1969, when Earley was still eligible for the under-21 grade, he was appointed captain for the year. The provincial decider that year saw Roscommon face Galway, with the sides finishing level. In the subsequent replay, Roscommon took the title, and Earley had his second Connacht U21FC title. Roscommon later qualified for a second All-Ireland U21FC final in four years, with Antrim ultimately winning.

Earley also played under-21 hurling with Roscommon. In 1969, he played in the All-Ireland U21HC final where Roscommon faced Kildare; however Kildare won on the day.

=== Senior ===
Earley was only seventeen years-old when he made his senior debut for Roscommon in 1965. Playing with the senior team for several years, by 1970, Earley lined out in his first senior provincial decider. Galway defeated Roscommon in the game by a scoreline of 2–15 to 1–8.

Two years later, in 1972, Roscommon were back in the Connacht SFC final. Playing against Mayo, Roscommon took their first provincial title in ten years. It was Earley's first Connacht SFC title. Roscommon's next game was an All-Ireland SFC semi-final meeting with Kerry, which Kerry won.

After surrendering their provincial title in 1973, Roscommon faced Galway in the provincial decider a year later. Earley was one of the few players to shine as his team lost heavily by a scoreline of 2–14 to 0–8. His efforts were later rewarded when he was presented with his first All-Star award.

In 1977, a new-look Roscommon team saw Earley's side finally defeat Galway, and he received a second Connacht SFC winners' medal. Roscommon subsequently faced Armagh in an All-Ireland SFC semi-final. A draw meant a replay was required, which Armagh won by a single point.

The Connacht series of games provided little difficulty for Earley's side again in 1978. Roscommon defeated Galway in the final, gaining Earley his third Connacht SFC title. The subsequent All-Ireland SFC semi-final pitted Earley against reigning champion Kerry – a game which Kerry won comfortably by a scoreline of 3–11 to 0–8.

Roscommon made it three consecutive Connacht SFC titles in 1979, defeating Mayo by a scoreline of 3–15 to 2–10. It was Earley's fourth provincial winners' medal. The team then met Dublin in the All-Ireland SFC, with Dublin winning by a single point. Though Roscommon did not advance to that year's All-Ireland SFC final, Earley was later presented with a second All-Star award.

In 1980, a fourth Connacht SFC title in succession was claimed. It was a fifth provincial winners' medal for Earley. Roscommon, at last, won the subsequent All-Ireland SFC semi-final, and – after that defeat of Armagh – Earley lined out against Kerry in the year's All-Ireland SFC final. Roscommon took a five-point lead inside the first twelve minutes. But Mikey Sheehy popped up to score the decisive goal for Kerry, with 'the Kingdom' securing a 1–9 to 1–6 victory, in a game that had sixty-four frees.

In 1985, Earley sustained a fractured jaw in the Connacht SFC semi-final against Galway. When he was leaving the field he received a standing ovation as many thought that would be his farewell to football. Earley confounded everybody and lined out in the Connacht SFC final against Mayo two weeks later. In spite of Earley kicking six points, Mayo still won by a scoreline of 2–11 to 0–8. At the age of thirty-seven, Earley decided to retire from inter-county football.

Earley is his county's top scorer in National Football League history, finishing his career with 17–316 (367) in that competition.

In May 2020, the Irish Independent named Earley as one of the "dozens of brilliant players" who narrowly missed selection for its "Top 20 footballers in Ireland over the past 50 years".

== Management ==
During the 1990s, Earley managed both the Roscommon county football team (from 1992 until 1994) and the Kildare county football team (1994 to 1996).

== Personal life ==
Earley was married with six children. The family lived in Kildare. His younger brother, Paul, and his son, Dermot Earley Jnr, were both Gaelic footballers. Paul Earley, like Dermot Snr, was an All Star recipient for Roscommon, and, while Dermot Jnr was also an All Star winner, he played his football for Kildare.

Military offices
| Preceded by James Sreenan | Chief of Staff of the Defence Forces; 2007–2010 | Succeeded by Sean McCann |
Sporting positions
| Preceded by | Roscommon Senior Football Manager; 1992–1994 | Succeeded by Donie Shine |
| Preceded by Mick O'Dwyer | Kildare Senior Football Manager; 1994–1997 | Succeeded by Mick O'Dwyer |
