= Chief of Staff of the Defence Forces (Ireland) =

Senior military officer in the Irish army

Chief of Staff of Defence Forces Ireland
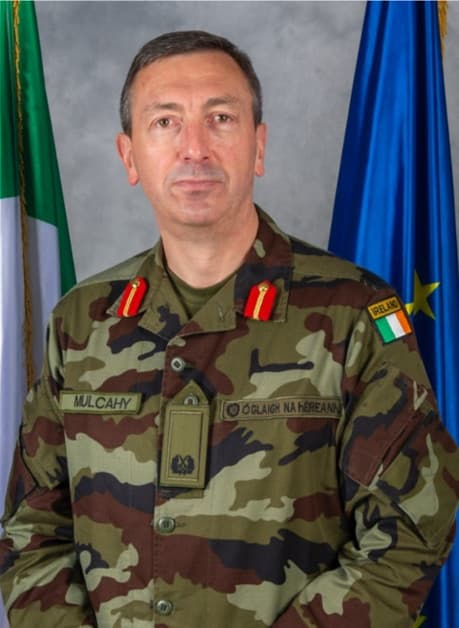
- Incumbent; Lieutenant General Rossa Mulcahy (Irish Army) since 1 June 2025
- Defence Forces
- Member of: National Security Committee
- Reports to: Minister for Defence
- Nominator: Government of Ireland on the recommendation of the Minister for Defence
- Appointer: President of Ireland
- Website: Official website

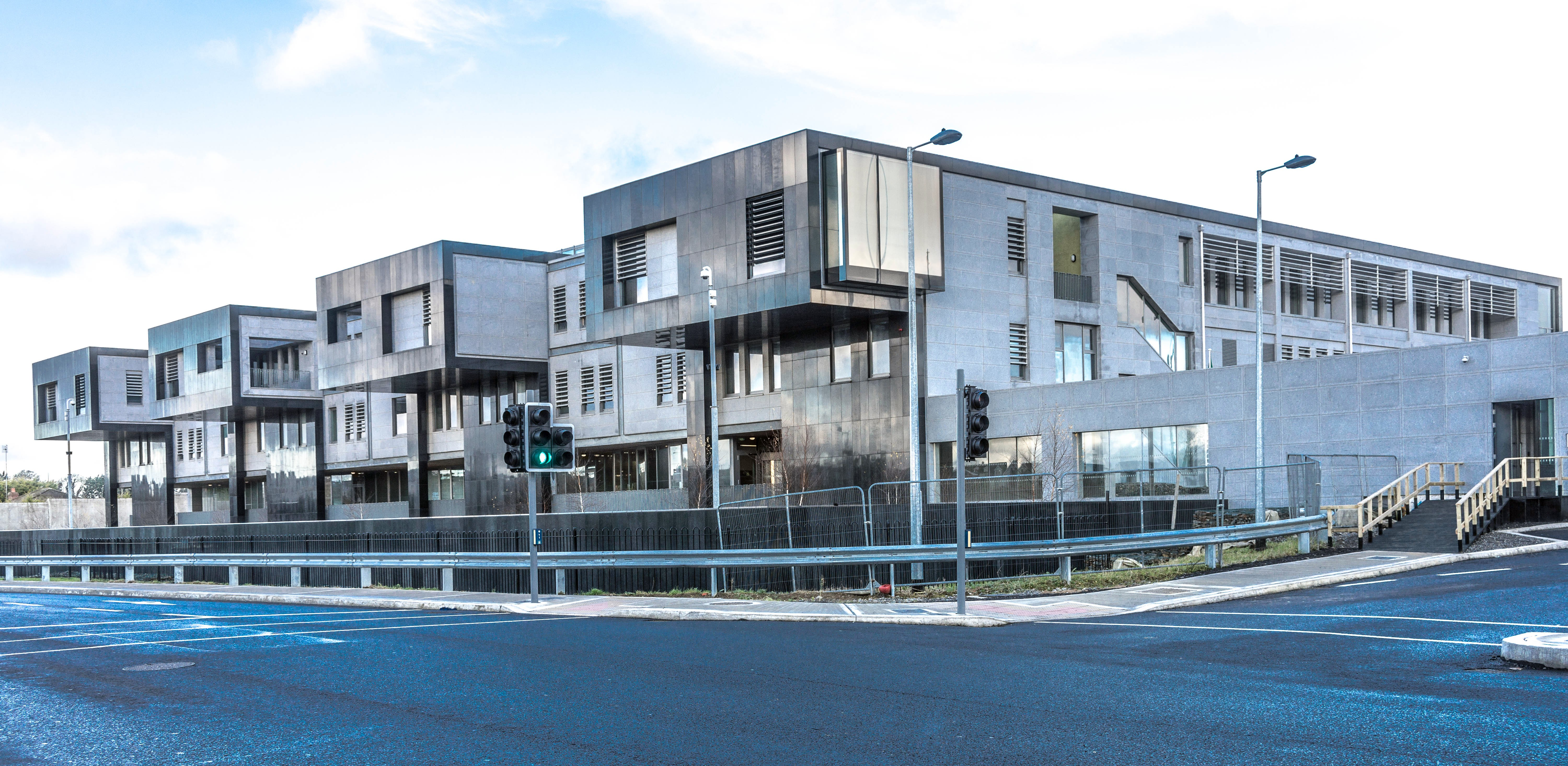
The office of the General Staff are located at the DF/DoD HQ in Newbridge, County Kildare

The Chief of Staff of the Defence Forces (COS) (Irish: Ceann Foirne na bhFórsaí Cosanta) is charged with the executive management of the Irish Defence Forces, and is the most senior military officer of the Army, Naval Service and Air Corps branches. The Chief of Staff is appointed by the President of Ireland, who is the Supreme Commander of the Defence Forces, on the recommendation of the Minister for Defence subject to the approval of the Government of Ireland. The office of the Chief of Staff consists of his personal staff, a strategic planning office, a public relations section and the military judge.

The Defence Forces Chief of Staff sits on the government's National Security Committee (NSC).

The Chief of Staff delegates remaining executive duties to two deputy chiefs of staff (who hold the rank of major general or equivalent) and one assistant chief of staff (brigadier general or equivalent);

- The Deputy Chief of Staff Operations (D COS Ops) is tasked with operational matters.
- The Deputy Chief of Staff Support (D COS Sp) is tasked with military support matters.
- The Assistant Chief of Staff Support (ACOS Sp) is also tasked with military support matters.

As of June 2025, the Chief of Staff of the Defence Forces was Lieutenant General Rossa Mulcahy.

== Current General Staff of the Defence Forces ==
Position	Abbreviation	Photograph	Incumbent	Branch
Chief of Staff	COS		Lieutenant General Rossa Mulcahy	Army
Deputy Chief of Staff Operations	D COS Ops		Major General John Whittaker	Army
Deputy Chief of Staff Support	D COS Sp		Major General Colm O'Luasa	Army
Assistant Chief of Staff	ACOS		Brigadier General Neil Nolan	Army

== Brigade Commanders ==
The country is divided into two areas for administrative and operational reasons, and in each area there is an Irish Army infantry brigade. The two brigade group structure envisages distinct operational areas of responsibility for each of the brigades and is supported in their responsibilities by the Naval Service and Air Corps. Each of the Brigade formations and the Air Corps are commanded by a Brigadier General, while the Naval Service is commanded by a Commodore;

Position	Branch	Abbreviation	Photograph	Incumbent
General Officer Commanding	1st Brigade (Army)	GOC 1 Brigade		Brigadier General Caimin Keogh
General Officer Commanding	2nd Brigade (Army)	GOC 2 Brigade		Brigadier General Stephen Ryan
General Officer Commanding	Defence Forces Training Centre (Army)	GOC DFTC		Brigadier General Louis Flynn
General Officer Commanding	Air Corps	GOC Air Corps		Brigadier General Rory O'Connor
Flag Officer Commanding	Naval Service	FOCNS		Commodore Darragh Kirwan

== List of Irish Chiefs of Staff ==
No.	Portrait	Chief of Staff	Took office	Left office	Time in office	Defence branch
1	Eoin O'Duffy	General; Eoin O'Duffy (1890–1944)	February 1922	July 1922	5 months	Army
2	Richard Mulcahy	General; Richard Mulcahy (1886–1971)	July 1922	August 1922	1 month	Army
3	Seán Mac Mahon	General; Seán Mac Mahon (1893–1955)	August 1922	March 1924	1 year, 7 months	Army
4	Peadar MacMahon	General; Peadar MacMahon	March 1924	March 1927	3 years	Army
5	Daniel Hogan	General; Daniel Hogan (1895–?)	March 1927	February 1929	1 year, 11 months	Army
6	Seán Mac Eoin	General; Seán Mac Eoin (1893–1973)	February 1929	October 1929	8 months	Army
7	Joseph Sweeney	Lieutenant General; Joseph Sweeney (1897–1980)	October 1929	October 1931	2 years	Army
8	Michael Brennan	Lieutenant General; Michael Brennan (1896–1986)	October 1931	January 1940	8 years, 3 months	Army
9	Daniel McKenna	Lieutenant General; Daniel McKenna	January 1940	January 1949	9 years	Army
10	Liam Archer	Lieutenant General; Liam Archer	January 1949	January 1952	3 years	Army
11	William A. Egan	Lieutenant General; William A. Egan	January 1952	December 1954	2 years, 11 months	Army
12	Patrick Mulcahy	Lieutenant General; Patrick Mulcahy	January 1955	December 1959	4 years, 11 months	Army
13	John McKeown DSM	Lieutenant General; John McKeown DSM (1910–1998)	January 1960	December 1960	11 months	Army
14	Sean Collins Powell	Lieutenant General; Sean Collins Powell (1905–1991)	January 1961	March 1962	1 year, 2 months	Army
(13)	John McKeown DSM	Lieutenant General; John McKeown DSM (1910–1998)	April 1962	March 1971	8 years, 11 months	Army
15	Patrick Delaney	Major General; Patrick Delaney	April 1971	July 1971	3 months	Army
15	Thomas O'Carroll	Lieutenant General; Thomas O'Carroll	April 1971	July 1976	5 years, 3 months	Army
16	Carl O'Sullivan DSM	Lieutenant General; Carl O'Sullivan DSM	August 1976	June 1981	4 years, 11 months	Army
17	Louis Hogan DSM	Lieutenant General; Louis Hogan DSM (1921–2001)	June 1981	April 1984	2 years, 10 months	Army
18	Gerald O'Sullivan	Lieutenant General; Gerald O'Sullivan	April 1984	February 1986	1 year, 10 months	Army
19	Tadgh O'Neill	Lieutenant General; Tadgh O'Neill	February 1986	October 1989	3 years, 8 months	Army
20	James Parker DSM	Lieutenant General; James Parker DSM (1929–2020)	October 1989	April 1992	2 years, 6 months	Army
21	James Noel Bergin DSM	Lieutenant General; James Noel Bergin DSM	April 1992	December 1994	2 years, 8 months	Army
22	Gerald McMahon DSM	Lieutenant General; Gerald McMahon DSM	February 1995	August 1998	3 years, 6 months	Army
23	David Stapleton DSM	Lieutenant General; David Stapleton DSM	August 1998	24 September 2000	2 years, 1 month	Army
24	Colm Mangan DSM	Lieutenant General; Colm Mangan DSM	25 September 2000	20 February 2004	3 years, 4 months	Army
25	James Sreenan DSM	Lieutenant General; James Sreenan DSM	21 February 2004	28 June 2007	3 years, 4 months	Army
26	Dermot Earley DSM	Lieutenant General; Dermot Earley DSM (1948–2010)	28 June 2007	9 June 2010	2 years, 11 months	Army
27	Sean McCann DSM	Lieutenant General; Sean McCann DSM	9 June 2010	12 August 2013	3 years, 2 months	Army
28	Conor O'Boyle DSM	Lieutenant General; Conor O'Boyle DSM	12 August 2013	29 September 2015	2 years, 1 month	Army
29	Mark Mellett DSM	Vice Admiral; Mark Mellett DSM (born 1958)	29 September 2015	29 September 2021	6 years	Naval Service
30	Seán Clancy	Lieutenant General; Seán Clancy	29 September 2021	1 June 2025	3 years, 8 months	Air Corps
31	Rossa Mulcahy	Lieutenant General; Rossa Mulcahy	1 June 2025	Incumbent	1 year, 4 months	Army

== See also ==
- Minister for Defence (Ireland)
- Director of Military Intelligence (Ireland)
- Garda Commissioner
