= William Alfred Browne =

British civil servant (1831–1904)

William Alfred Browne FRGS FZS (1831 – 15 August 1904) was an Anglo-Irish civil servant who served four decades at the War Office.

He was born in Armagh, Ireland, the son of John Browne. He was educated at Corlatt House, the private school of the Rev. John Bleakeley, in Killymarly, County Monaghan. He received his university education at Queens College Galway, under Sir Thomas W. Moffett. In 1855, he was awarded a B.A. from Queens University Ireland. He won the university gold medal in logic and mental philosophy and the senior scholarship in logic, mental and moral philosophy, and political and legal science. In 1857, he earned the title of Doctor of Laws, and the Master of Arts degree in 1882. Browne was a Fellow of the Royal Geographical, Meteorological, Botanical, and Zoological Societies, and of the Society of Arts.

Browne entered the War Office in 1856 and became a senior clerk in 1878. He became a principal in the Finance Department in 1890 and retired from the War Office in 1897. He succeeded Sir Henry W. Gordon as editor of a War Office publication, The Priced Vocabulary Stores used in Her Majesty's Service, for the 1879 and 1882 editions. He was also a contributor to The Imperial Dictionary of Universal Biography and was the author of numerous other works, including Treatise on Arithmetic and The Handbook of Money Weights and Measures of All Nations.

The Browne Scholarship at Queen's College, Galway in the French and German Languages was created in honour of his wife, Caroline Charlotte White Browne, FZS.

He died in Karlovy Vary on 15 August 1904.
