= Gerard Jennings =

Irish physicist

Gerard Jennings, also known as Professor S. Gerard Jennings, is an Irish Professor of Physics at the University of Galway, in Ireland.

Jennings is the Director of the Environmental Change Institute (ECI), which is a multidisciplinary research centre involving collaboration between researchers from various faculties of NUI, Galway and other research centres across Ireland. He also directs the Atmospheric Research Group, in the Department of Physics at NUI, Galway.

In 2001 he was conferred with the degree of Doctor Honoris Causa (Honorary Doctorate) by the University of Gothenburg, Sweden. The degree was awarded in recognition of the world-recognised research achievements of Professor Jennings in the field of Atmospheric Science, which embraces aerosol and cloud physics, and climate and environmental change.
