= Aiken Barracks =

Army barracks in Dundalk, Ireland

- Dún Mhic Aogáin
- Dundalk, County Louth in Ireland
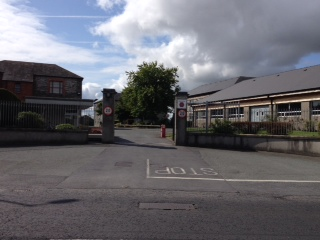
- Main Entrance to Aiken Barracks

Site information
- Type: Barracks
- Owner: Department of Defence
- Operator: Irish Army

Location
- Location within Ireland
- Coordinates: 54°00′20″N 6°22′48″W
- Area: 18 acres

Site history
- Battles/wars: Irish Civil War

Garrison information
- Garrison: 27 Infantry Battalion

Aiken Barracks (Irish: Dún Mhic Aogáin) is an army barracks located in Dundalk, County Louth, Ireland. The barracks was originally known as Dundalk Barracks and was renamed after Frank Aiken, a commander of the Irish Republican Army and an Irish politician. It is the current Headquarters of the 27 Infantry Battalion of the Irish Army.

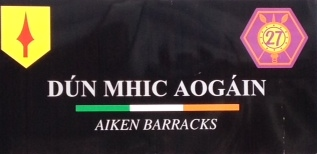
Aiken Barracks Signage

== History ==
=== British Army ===
The barracks was established following the Irish Rebellion in 1798 on the site of a disused linen mill located on Parliament Square. The oldest building dates back to 1810.

Arthur Samuel Richardson, a British Army surgeon, died in 1816 aged 38 from a wound he received in the Officers' Mess in Dundalk Barracks. His fatal wound was the result of a duel he had with a fellow officer who, allegedly, made a disparaging remark about a young woman of Richardson's acquaintance. Richardson's remains were buried in St. Nicholas Green Church graveyard in Dundalk. He had the grim distinction of being the last man to die as a result of a duel in Ireland. Reports suggest that the incident was more of a barrack-room brawl than a formal duel but his ghost reputedly haunted the Mess afterwards.

The barracks was rebuilt by the British in 1825, where it accommodated a cavalry regiment. The barracks saw varied use over the following 70 years as it was occupied by various units of dragoons, lancers and hussars. In 1902 it was once again rebuilt to accommodate a newly established artillery regiment.

The 28th Brigade Royal Field Artillery and D Squadron of the North Irish Horse were stationed in Dundalk just before the start of the Great War in 1914. 28th Brigade Royal Field Artillery at that time comprised 122, 123 and 124 Batteries, with the brigade being under the command of 5th Division.

17th (Reserve) Battalion of the Royal Irish Rifles moved from Ballykinlar in October 1915 to Dundalk in August 1917 before moving to England in April 1918. 397 Battery Royal Field Artillery was based in Dundalk at the end of the Great War in November 1918. The last British soldiers to occupy the barracks, who were from the Royal Field Artillery, left on 13 April 1922.

=== Irish Civil War ===
On 13 April 1922 the 4th Northern Division commanded by Commandant General Frank Aiken occupied Dundalk barracks as the British forces evacuated Free State territory under the terms of the Anglo-Irish Treaty. The Irish Civil War began in June 1922 and on 16 July 1922 the pro-treaty 5th Northern Division led by Dan Hogan occupied Dundalk taking Aiken and his men prisoner. Just eleven days later on 27 July, some of Aiken’s IRA command under Padraig Quinn blew a hole in the wall of Dundalk prison and in fifteen minutes the operation resulted in the freeing of Republican prisoners, including Aiken himself. Aiken now prepared to free the remaining republican prisoners held in Dundalk barracks. Aiken’s troops were armed with small arms and explosives because they had been supplied up until a month before by the very Army they were now going to attack. Aiken organised boats to ferry his 300-strong force across the Castletown River into Dundalk and equipped two storming parties of ten men with submachine guns and explosives.

The attack commenced at 4:00 am on 14 August. Though several mines failed to explode, one did blast in the back gate. The surviving sentries were machine-gunned and the walls breached. After the back gate was destroyed by the explosion Frank Aiken and about nine men rushed the breach and got through. A heavy fire was soon directed onto the attacking troops from some of the barrack rooms. However, the attackers got the upper hand as prisoners were captured. Bags of about 8 to 10 lbs of explosives were thrown into the windows of the ground floors of the barrack rooms. When those exploded the inmates generally surrendered. The attack had been successful and 400 rifles and a large volume of ammunition were captured. Over 300 republican prisoners had been freed from the barracks and prison in Dundalk. However, Patrick McKenna, a member of Aiken’s Division, had captured a Lancia armoured car from pro-Treaty troops elsewhere in Dundalk. When he drove it through the main gate of the barracks after the fighting had ended, his comrades, mistaking it for a Free State counter-attack, detonated a mine, killing McKenna and another man Rogers.

Five pro-Treaty soldiers were dead or dying and 15 injured. Two Republicans were killed, both by their own mine, and up to 30 wounded in the fighting. Reportedly one civilian also died.

Dan Hogan travelled from Dublin to Dundalk with a heavily armed column (including artillery and armoured vehicles) and retook Dundalk without resistance - shooting only an unfortunate civilian who failed to stop at a roadblock.

=== Post Civil War ===
The 58 Infantry Battalion was based in the barracks at the end of the Civil War. The barracks was occupied by the Army until 1928 when part of the barracks was leased to Rawson's Footwear until 1967 when the factory closed down. In 1934 the Volunteer Force was established with the Regiment of Oriel being based in Dundalk barracks. During The Emergency (1939-1945) 3 & 4 Cyclist Squadrons were based in Dundalk Barracks.

=== The Troubles ===
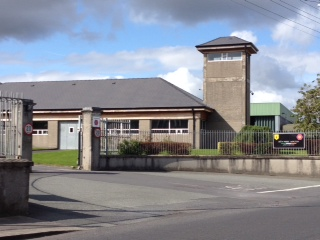
Observation Tower at Aiken Barracks

In 1957, at the time of the IRA Border Campaign, the Army briefly based troops in Dundalk Barracks. From the late 1960s, during The Troubles, the Irish Government sent soldiers to the border area. Initially, the company-sized 1 Infantry Group was formed in Dundalk Barracks to operate along the border, however as the Troubles escalated, it was decided to establish an infantry battalion as a permanent replacement for the border infantry group. In September 1973, the 27 Infantry Battalion was established. From its activation the 27 Infantry Battalion's Headquarters, Headquarters Company and A Company has been based in Dundalk.

=== 21st century ===
In January 2009, B and Support Companies moved to Aiken Barracks when Monaghan Military Barracks closed. B Company has since 2012 been based in Gormanston Camp, County Meath. The 27 Infantry Battalion celebrated 40 years since its establishment with a parade in Dundalk town on 31 August 2013.

== Incidents ==
A female soldier referred to as an Irish Army Poster Girl made an allegation of being sexually assaulted by another soldier whilst based at Aiken Barracks. Second Lieutenant Collette McBarron, a former Miss Ireland contestant, made the allegation against a fellow serving soldier which resulted in a full investigation by Irish Military Police. Following extensive enquiries, however, charges were dismissed as a result of lack of evidence.

In the early hours of Monday 27 May 2013, an oil tanker containing illegal fuel which had been seized by the Irish Revenue Commissioners was stolen from Aiken Barracks and driven away. The tanker was one of a number of vehicles which had been part of a seizure at an illegal oil laundering plant in Drumacon, County Monaghan and was subsequently stored at Aiken Barracks. Thieves breached the security of the base and made off in the lorry, which contained 20,000 litres of fuel valued at €30,000, and which was then driven at high speed through the main gates of the Barracks (which were locked at the time). Soldiers who were on duty at the barracks' entrance were taken by surprise and the main gates sustained substantial damage as a result of the incident.

== See also ==
- List of Irish military installations
