= Maureen O'Brien (Irish Army officer) =

Irish Army general

Major General Maureen O'Brien DSM
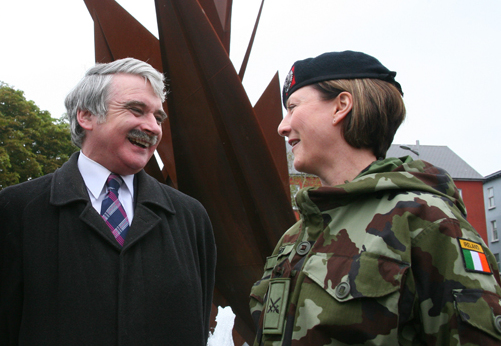
- O'Brien as a Commandant (right) with then-Defence Minister Willie O'Dea before deploying to Chad in 2009
- Born: 1960 (age 65–66); Galway, Ireland
- Military career
- Allegiance: Ireland
- Branch: Army; Infantry Corps
- Service years: 1981–2023
- Rank: Major General (OF-7)
- Commands: Deputy Military Advisor to the USG for Peace Operations; Deputy Force Commander UNDOF; Director J6; Officer Commanding 27 Infantry Battalion; Deputy Commander 100 Inf Bn MINURCAT
- Awards: DSM with Honour

Major General Maureen O'Brien DSM is a retired Irish Army general and former Deputy Military Advisor in the United Nations Office of Military Affairs, Department of Peace Operations. O'Brien had previously been Deputy Force Commander of the United Nations Disengagement Observer Force (UNDOF) in the Golan Heights from September 2019 to March 2021 (and Acting Force Commander from October 2019 to July 2020). O'Brien has completed 8 overseas missions, including serving in Lebanon, Western Sahara, East Timor, Sarajevo (OSCE) and Chad.

== Early life and education ==
O'Brien is a native of Galway city, and graduated from University College Galway with a Bachelor of Science and Higher Diploma in Education.

She holds a first class master's degree in Leadership, Management and Defence Studies from Maynooth University and has completed a postgraduate diploma in IT from University College Cork.

== Military career ==
After spending time as a teacher, O'Brien joined the Cadet School in 1981 - one year after the Army allowed women to apply. On commissioning in 1983 she was posted as an Infantry Officer, to the 4th Infantry Battalion, Cork, before returning to the Cadet School some years later as an instructor.

O'Brien was the first woman to be promoted the rank of Lieutenant Colonel, Colonel, Brigadier General and Major General. She was the first woman to be appointed a Battalion Commander, that of 27 Infantry Battalion in 2012. As Colonel, she was appointed Director of the CIS Corps in 2016, responsible for all communications and information technology across the Army, Naval Service and Air Corps.

Her career has included extensive overseas experience, with her first two deployments being to the United Nations Interim Force in Lebanon, serving as a Captain in MINURSO in the Western Sahara and UNTAET in East Timor. She assumed the role as Second-in-command (2IC) of a 420-strong infantry battalion with MINURCAT in Chad and was deployed as Chief of Operations Planning in a multinational sector headquarters in Lebanon (UNIFIL). O'Brien has held appointment in the Operations Branch of Defence Forces Headquarters where she was the senior staff officer responsible for EU and NATO/PfP engagement.

At the time of her promotion in 2019 to brigadier general, O'Brien was described as "one of the most accomplished officers operationally in the Defence Forces". As Deputy Force Commander, O'Brien was responsible for ensuring that directives were met within UNDOF for the force commander, and for liaising with the Israel Defense Forces (IDF) and Syria.

In May 2021, O'Brien was promoted to major general, and appointed Deputy Military Advisor to the UN Secretary General for Peace Operations in United Nations Headquarters, New York.
