= Sean McCann (Irish Army general) =

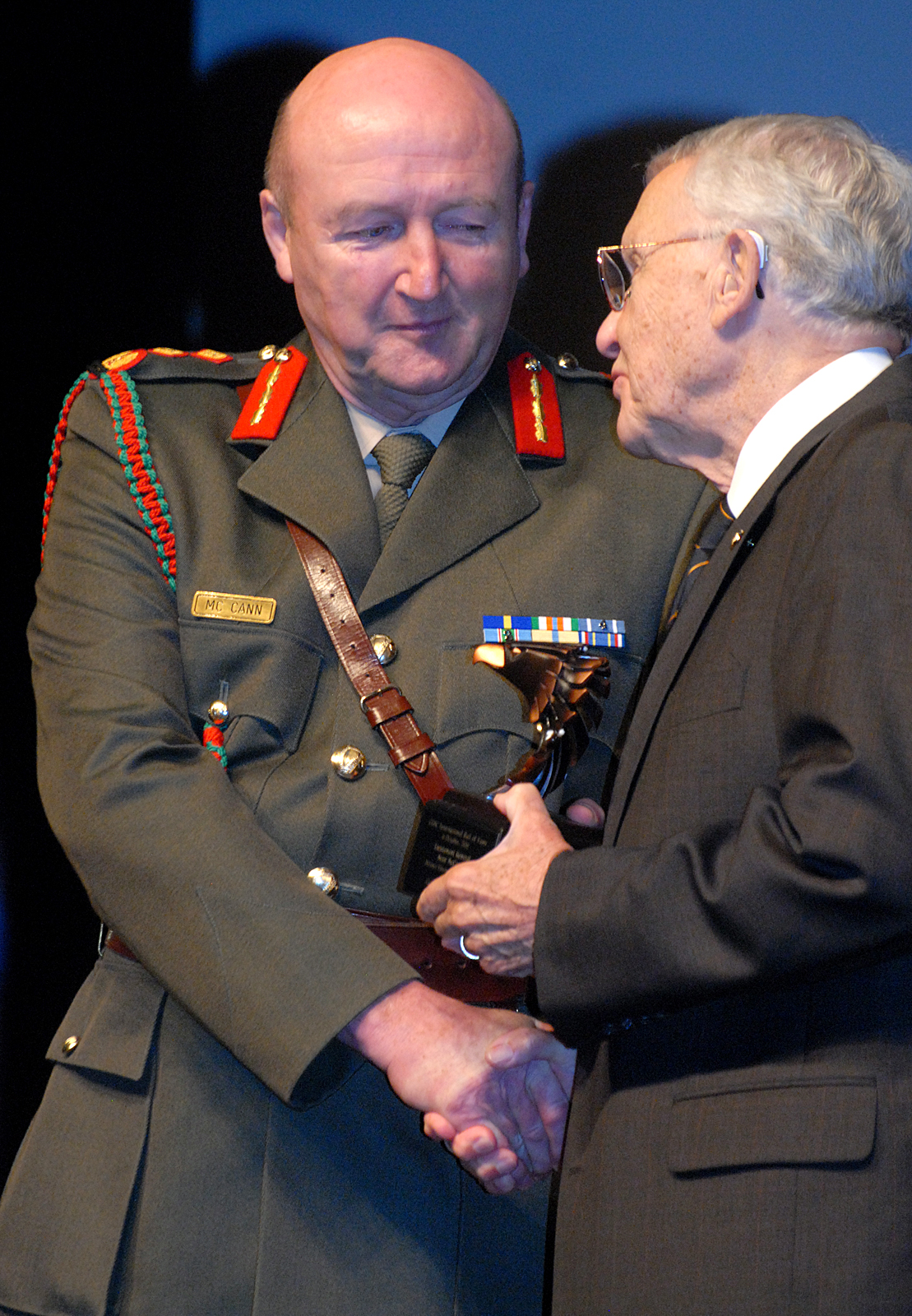
- Lt Gen. McCann being inducted into the International Hall of Fame
- Born: Cork, County Cork, Ireland
- Allegiance: Irish Defence Forces
- Branch: Cavalry Corps
- Service years: 1970-12 August 2013
- Rank: Lieutenant General
- Commands: Chief of Staff of the Defence Forces

Lieutenant General Sean McCann was the Chief of Staff of the Defence Forces from 9 June 2010 until his retirement on 12 August 2013. He assumed command in 2010 upon the retirement of Lieutenant General Dermot Earley, DSM.

McCann joined in the Army as a cadet in 1970. Commissioned as a Cavalry officer he was previously an instructor at the United Nations Training School Ireland and the Military College, Director of Cavalry, Director of Operations, and most recently Deputy Chief of Staff (Ops). He has been deployed overseas six times to Lebanon, Israel, the Iraqi/Kuwaiti border and the former Yugoslavia.

McCann is a graduate of University College Galway (from which he obtained a Bachelor of Commerce degree in 1974) and the United States Army Command and General Staff College. In October 2011, McCann was honoured as an inductee into the International Hall of Fame of the Army Command and General Staff College, which honours previous international graduates who have reached the highest positions in their respective armed forces or similar positions in multinational military organizations. McCann was President (2013–15) of Newbridge RFC.

Military offices
Preceded by Dermot Earley	Chief of Staff of the Defence Forces; 2010–2013	Succeeded by Conor O'Boyle
