= Louis Hogan =

Irish general

- Born: 4 April 1921
- Died: 21 June 2001 (aged 80)
- Military career
- Allegiance: Ireland
- Branch: Irish Army
- Service years: 1940–1984
- Rank: Lieutenant general
- Commands: Chief of Staff of the Irish Defence Forces; Quartermaster-General; GOC Western Command
- Awards: DSM with Honour; Commander of the Order of the Polar Star

Lieutenant General Louis Hogan DSM (4 April 1921 – 21 June 2001), was an officer in the Irish Defence Forces. He joined the army in 1940, being commissioned into the Infantry Corps the following year. His 44-year service included tours in the Congo, Cyprus, and Syria. His senior appointments included Director of Intelligence in 1978, General Officer Commanding, Western Command and Quartermaster General both 1980, and lastly Chief of Staff from 1981 to 1984. He died on 21 June 2001 at the age of 80.

Military offices
Preceded by Carl O'Sullivan	Chief of Staff of the Defence Forces; 1981–1984	Succeeded by Gerald O'Sullivan
