= Distinguished Service Medal (Ireland) =

Distinguished Service Medal An Bonn Seirbhíse Dearscna
- Distinguished Service Medal with Honour Distinguished Service Medal with Distinction Distinguished Service Medal with Merit
- Awarded for: Individual acts of bravery, courage, leadership, resource or devotion to duty
- Presented by: Ireland
- Eligibility: Officers, non-commissioned officers and privates/seaman/aircrew of the Defence Forces and members of the Army Nursing and Chaplaincy Services.
- Post-nominals: BSD
- Status: Currently awarded
- Established: 18 February 1964

Precedence
- Next (higher): Military Medal For Gallantry
- Next (lower): Good Conduct Medal

The Distinguished Service Medal (DSM) (Irish: An Bonn Seirbhíse Dearscna) is a military decoration issued by the Irish Government, created to recognize individual acts of courage, leadership, resourcefulness, or devotion to duty by a member of the Irish Defence Forces.

Recipients are entitled to use of the post-nominals BSD, the Irish abbreviation of the medal's name.

The Distinguished Service Medal is the second-highest military honour presented by the Republic of Ireland, second only to the Military Medal for Gallantry (An Bonn Míleata Calmachta). Unlike the Military Medal for Gallantry, the Distinguished Service Medal can be awarded either for meritorious actions, or for an act of heroism.

== History ==
The Distinguished Service Medal was created on 18 February 1964, to be awarded in three grades: 1st Class, 2nd Class, and 3rd Class, in similar fashion to the older Military Medal for Gallantry.

In January 1984, the three grades were renamed; 1st Class became with Honour, 2nd Class with Distinction, and 3rd Class with Merit.
