= Comparative army enlisted ranks of Anglophone countries =

Rank comparison chart of Non-commissioned officer and enlisted ranks for armies/land forces of Anglophone states.

== Enlisted ==
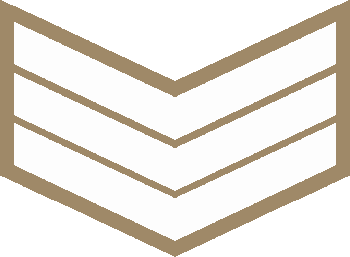
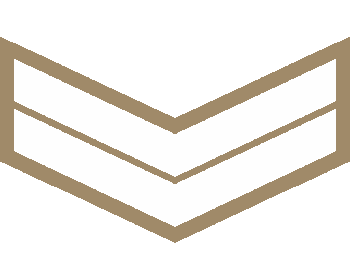
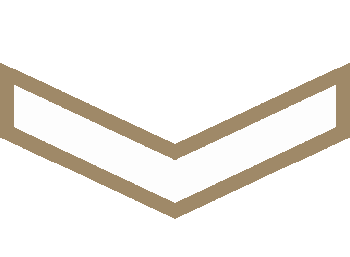
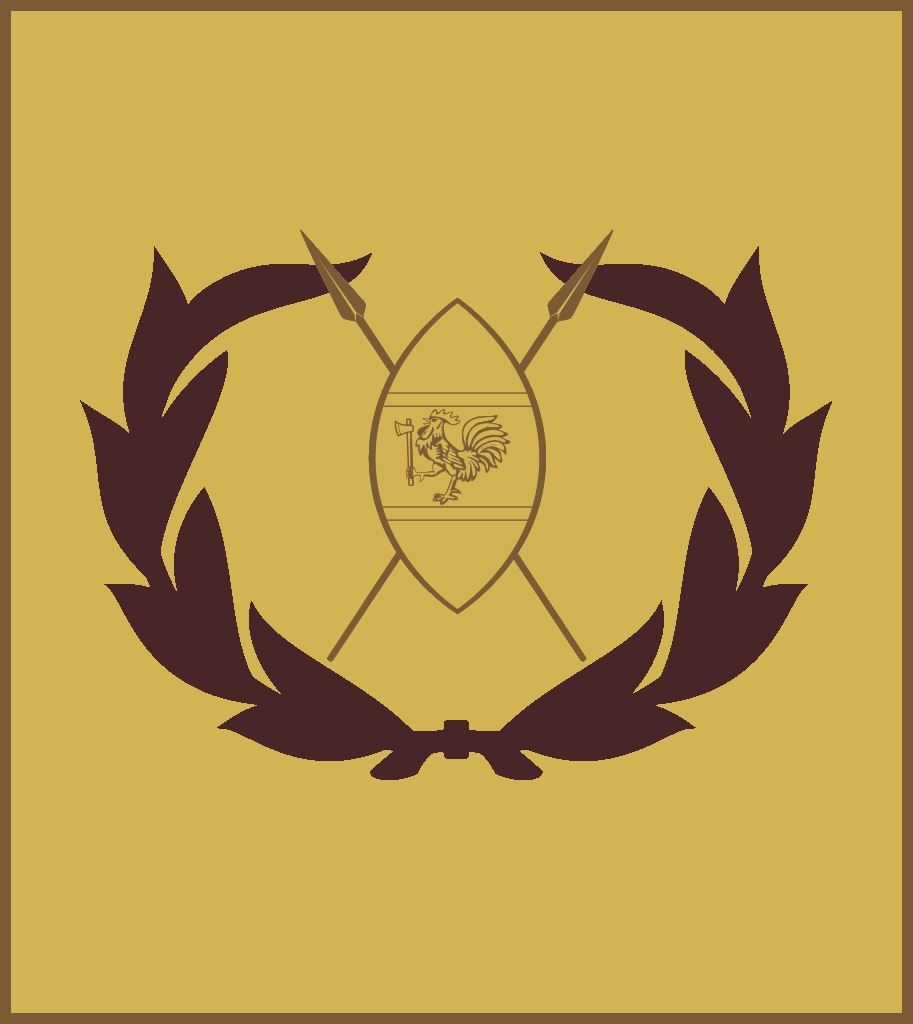
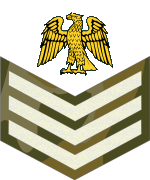
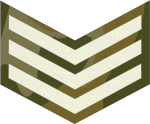
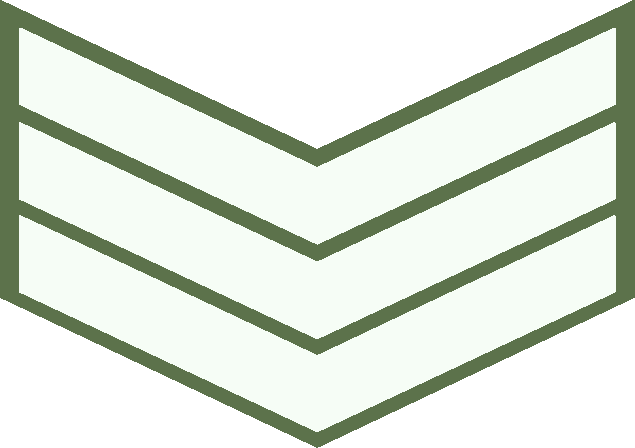
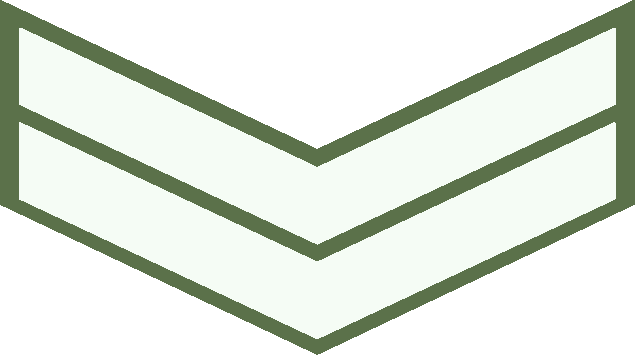
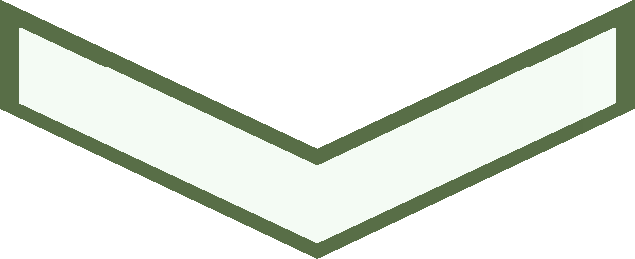
Rank group	Senior NCOs							Junior NCOs			Enlisted
Antigua and Barbuda Regiment											No insignia
Antigua and Barbuda Regiment	Warrant officer class 1		Warrant officer class 2		Staff sergeant	Sergeant		Corporal		Lance corporal	Private (or equivalent)
Australian Army											No insignia
Australian Army	Regimental sergeant major of the army	Warrant officer class 1	Warrant officer class 2			Sergeant		Corporal		Lance corporal	Private (or equivalent)
(The Bahamas) Bahamas	No army
Barbados Regiment											No insignia
Barbados Regiment	Warrant officer class 1		Warrant officer class 2		Staff sergeant	Sergeant		Corporal		Lance corporal	Private (or equivalent)
Belize Defence Force											No insignia
Belize Defence Force	Warrant officer class 1		Warrant officer class 2		Staff sergeant	Sergeant		Corporal		Lance corporal	Private (or equivalent)
Botswana Ground Force											No insignia
Botswana Ground Force	Warrant officer class 1		Warrant officer class 2		Staff sergeant	Sergeant		Corporal		Lance corporal	Private (or equivalent)
Burundi Army												No insignia
Burundi Army	Adjudant-major	Adjudant-chef	Adjudant		Première sergent major	Première sergent	Sergent	Caporal-chef		Caporal	Soldat de 1^{ère} classe	Soldat de 2^{ème} classe
Burundi Army	Ajida shefu	Ajida majoro	Ajida		Sereja majoro mu murwi wa mbere	Sereja mu murwi wa mbere	Sereja	Kaporari shefu		Kaporari	Umusoda wo mu murwi wa mbere	Umusoda wo mu murwi wa kabiri
Cameroon Ground Forces
Cameroon Ground Forces	Adjudant-chef		Adjudant			Sergent-chef	Sergent	Caporal-chef		Caporal	Soldat première	Soldat
Canadian Army
Canadian Army	Chief warrant officer		Master warrant officer		Warrant officer	Sergeant		Master corporal		Corporal	Private (trained)	Private (basic)
Canadian Army	Adjudant(e)-chef		Adjudant(e)-maître		Adjudant(e)	Sergent(e)		Caporal(e)-chef		Caporal(e)	Soldat(e) (formé(e))	Soldat(e) (confirmé(e))
Dominica	No army
Umbutfo Eswatini Defence Force												No insignia
Umbutfo Eswatini Defence Force	Warrant officer I		Warrant officer II			Staff Sergeant	Sergeant	Corporal		Lance Corporal		Private
Fiji Infantry Regiment											No insignia
Fiji Infantry Regiment	Warrant officer class 1		Warrant officer class 2		Staff sergeant	Sergeant		Corporal		Lance corporal	Private (or equivalent)
Gambian National Army											No insignia
Gambian National Army	Warrant officer class 1		Warrant officer class 2		Staff sergeant	Sergeant		Corporal		Lance corporal	Private (or equivalent)
Ghana Army											No insignia
Ghana Army	Warrant officer class 1		Warrant officer class 2		Staff sergeant	Sergeant		Corporal		Lance corporal	Private (or equivalent)
Grenada	No army
Guyana Army											No insignia
Guyana Army	Warrant officer class 1		Warrant officer class 2		Staff sergeant	Sergeant		Corporal		Lance corporal	Private (or equivalent)
Indian Army											No insignia
Indian Army	Subedar-major सूबेदार मेजर		Subedar सूबेदार		Naib subedar नायब सूबेदार	Havildar हवलदार		Naik नायक		Lance naik लांस नायक	Sepoy सिपाही
Irish Army												No insignia
Irish Army	Sergeant major		Regimental Quartermaster Sergeant		Company sergeant	Company quartermaster sergeant	Sergeant	Corporal		Private, 3 star	Private, 2 star	Recruit
Irish Army	Maor-Sáirsint Cathláin/Reisimint (Note: Battalion (Cathlán), Regiment (Reisimint))		Ceathrúsháirsint Cathláin/Reisimint		Sáirsint Complachta (Note: Battery (Ceallraí) in the Artillery. Squadron (Scuadrún) in the Cavalry.)	Ceathrúsháirsint Complachta	Sáirsint	Ceannaire		Saighdiúr Singil, 3 Réalta	Saighdiúr Singil, 2 Réalta	Earcach
Jamaican Army											No insignia
Jamaican Army	Warrant officer class 1		Warrant officer class 2		Staff sergeant	Sergeant		Corporal		Lance corporal	Private (or equivalent)
Kenya Army											No insignia
Kenya Army	Warrant officer class 1		Warrant officer class 2		Senior sergeant	Sergeant		Corporal		Lance corporal	Private (or equivalent)
Kiribati	No army
Lesotho Army											No insignia
Lesotho Army	Warrant officer class 1		Warrant officer class 2		Staff sergeant	Sergeant		Corporal		Lance corporal	Private (or equivalent)
Liberian Ground Forces												No insignia
Liberian Ground Forces	Command sergeant major		Master sergeant		Sergeant first class	Staff sergeant	Sergeant	Corporal		Private first class	Private	Private
Malawi Army											No insignia
Malawi Army	Warrant Officer Class 1		Warrant Officer Class 2		Staff Sergeant	Sergeant		Corporal		Lance Corporal	Private (or equivalent)
Army of Malta											No insignia
Army of Malta	Warrant officer class 1		Warrant officer class 2		Staff sergeant	Sergeant		Bombardier		Lance bombardier	Gunner (or equivalent)
Marshall Islands	No army
Mauritius	No army
Federated States of Micronesia	No army
Namibian Army											No insignia
Namibian Army	Warrant officer class 1		Warrant officer class 2		Staff sergeant	Sergeant		Corporal		Lance corporal	Private (or equivalent)
Nauru	No army
New Zealand Army												No insignia
New Zealand Army	Warrant officer class 1		Warrant officer class 2		Staff sergeant	Sergeant		Corporal		Lance corporal		Private (or equivalent)
Nigerian Army											No insignia
Nigerian Army	Army warrant officer	Master warrant officer	Warrant officer		Staff sergeant	Sergeant		Corporal		Lance corporal	Private (or equivalent)
Pakistan Army											No insignia
Pakistan Army	Subedar-major صوبیدار میجر		Subedar صوبیدار		Naib subedar نائب صوبیدار	Havildar حوالدار		Naik نائیک		Lance naik لانس نائیک	Sepoy سپاہی
Palau	No army
Papua New Guinea Land Element											No insignia
Papua New Guinea Land Element	Warrant officer class 1 ?		Warrant officer class 2 ?		Staff sergeant Plag Sajen	Sergeant; Sajen		Corporal; Kopul		Lance corporal Lans Kopul	Private; Praivet
Philippine Army
Philippine Army	Chief master sergeant	Senior master sergeant	Master sergeant		Technical sergeant	Staff sergeant	Sergeant	Corporal			Private first class	Private
Rwandan Land Forces												No insignia
Rwandan Land Forces	Warrant officer I		Warrant officer II		Sergeant major	Staff sergeant	Sergeant			Corporal		Private
SKN Regiment											No insignia
SKN Regiment	Warrant officer 1		Warrant officer 2		Staff sergeant	Sergeant		Corporal		Lance corporal	Private
Saint Lucia	No army
Saint Vincent and the Grenadines	No army
Samoa	No army
Seychelles Infantry Unit											No insignia
Seychelles Infantry Unit	Warrant officer class 1		Warrant officer class 2		Staff sergeant	Sergeant		Corporal		Lance corporal	Private (or equivalent)
Sierra Leone Army											No insignia
Sierra Leone Army	Warrant officer class 1		Warrant officer class 2		Staff sergeant	Sergeant		Corporal		Lance corporal	Private (or equivalent)
Singapore Army												No insignia	No insignia
Singapore Army	Master sergeant		Staff sergeant		First sergeant	Second sergeant	Third sergeant	Corporal first class	Corporal	Lance corporal	Private first class	Private	Recruit
Solomon Islands	No army
South African Army											No insignia
South African Army	Warrant officer class 1		Warrant officer class 2		Staff sergeant	Sergeant		Corporal		Lance corporal	Private (or equivalent)
South Sudan Army
South Sudan Army	Regimental sergeant major		Sergeant major			Sergeant		Corporal		Lance corporal	Private
Sudanese Army											No insignia
Sudanese Army			مساعد; Mosa'id		رقيب أول; Raqib awwal	رقيب; Raqib		عريف 'arif		وكيل عريف; Wakil 'arif	جندي; Jundiun
Tanzanian Army											No insignia
Tanzanian Army	Afisa mteule daraja la kwanza		Afisa mteule daraja la pili		Sajinitaji	Sajenti		Koplo		Koplo usu	Mtu ndege
Tongan Land Component											No insignia
Tongan Land Component	Warrant officer class 1		Warrant officer class 2		Staff sergeant	Sergeant		Corporal		Lance corporal	Private (or equivalent)
Tongan Land Component	'Ofisa Fakamafai Kalasi 1		'Ofisa Fakamafai Kalasi 2		Sitafu satini	Satini		Kopila		Lani kopila	Palaiveti
Trinidad and Tobago Regiment											No insignia
Trinidad and Tobago Regiment	Warrant officer class 1		Warrant officer class 2		Staff sergeant	Sergeant		Corporal		Lance corporal	Private
Tuvalu	No army
Ugandan Land Forces											No insignia
Ugandan Land Forces	Warrant officer class 1		Warrant officer class 2		Staff sergeant	Sergeant		Corporal		Lance corporal	Private (or equivalent)
British Army											No insignia
British Army	Warrant officer class 1		Warrant officer class 2		Staff/Colour sergeant	Sergeant		Corporal		Lance corporal	Private (or equivalent)
United States Army												No insignia
United States Army	Command sergeant major	Sergeant major	First sergeant	Master sergeant	Sergeant first class	Staff sergeant	Sergeant	Corporal	Specialist	Private first class	Private	Private
Vanuatu Mobile Forces
Vanuatu Mobile Forces	Warrant Officer; Class 1		Warrant Officer; Class 2		Staff Sergeant; Staf Sajen	Sergeant; Sajen		Corporal; Kofol		Lance Corporal	Constable; Polis	Recruit; Rikrut
Zambian Army											No insignia
Zambian Army	Warrant officer class 1		Warrant officer class 2		Staff sergeant	Sergeant		Corporal		Lance corporal	Private (or equivalent)
Zimbabwe National Army											No insignia
Zimbabwe National Army	Regimental sergeant major	Warrant officer class 1	Warrant officer class 2		Staff sergeant	Sergeant		Corporal		Lance corporal	Private (or equivalent)
Rank group	Senior NCOs							Junior NCOs			Enlisted
