= Army Reserve =

Army Reserve refers to a land-based military reserve force, including:

- Army Reserve (Ireland)
- Army Reserve (United Kingdom)
- Australian Army Reserve
- Canadian Army Reserve
- New Zealand Army Reserve
- United States Army Reserve
- United States Navy Reserve
- United States Air Force Reserve
- United States Marine Corps Reserve
