= List of equipment of the Irish Army =

This is a list of equipment of the Irish Army, the land component of the Irish Defence Forces.

== Small arms ==
=== Standard issue weapons ===
| Name | Origin | Type | Calibre | Image | Notes |
Handguns
| Heckler & Koch USP | Germany | Semi-automatic pistol | 9×19mm Parabellum | | Standard issue pistol. Entered service in 2007. Replaced the Browning Hi-Power which served since 1963. |
Assault rifles
| Steyr AUG MOD 14 (MODel 2014) | Austria | Assault rifle | 5.56×45mm NATO | | Standard issue assault rifle. Entered service in 1989, replacing FN FAL (which served 1961-1989) and Carl Gustaf m/45 (which served 1955-1989). Equipped (since 2014 upgrade; originally Irish AUGs had 1.5x fixed scope)) with ACOG 4x32 optical sight. |
Precision rifles
| FN FAL | Belgium | Designated marksman rifle (DMR) | 7.62×51mm NATO | | The FN FAL was previously the standard service rifle for the Defence Forces (replacing Lee-Enfield Rifle No.4 in 1961), being replaced by Steyr AUG in 1989 (but used by Irish reserve forces until the early 2000s). Older FAL rifles were upgraded with an adjustable butt stock, Picatinny-style rail hand guard, a bipod, and a Schmidt & Bender sight for use as sniper support weapons, re-entering Irish service as DMR in 2011.In January 2021, the Defence Forces stated a replacement was being sought. |
| Heckler & Koch HK417 G28 | Germany | Designated marksman rifle (DMR) | 7.62x51mm NATO | | The HK G28 was selected in October 2026 to become the new DMR for the Irish Army. The rifle will replace existing FN FAL rifles and will feature a Schmidt & Bender 3-20×50 scope as well as a bipod and forward grip. The procurement is set to cost roughly €8 Million with around 374 rifles procured in total. |
| Accuracy International 92 | United Kingdom | Bolt action sniper rifle | 7.62×51mm NATO | | Entered service in 1992. |
| Accuracy International AWM | United Kingdom | Bolt action sniper rifle | 8.6×70mm (.338 LM) | | Entered service in 2011. |
Machine guns
| FN MAG | Belgium | General-purpose machine gun | 7.62×51mm NATO | | Entered service in 1964. Used with a bipod or in the sustained fire (SF) role with a tripod. Also possible to use with C2A1 sight (like the mortars). |
| M2 Browning .5 Heavy Machine Gun (HMG) | United States; Belgium | Heavy machine gun | 12.7×99mm NATO (.50 BMG) | | Entered service in the 1970s. Used in sustained fire and air defence roles. |
Grenades
| Mecar M72 HE Grenade | Belgium | Fragmentation hand grenade | n/a | | |
Grenade launchers
| Diemaco M203 grenade launcher | Canada | Under-barrel grenade launcher | 40×46mm LV | | Mounted to Steyr AUG rifle. |
| Heckler & Koch GMG | Germany | Automatic grenade launcher | 40×53mm HV | | Fitted to MOWAG APCs and Army Ranger Wing vehicles. |
Anti-tank weapons
| AT4 Short Range Anti-Armour Weapon (SRAAW) | Sweden | Recoilless gun | 84mm | | Entered service in 1997. |
| Carl Gustav 84mm Anti-Armour Weapon | Sweden | Recoilless rifle | 84mm | | |
| Javelin Anti-tank guided weapon | United States | Anti-tank guided missile | 127mm | | Entered service in 2003. CLUs and 36 missiles acquired in 2006. 36 CLUs and 44 missiles bought in 2025. |

=== Army Ranger Wing weapons (special forces) ===
| Name | Origin | Type | Calibre | Image | Notes |
Handguns
| H&K USP9 Tactical | Germany | Semi-automatic pistol | 9×19mm Parabellum | | |
| SIG Sauer P226 | Switzerland; West Germany | Semi-automatic pistol | 9×19mm Parabellum | | |
| SIG Sauer P228 | Switzerland; West Germany | Semi-automatic pistol | 9×19mm Parabellum | | |
| FN Five-seveN | Belgium | Semi-automatic pistol | FN 5.7×28mm | | |
Submachine guns
| Heckler & Koch MP5 | West Germany | Submachine gun | 9×19mm Parabellum | | A3, SD6, F, and K variants |
| FN P90TR | Belgium | Submachine gun | FN 5.7×28mm | | |
Assault rifles & battle rifles
| Steyr AUG A2 | Austria | Assault rifle | 5.56×45mm NATO | | ACOG 4×32 optical sights |
| Steyr AUG A3 | Austria | Assault rifle | 5.56×45mm NATO | | ACOG 4×32 optical sights |
| Heckler & Koch HK416 | Germany | Assault rifle | 5.56×45mm NATO | | |
| Heckler & Koch HK417 RECCE | Germany | Battle rifle | 7.62×51mm NATO | | |
Precision rifles
| Heckler & Koch HK417 Sniper | Germany | Designated marksman rifle | 7.62×51mm NATO | | |
| Accuracy International 92 | United Kingdom | Bolt action sniper rifle | 7.62×51mm NATO | | |
| Accuracy International AWM | United Kingdom | Bolt action sniper rifle | 8.6×70mm (.338 LM) | | |
| Accuracy International AW50 | United Kingdom | Anti-materiel rifle | 12.7×99mm NATO (.50 BMG) | | |
Machine guns
| FN Minimi Para | Belgium | Light machine gun | 5.56×45mm NATO | | |
Shotguns
| Benelli M4 | Italy | Pump action shotgun | 12 gauge | | |

== Indirect fire ==
| Name | Origin | Type | Calibre | Number | Image | Notes |
Mortars
| Denel Vektor M1 60mm Mortar | South Africa | Mortar | 60mm | | | Entered service in 2003. Can use similar sight and fire control computer as 81mm mortar. Also configurable as a commando mortar. |
| Hotchkiss Brandt 81mm Mortar | France | Mortar | 81mm | 84 | | Uses the C2 AI Sight Unit and a Morfire Fire Control Computer. |
| RUAG M87 120mm Mortar | Switzerland | Mortar | 120mm | 24 | | Entered service in 2008. Used by Artillery Regiments heavy mortar batteries. |
Artillery
| 105mm L118 light gun | United Kingdom | Howitzer | 105mm | 17 | | Along with the L119, these are used as the primary artillery support weapon. |
| 105mm L119 light gun | United Kingdom | Howitzer | 105mm | 6 | | Along with the L118, these are used as the primary artillery support weapon. |
Ceremonial guns
| Ordnance QF 25-pounder | United Kingdom | Field gun | 87.6mm | 6 | | 48 ex-British Mark IIIs acquired in 1949. Withdrawn from the Army in 1981 and from the Reserve in 2009. Used for ceremonial gun salutes only. |
| QF 12-pounder 12 cwt gun | United Kingdom | Naval gun/Coastal artillery | 76.2mm | 10 | | These former coastal artillery guns are used, in two fixed saluting batteries, for ceremonial gun salutes only. Four are in Cork Harbour at Fort Mitchel, Spike Island, County Cork. A further six are in Dún Laoghaire Harbour, County Dublin. |

== Vehicles ==
| Name | Origin | Type | Number | Image | Notes |
Armoured fighting vehicles
| Mowag Piranha IIIH | Switzerland | Armoured personnel carrier Armoured reconnaissance vehicle | 80 (2021) | | Introduced in 2001.: 45 APC (equipped with a manned turret equipped with a M2 Browning and a FN MAG); 18 CRV (Close Reconnaissance Vehicles with Protector RWS equipped with M2 Browning or Heckler & Koch GMG; 9 armoured personnel carriers were converted to close reconnaissance vehicles in 2014–2015); 8 command vehicles (equipped with a manned turret equipped with a M2 Browning and a FN MAG); 6 MRV (Medium Reconnaissance Vehicles with Hitfist-30 turret and Mk44 Bushmaster II 30mm autocannon); 2 ambulances; 1 recovery vehicle; A mid-life upgrade (MLU) was completed in 2025. |
Army Ranger Wing (special forces)
| ACMAT VLRA | France | Tactical support trucks | 3 | | |
| Ford F350 SRV | United States | Special reconnaissance vehicle | 12 | | Left hand drive. |
General service vehicles
| Toyota Landcruiser | Japan | Off-road vehicle | 280 | | 280 ordered for delivery 2019-2023. Replacing older vehicles. |
| Toyota Landcruiser /Centigon Fortress 200 Intervention | Japan | Off-road vehicle | 52 | | Armoured Utility Vehicle AUV. 24 ordered in 2018. 28 ordered in 2020 |
| Nissan Patrol | Japan | Off-road vehicle | 38 | | The Defence Forces maintains a small fleet of 'discreet' armoured SUVs for high-risk and IED-threat missions. |
| Mitsubishi Pajero | Japan | Off-road vehicle | 32 | | 32 Mitsubishi Pajero vehicles are fitted for radio (FFR) - VHF. |
| Isuzu D-Max | Japan | Off-road vehicle | — | | |
| Ford Ranger | United States | Off-road vehicle | — | | 20 donated to Ukraine in 2024. 16 donated to Ukraine in 2025. |
| Suzuki DR350 | Japan | Motorcycle | — | | |
| Suzuki DRZ-400 | Japan | Motorcycle | — | | |
| Yamaha Grizzly 660 | Japan | ATV / Quad | — | | |
Troop carrying vehicle
| Iveco EuroCargo 4x4 | Italy | Troop carrying vehicle | 70 | | |
| Mercedes-Benz 1117 4x4 | Germany | Troop carrying vehicle | 60 | | |
| Scania P 370B 4x4 | Sweden | Troop carrying vehicle | 120 | | 120 ordered for delivery 2020-2023. Replacing older 4x4 troop carriers |
| Scania R 420 6x6 | Sweden | Troop carrying vehicle | 36 | | 36 ordered in 2006. |
| Scania R 420 8x4 | Sweden | Miscellaneous | 2 | | Delivered 2006. One in naval service |
| EOD Duro II 6x6 | Switzerland | Tactical military lorry (truck) | 6 | | Delivered 2003 |
| Leyland DAF T244 4x4 | United Kingdom | Artillery gun tractor and troop carrying vehicle | 55 | | |
| Ford Transit Minibus | United States | Minibus | — | | 8 donated to Ukraine. |
Logistics
| Iveco Astra M320.42 W BAD 8×8 DROPS | Italy | DROPS truck | 21 | | One fitted with an EKALIFT 2500 recovery body. |
| Scania P124CB 8×8 DROPS | Sweden | DROPS truck | 15 | | Tender for 20 new DROPS vehicles issued in 2021. 5 donated to Ukraine. |
| EMPL EH/W 200 Bison on Scania truck | Sweden / Austria | Recovery truck | 2 | | |
Explosive Ordnance Disposal
| MAN HX60 | Germany | Armoured EOD trucks | 3 or more | | Initially Delivered 2011. Two additional ordered 2016. |
| Aardvark MK4 | United Kingdom | Mine flail | — | | |
| Mowag Duro II | Switzerland | Explosive ordnance disposal vehicle | 6 | | |
Ceremonial vehicles
| Rolls Royce armoured car | United Kingdom | Armoured car | 1 | | ARR-2 Sliabh na mBan. The sole remaining example of thirteen vehicles. Was part of the convoy ambushed at Béal na mBláth where General Michael Collins, Commander in Chief of the National Army, was killed during the Irish Civil War. Currently used for ceremonial purposes, and also the world's oldest active serving armoured vehicle. |
| Land Rover Defender | United Kingdom | Off-road vehicle | — | | Field ambulances and funeral gun carriage tractor. 2 funeral vehicles to be modified into electric vehicles. |
| Honda NC750X | Japan | Motorcycle | 48 | | Purchased in 2019 to be used by 2nd Cavalry Squadron to provide a ceremonial escort for the President and other dignitaries. |

== Air defence ==
| Name | Origin | Type | Number | Image | Notes |
|---|---|---|---|---|---|
| RBS-70 Missile system | Sweden | Man-portable air-defense system | >12 (as of 2014) | | A number of launchers and a simulator were acquired in 1981. Upgraded in 2006 and "more than a dozen" upgraded in 2014 for €4.4 million to include deliveries of improved firing units, new simulators, night vision equipment and associated weapons support. Upgraded with BOLIDE missiles. |
| MBDA Sky Warden | France | Counter-drone system | 1 | | 1 system received for €20 million, operational since at least July 2026 |

== Unmanned aerial vehicles ==
| Name | Origin | Type | Number | Image | Notes |
|---|---|---|---|---|---|
| Aeronautics Orbiter UAV | Israel | Miniature UAV | 14 (as of 2016) | | Used by Artillery Corps. Two systems were acquired in 2006 each system has 3 Orbiter UAVs. Two were destroyed in crashes and one was lost and never recovered. €2m was spent on 12 new UAVs in 2016/17. |

== On order ==
| Name | Origin | Type | Number | Image | Notes |
|---|---|---|---|---|---|
| Thales GM 400α | France | Long range radar | 4 | | Delivery expected from 2027 |
| Thales GM 200MM/A | France | Medium range radar | 1 | | Delivery expected from 2027 |

== Gallery ==
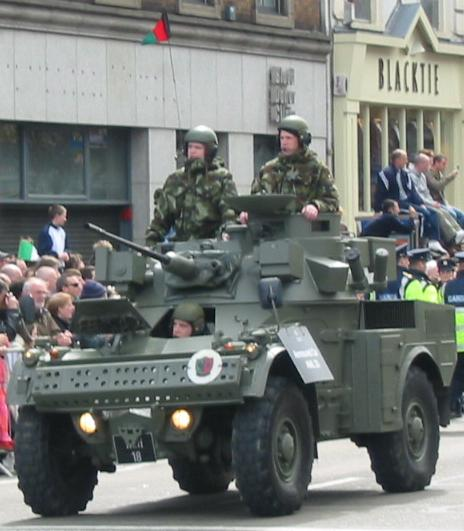
The remaining Panhard AML-20 armoured cars were retired in 2013

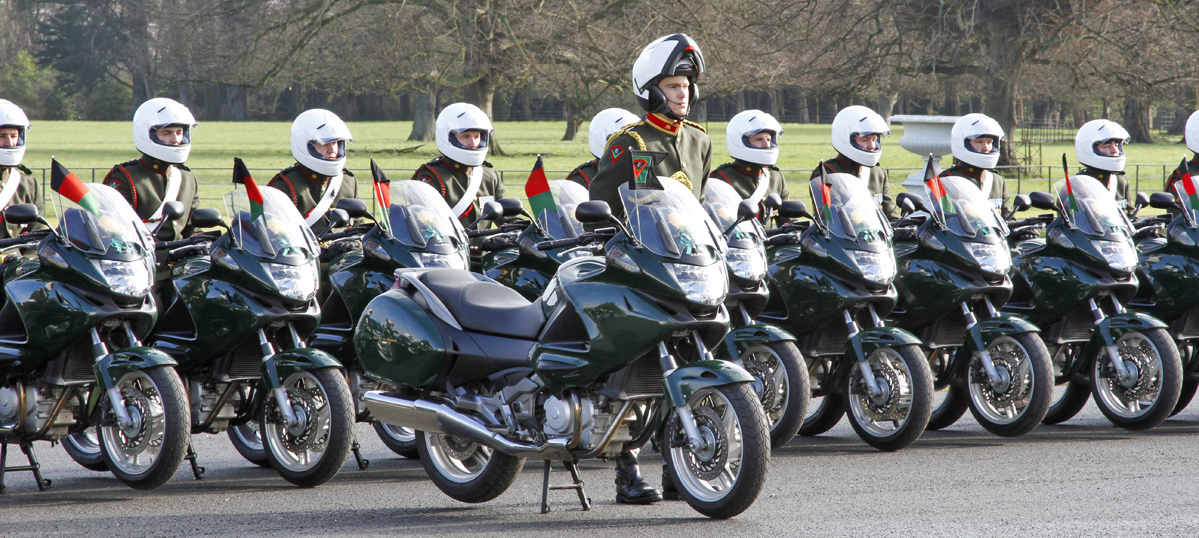
Honda ceremonial escort motorcycles of 2 Cavalry Squadron

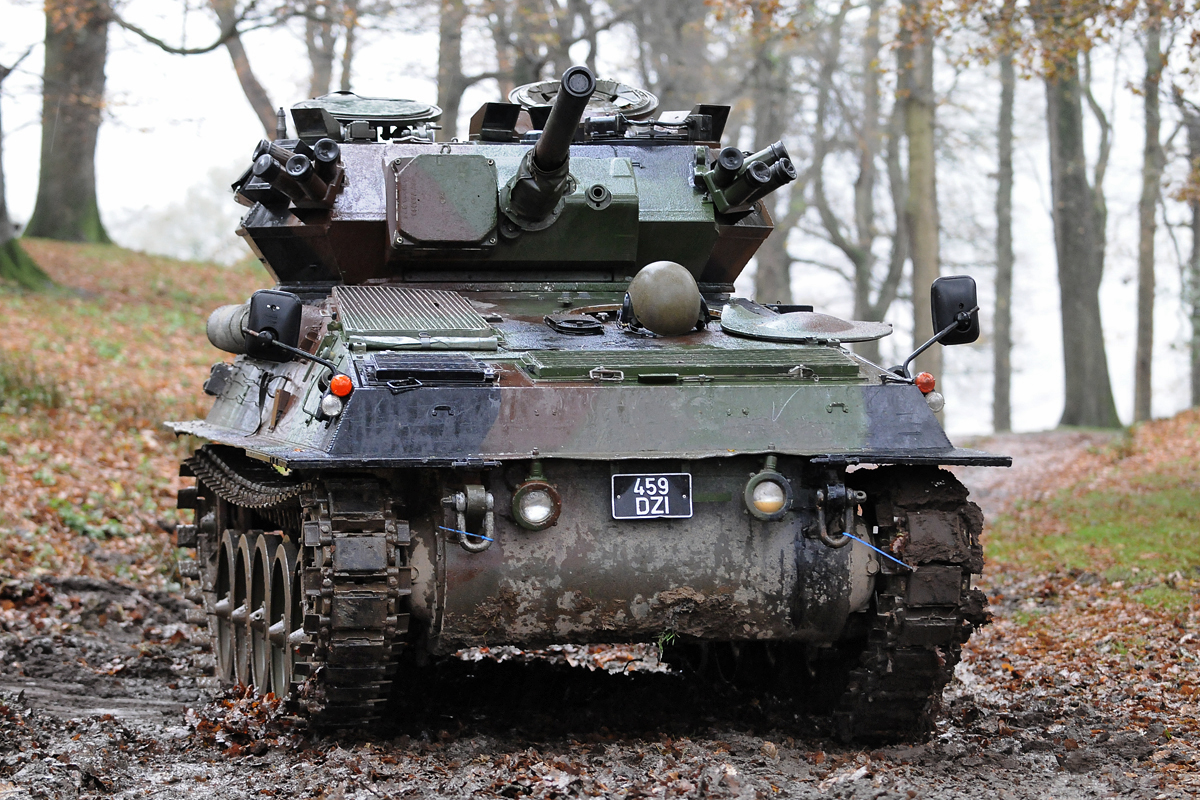
14 Scorpion CVR(T) tracked reconnaissance vehicles were in use from the 1980s until their retirement in 2017.

== See also ==
- Modern Irish Army uniform
- Armoured fighting vehicles of the Irish Army
