= Transport Corps (Ireland) =

Irish Army Transport Corps
- Irish: An Cór Iompair
- Country: Ireland
- Branch: Army
- Type: Military transport & logistics
- Part of: Defence Forces
- Website: www.military.ie/en/who-we-are/army/army-corps/transport-corps/
- Abbreviation: TPT

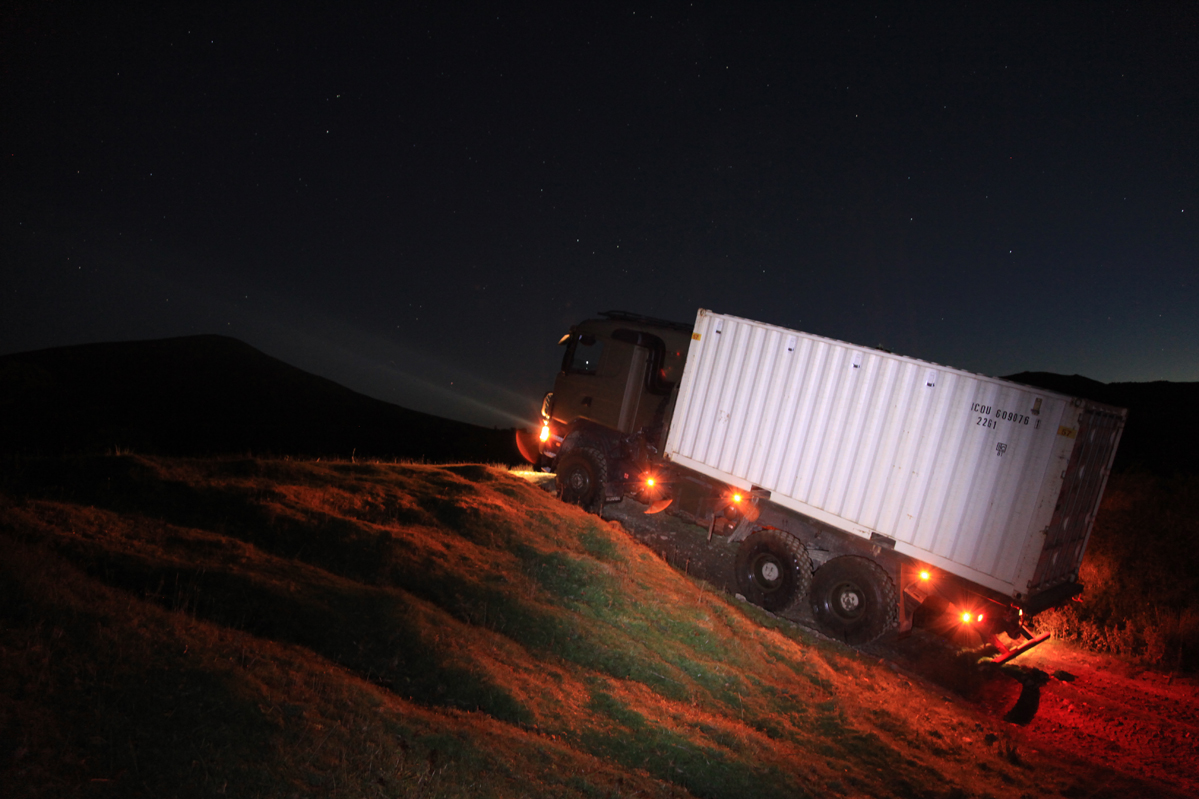
Irish Army Transport Corps logistics lift at night

The Transport Corps (TPT) (Irish: An Cór Iompair) is a combat service support corps of the Irish Army, a branch of the Defence Forces of Ireland.

The role of the Transport Corps is to provide the Defence Forces with a heavy lift transport and logistics capability. It is responsible for the acquisition and maintenance of all soft skinned vehicles, the maintenance of all armoured vehicles within the Army, and the provision of vehicle fuels, oils and lubricants. The Corps also oversees driving standards within the Defence Forces, including driver training, testing and certification.

== Field Transport Company ==
The Field Transport Company provides transport lift and logistics support for the Infantry Corps. The company provides supplies of Petroleum, Oil, & Lubricants ("POL"), ammunition and rations as well as second line transport maintenance, repair and recovery for infantry units.

== Transport Vehicle Maintenance School ==
The Transport Vehicle Maintenance School (TVMS) is a school within the Defence Forces Training Centre (DFTC) and subordinate to the Directorate of Transport. The Transport School is responsible for the training, education and technical upskilling of Defence Forces personnel in all areas of driving and maintenance of vehicles for use domestically and overseas. The TVMS works closely with organisations outside the military to ensure best practice.

== See also ==
- List of equipment of the Irish Army
- Armoured fighting vehicles of the Irish Army
