= Irish Defence Forces rank insignia =

Rank insignia in the Irish Defence Forces are an indication of the wearer's military rank, and worn by officers and enlisted members of Ireland's Defence Forces as an element of their uniform, typically on a single chest tab or as a shoulder board.

== Irish Army ==
Officers

| Rank group | General / flag officers | | | | Senior officers | | | Junior officers |
|---|---|---|---|---|---|---|---|---|---|---|
| Combat |
| Irish Army |
| Irish Army | | Lieutenant-general | Major-general | Brigadier-general | Colonel | Lieutenant-colonel | Commandant | Captain | Lieutenant | Second-Lieutenant |
| Irish Army | | Lefteanant-ghinearál | Maor-ghinearál | Briogáidire-ghinearál | Cornal | Lefteanant-chornal | Ceannfort | Captaen | Lefteanant | Dara-lefteanant |
| Abbreviation | | Lt Gen | Maj Gen | Brig Gen | Col | Lt Col | Comdt | Capt | Lt | 2nd Lt |
| Equivalent NATO code (Note: While Ireland is not a member of NATO, it does have an official conversion.) | OF-9 | OF-8 | OF-7 | OF-6 | OF-5 | OF-4 | OF-3 | OF-2 | OF-1 |

Other ranks

| Rank group | Non-commissioned officer | | | | | | Enlisted |
|---|---|---|---|---|---|---|---|---|---|
| Combat | | | | | | | | | No insignia |
| Irish Army | | | | | | | | | No insignia |
| Irish Army | Sergeant major | Regimental Quartermaster Sergeant | Company sergeant | Company quartermaster sergeant | Sergeant | Corporal | Private, 3 star | Private, 2 star | Recruit |
| Irish Army | Maor-Sáirsint Cathláin/Reisimint (Note: Battalion (Cathlán), Regiment (Reisimint)) | Ceathrúsháirsint Cathláin/Reisimint | Sáirsint Complachta (Note: Battery (Ceallraí) in the Artillery. Squadron (Scuadrún) in the Cavalry.) | Ceathrúsháirsint Complachta | Sáirsint | Ceannaire | Saighdiúir Singil, 3 Réalta | Saighdiúir Singil, 2 Réalta | Earcach |
| Abbreviation | BSM/RSM | BQMS/RQMS | CS/BS/SS | CQ/BQ/SQ | Sgt | Cpl | Pte/Gnr/Tpr 3* | Pte 2* | Rec |
| Equivalent NATO code | OR-9 | OR-8 | OR-7 | OR-6 | OR-5 | OR-4 | OR-3 | OR-2 | OR-1 |

=== Historic ranks ===
==== Commissioned officer ranks ====
The rank insignia of commissioned officers.

| Rank group | General / flag officers | | | | | Senior officers | | | | Junior officers |
|---|---|---|---|---|---|---|---|---|---|---|---|---|
| 1922 |
| 1922 | General | | Major-general | Commandant general (GHQ) | Commandant general (DIV) | Colonel commandant | Brigadier | Commandant | Lieutenant commandant | Captain | First lieutenant | Second lieutenant |
| 1923 |
| 1923 | General | Lieutenant-general | Major-general | | | Colonel | | Commandant | | Captain | First lieutenant | Second lieutenant |
| 1924–1942 |
| 1924–1942 | General | Lieutenant-general | Major-general | | | Colonel | | Major | Commandant | Captain | Lieutenant | Second lieutenant |
| 1942–1944 |
| 1942–1944 | | Lieutenant-general | Major-general | | | Colonel | | Major | Commandant | Captain | Lieutenant | Second lieutenant |
| 1944–1971 |
| 1944–1971 | | Lieutenant-general | Major-general | | | Colonel | | Major | Commandant | Captain | Lieutenant | Second lieutenant |
| Rank group | General / flag officers | | | | | Senior officers | | | | Junior officers |

==== Other ranks ====
The rank insignia of non-commissioned officers and enlisted personnel.

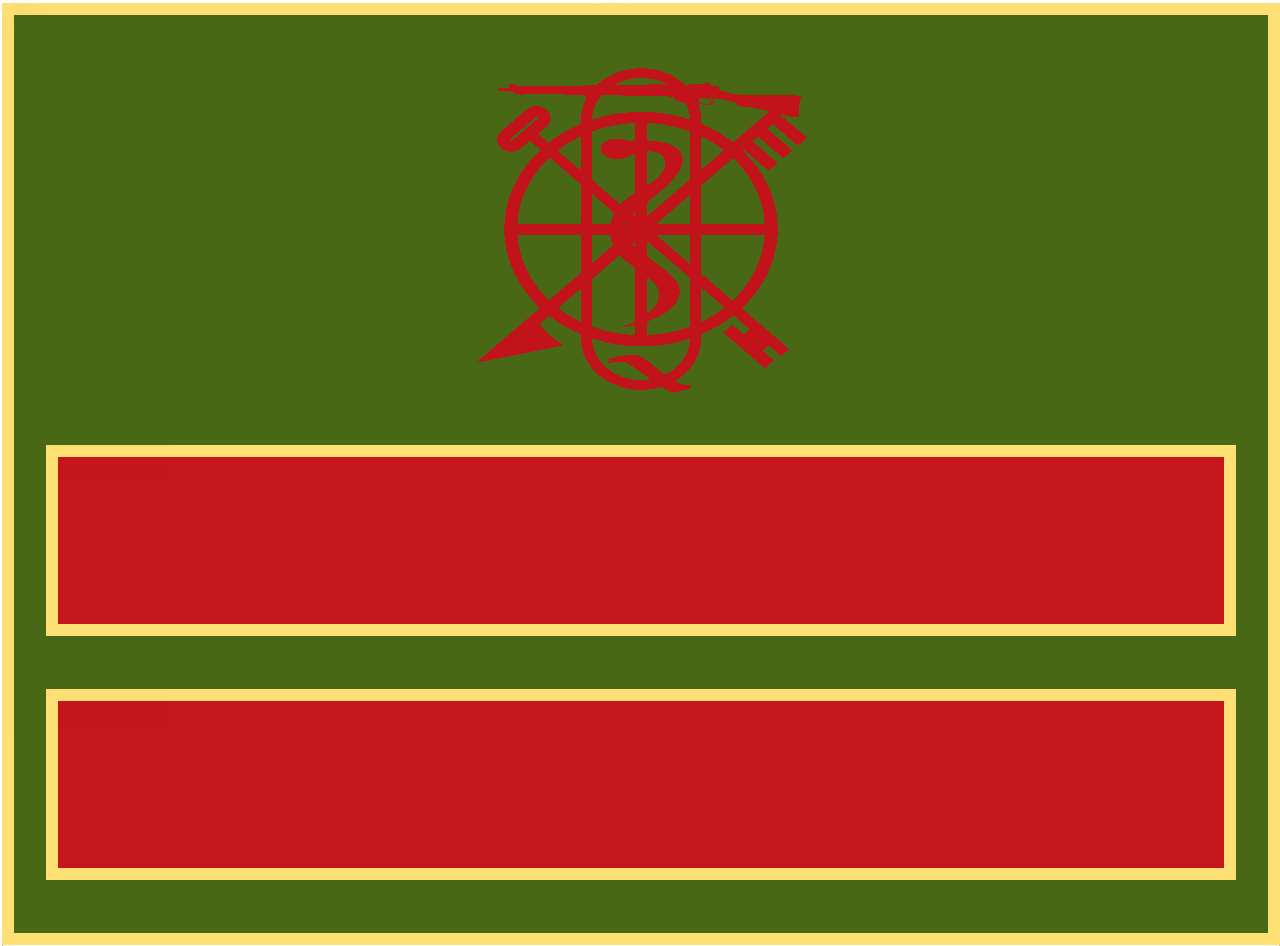
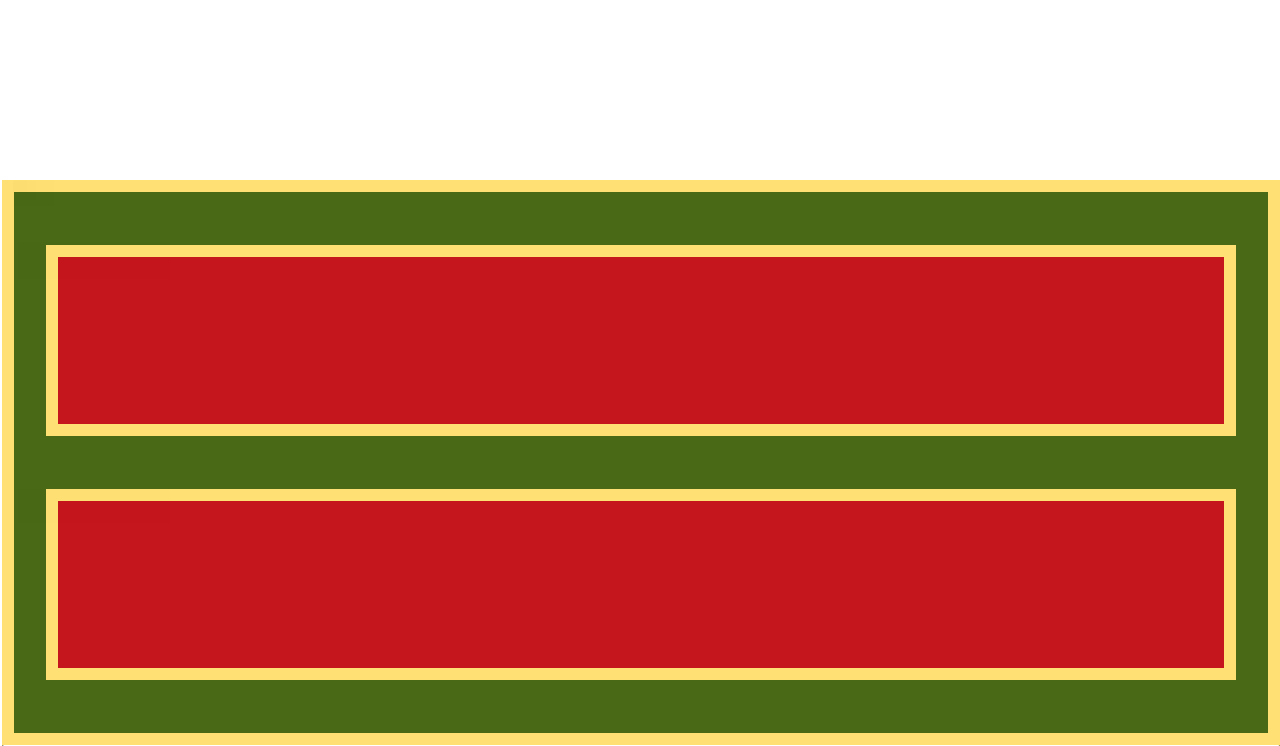
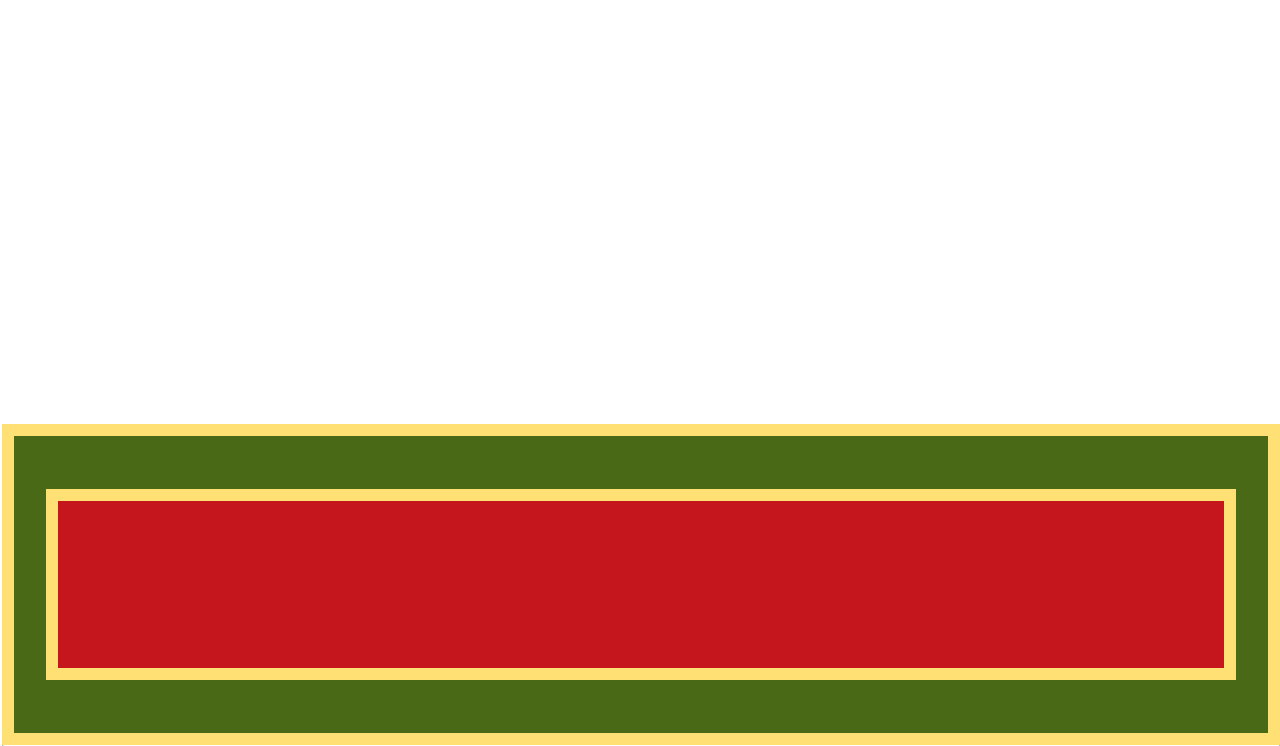
| Rank group | Non-commissioned officer | | | | | | | Enlisted |
|---|---|---|---|---|---|---|---|---|---|---|
| 1922 | | | | | | | | | | No insignia |
| 1922 | Sergeant-Major | | | | Sergeant | Corporal | | | | Volunteer |
| 1923 | | | | | | | | | | No insignia |
| 1923 | | | | | Sergeant | Corporal | | | | Private |
| 1924–1949 | | | | | | | | | | No insignia |
| 1924–1949 | Sergeant-major | Battalion quartermaster sergeant | Company sergeant | Company quartermaster sergeant | Sergeant | Corporal | | | | Private |
| 1949–1963 |
| Abbreviation | BSM/RSM | BQMS/RQMS | BS/CS/SS | BQ/CQ/SQ | Sgt | Cpl, 2 Star | Cpl, 1 Star | Pte, 3 Star | Pte, 2 Star | Pte, 1 Star |
| 1963 | | | | | | | | | | No insignia |
| Abbreviation | BSM/RSM | BQMS/RQMS | BS/CS/SS | BQ/CQ/SQ | Sgt | Cpl, 2 Star | Cpl, 1 Star | Pte, 3 Star | Pte, 2 Star | Pte |

== Irish Air Corps ==
Irish Air Corps rank insignia are an indication of the wearer's military rank, and worn by officers and enlisted members of the Irish Air Corps as an element of their uniform.

Officers

| Rank group | General / flag officers | | | | Senior officers | | | Junior officers |
|---|---|---|---|---|---|---|---|---|---|---|
| Irish Air Corps |
| Irish Air Corps | General | Lieutenant-general | Major-general | Brigadier-general | Colonel | Lieutenant-colonel | Commandant | Captain | Lieutenant | Second-lieutenant |
| Irish Air Corps | Ginearál | Lefteanant-ghinearál | Maor-ghinearál | Briogáidire-ghinearál | Cornal | Lefteanant-chornal | Ceannfort | Captaen | Lefteanant | Dara-lefteanant |
| Abbreviation | Gen | Lt Gen | Maj Gen | Brig Gen | Col | Lt Col | Comdt | Capt | Lt | 2nd Lt |
| Equivalent NATO code | OF-9 | OF-8 | OF-7 | OF-6 | OF-5 | OF-4 | OF-3 | OF-2 | OF-1 |

Other ranks

| Rank group | Non-commissioned officer | | | | | | Enlisted |
|---|---|---|---|---|---|---|---|---|---|---|
| Irish Air Corps | | | | | | | | | | No insignia |
| Irish Air Corps | Regimental sergeant major | Regimental quartermaster sergeant | Flight sergeant | Flight quartermaster sergeant | Sergeant | Corporal | Airman 3 star | Airman 2 star | Apprentice | Recruit |
| Irish Air Corps | Maor-sáirsint reisiminte | Ceathrúsháirsint reisiminte | Sáirsint eitleoige | Ceathrúsháirsint eitleoige | Sáirsint | Ceannaire | Eitleoir, 3 réalta | Eitleoir, 2 réalta | Printíseach | Earcach |
| Abbreviation | RSM | RQMS | FS | FQMS | Sgt | Cpl | Amn 3* | Amn 2* | App | Rec/G1 |
| Equivalent NATO code | OR-9 | OR-8 | OR-7 | OR-6 | OR-5 | OR-4 | OR-3 | OR-2 | OR-1 |

== Irish Naval Service ==
Officers

| Rank group | General / flag officers | | | | Senior officers | | | Junior officers |
|---|---|---|---|---|---|---|---|---|---|---|
| Irish Naval Service |
| Irish Naval Service | | Vice admiral | Rear admiral | Commodore | Captain | Commander | Lieutenant commander | Lieutenant | Sub-lieutenant | Ensign |
| Irish Naval Service | | Leas-aimiréal | Seach-aimiréal | Ceannasóir | Captaen | Ceannasaí | Lefteanant-cheannasaí | Lefteanant | Fo-lefteanant | Meirgire |
| Equivalent NATO code | OF-9 | OF-8 | OF-7 | OF-6 | OF-5 | OF-4 | OF-3 | OF-2 | OF-1 |

Enlisted

| Rank group | Non-commissioned officer | | | | | | Enlisted |
|---|---|---|---|---|---|---|---|---|---|
| Irish Naval Service | | | | | | | | | No insignia |
| Irish Naval Service | Warrant officer | Senior chief petty officer | Chief petty officer | Senior petty officer | Petty officer | Leading seaman | Able seaman | Ordinary seaman | Seaman recruit |
| Irish Naval Service | Oifigeach barántais | Ard-mhion-oifigeach sinsearach | Ard-mhion-oifigeach | Mion-oifigeach sinsearach | Mion-oifigeach | Mairnéalach ceannais | Mairnéalach inniúil | Mairnéalach | Earcach |
| Equivalent NATO code | OR-9 | OR-8 | OR-7 | OR-6 | OR-5 | OR-4 | OR-3 | OR-2 | OR-1 |

Warrant officer variants

Executive

Administrative

Engineering

Communications

=== Historic ranks ===
Commissioned ranks

| Rank group | General / flag officers | Senior officers | | | Junior officers |
|---|---|---|---|---|---|---|---|
| 1939 |
| 1939 | Commodore | Captain | Commander | Lieutenant commander | Lieutenant | Sub-lieutenant | Ensign |
| 1939 | Ceannasóir | Captaen | Ceannasaí | Lefteanant-cheannasaí | Lefteanant | Fo-lefteanant | Meirgire |

Other ranks

| Rank group | Senior NCOs | | | | | Junior NCOs | | Enlisted |
|---|---|---|---|---|---|---|---|---|---|
| 1939 |
| 1939 | Warrant officer | | Chief petty officer | | Petty officer | Leading seaman | | Ordinary seaman |
| 1939 | Oifigeach barántais | | Ard-mhion-oifigeach | | Mion-oifigeach | Mairnéalach ceannais | | Mairnéalach |
| 1940–1973 |
| 1940–1973 | Warrant officer | Senior chief petty officer | Chief petty officer | Senior petty officer | Petty officer | Leading seaman | | Ordinary seaman |
| 1940–1973 | Oifigeach barántais | Ard-mhion-oifigeach sinsearach | Ard-mhion-oifigeach | Mion-oifigeach sinsearach | Mion-oifigeach | Mairnéalach ceannais | | Mairnéalach |
| –2020 | | | | | | | | | No insignia |
| –2020 | Warrant officer | Senior chief petty officer | Chief petty officer | Senior petty officer | Petty officer | Leading seaman | Able seaman | Ordinary seaman | Seaman recruit |
| –2020 | Oifigeach barántais | Ard-mhion-oifigeach sinsearach | Ard-mhion-oifigeach | Mion-oifigeach sinsearach | Mion-oifigeach | Mairnéalach ceannais | Mairnéalach inniúil | Mairnéalach | Earcach |

=== Naval reserve ===
Prior to 2002 ranks for NCOs in the Naval Reserve were in blue instead of gold.

| Rank group | Non-commissioned officer | | | | | Enlisted |
|---|---|---|---|---|---|---|---|---|
| Irish Naval; Service Reserve (Pre-2002) | | | | | | | | No insignia |
| Irish Naval; Service Reserve (Pre-2002) | Senior chief petty officer Ard-mhion-oifigeach sinsearach | Chief petty officer Ard-mhion-oifigeach | Senior petty officer Mion-oifigeach sinsearach | Petty officer Mion-oifigeach | Leading seaman Mairnéalach ceannais | Able seaman Mairnéalach inniúil | Ordinary seaman Mairnéalach | Seaman recruit Earcach |

== Student officers ==
| Rank group | Student officer |
|---|---|---|
| Irish Army |
| Irish Army | Senior officer cadet Dalta oifigeach sinsearch | Junior officer cadet Dalta oifigeach sóisearach |
| Irish Army | Sr Cdt | Jr Cdt |
| Irish Air Corps |
| Irish Air Corps | Officer cadet Dalta oifigeach |
| Irish Air Corps | O-Cdt |
| Irish Naval Service |
| Irish Naval Service | Officer cadet Dalta Oifigeach |
