= Modern Irish Army uniform =

Military uniform

The modern Irish Army uniform is based on the layer principle, and is designed to provide soldiers in the Irish Army with the right degree of protection for any operational environment.

== Field dress ==
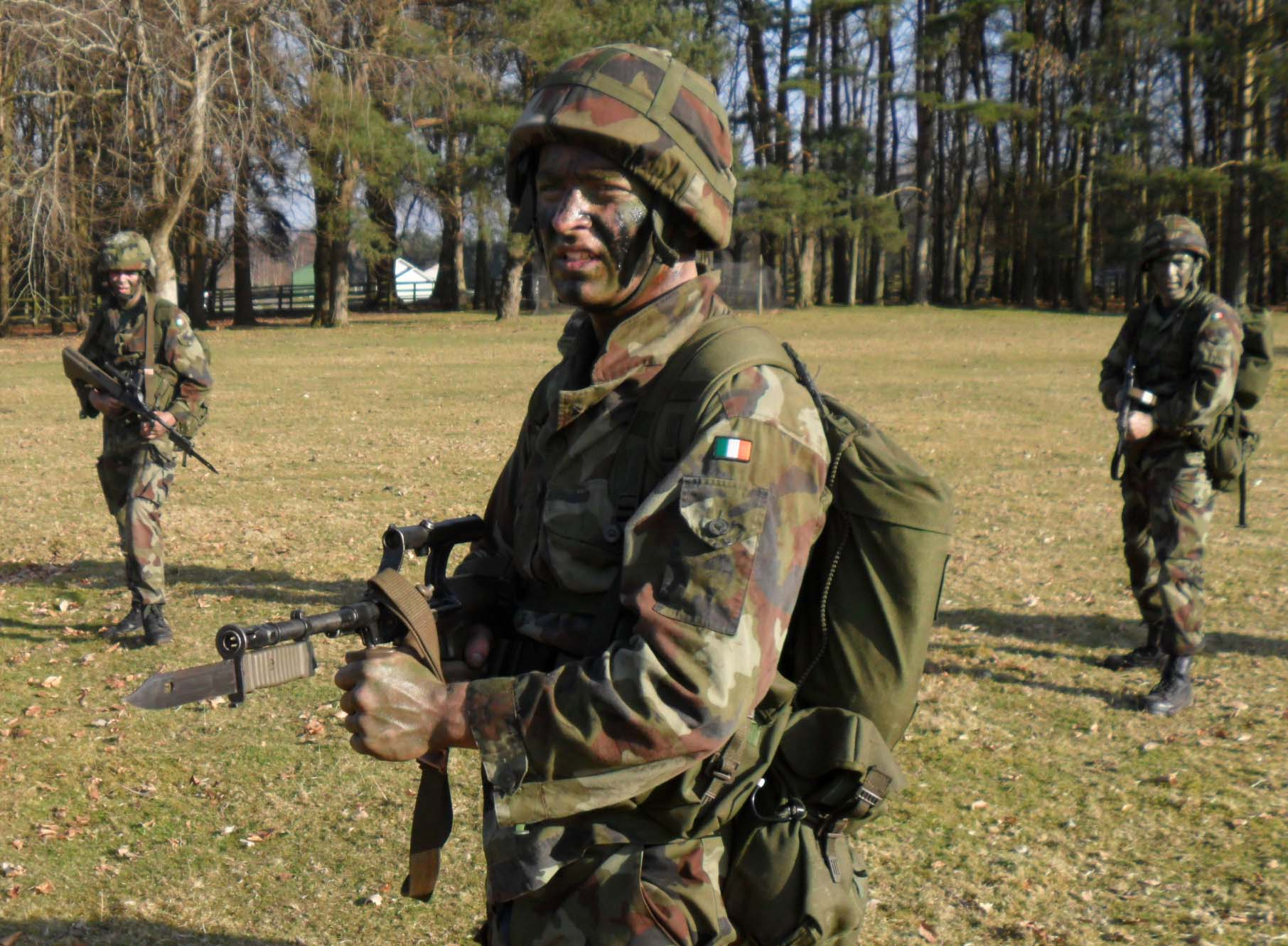
Field dress with Rabintex helmet

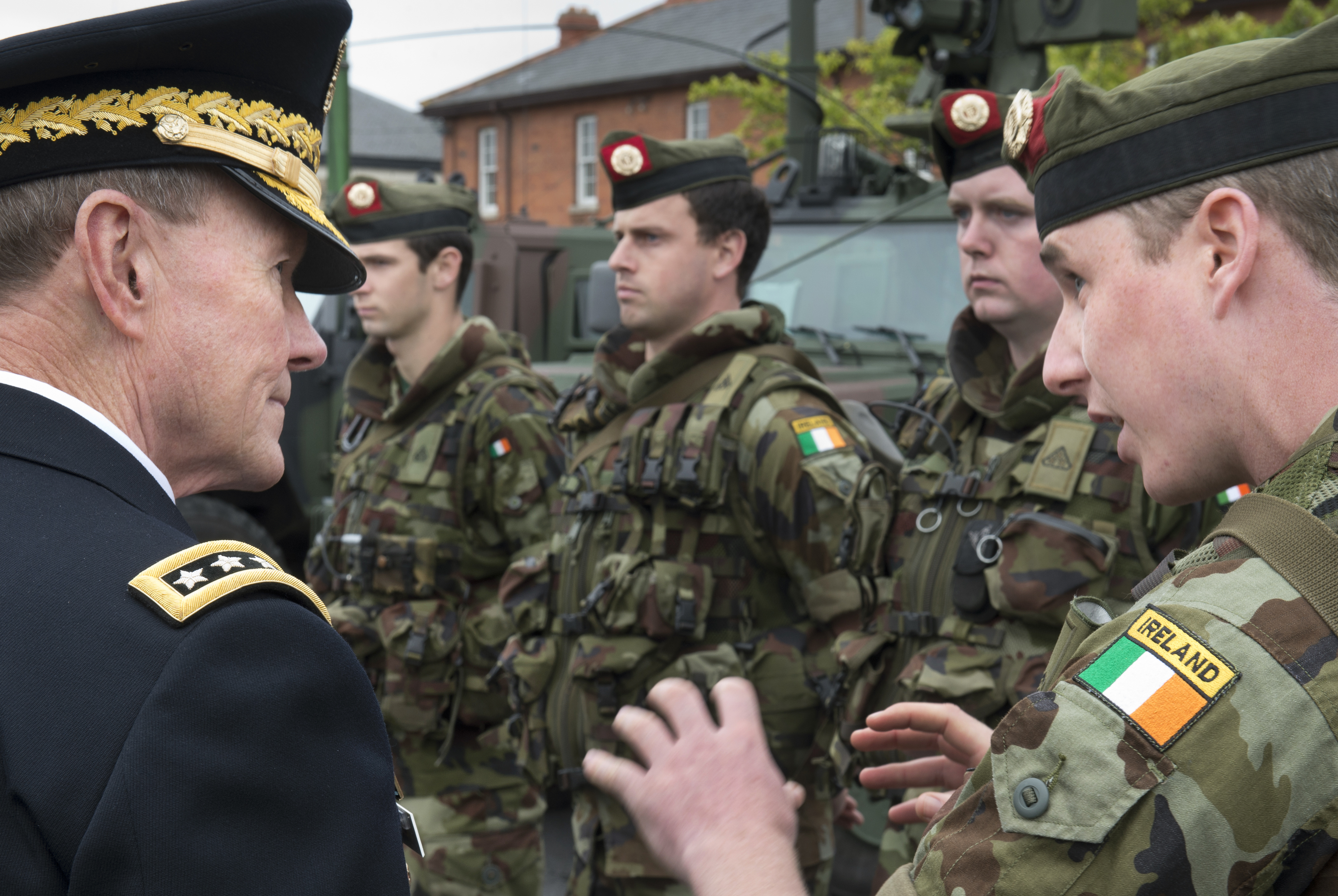
Inspection of Cavalry Corps members in field dress with Glengarry headdress

An Irish Army combat uniform includes a number of disruptively patterned or camouflage patterned elements known as Disruptive Pattern Material (DPM). It consists of the following:

Headwear

- Black beret for regular branches of the army, light green beret for reserves (the RDF light green beret has now been replaced with the black beret to emphasise the single force concept), red beret for Póilíní Airm (military police), commando green beret for Army Ranger Wing. Those serving under the UN wear blue UN berets.
  - Glengarry headdress for Cavalry Corps, and black caubeen for army pipers. The Irish Defence Forces cap badge is usually worn with headdress.
- DPM/Desert DPM waterproof cap (for use in cold weather).
- DPM/UN blue/Desert DPM bush hat.

Outerwear

- DPM shirt – both temperate and desert pattern.(Barracks dress)
- DPM UBACS - (combat shirt) worn with body armour (operational dress)
- DPM smock – combat jacket with hood in both temperate and desert pattern.
- DPM rainsuit – breathable material, temperate and desert pattern.
- DPM trousers (tropical all-cotton and polycotton heavyweight versions).
- A velcro cloth name tape is worn on the over the right breast pocket on the outer layer, and a Defence Forces Ireland or Óglaigh na hÉireann patch is positioned over the left breast pocket.

Midlayers

- Summer, winter, and tropical issue socks.
- DPM Driflo baselayers, short and long sleeve tops, trunks and short leggings.
- DPM Norwegian pattern combat shirt.
- DPM softshell operational fleece jacket (barracks dress)
- Hollowfibre "Snugpak" jacket (green/black reversible, operational dress)

Footwear

- Boots barrack light operational (worn in barracks and in warm weather at home and abroad).
- Boots operational (Gore-Tex lined all-leather waterproof, used in cold/wet conditions).

Ancillary items

- DPM Scarf.
- DPM Insulated/waterproof gloves.
- DPM Headover.
- DPM waterproof Gaiters.

Personal Equipment

- Bose crewman's helmet APC crew.
- Rabintex RBH 303IE combat helmet with DPM/UN blue covers.
- IPLCS Battlevest, Large backpack/patrol pack, DPM web gear.
- Combat body armour (Personal body armour with DPM/UN blue covers). New body armor under acquisition in 2025. 6,105 new Individual Modular Body Armour System, or IMBAS, body armor ordered 2025 with delivery by June 2026 and option for 2,000 more.
- Hatch Protective knee/elbow pads.
- Camelbak hydration systems normal 2.5 L version and 3 L CBRN version.
- ESS profile NVG protective goggles.

== Service dress ==
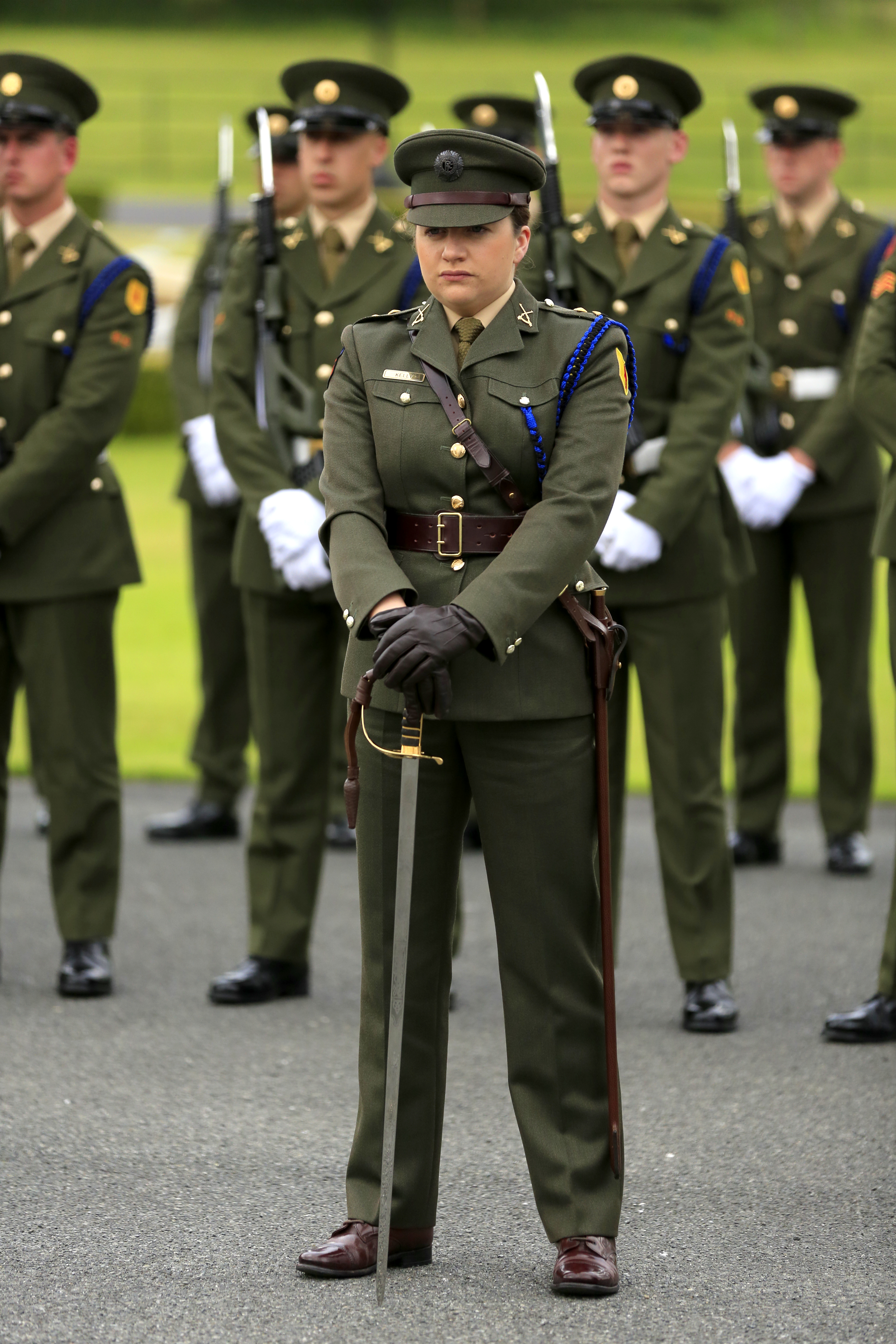
Ceremonial party in service dress

The Service Dress (SD) Uniform is used by the Army for ceremonial and administrative duties. It resembles service dress worn in many armies, but is in a distinctive green shade. The uniform, introduced in 1961, consists of a jacket which is open to show a creamy brown shirt and green tie. The layout of the uniform varies from corps to corps. For enlisted soldiers, the rank markings are worn on the sleeves of the issue tunic. The Unit and Brigade Flashes are worn on the right and left sleeves respectively. A lanyard depicting the corps function is worn over the left shoulder and pinned to the left chest pocket button (e.g. white lanyard for artillery, red for military police). The corps badge is pinned to the tunic lapels. A cloth belt with brass buckles is worn around the waist of the tunic.

Black leather gloves are worn by privates or NCOs below BQMS rank. When worn as SD No. 1, the cloth belt is traded for a white dress belt, and white gloves are worn by enlisted personnel below BQMS rank. Medals are worn with SD No. 1. Medal ribbons are worn with SD No. 2 and 3.

Peaked caps have been introduced and are worn by enlisted ranks on ceremonial occasions.

With SD No1 troops wear the all-leather "Linkers" ceremonial boot. The tunic button is a stay-bright material with a harp and the inscription "IV" commemorating the Irish Volunteers.

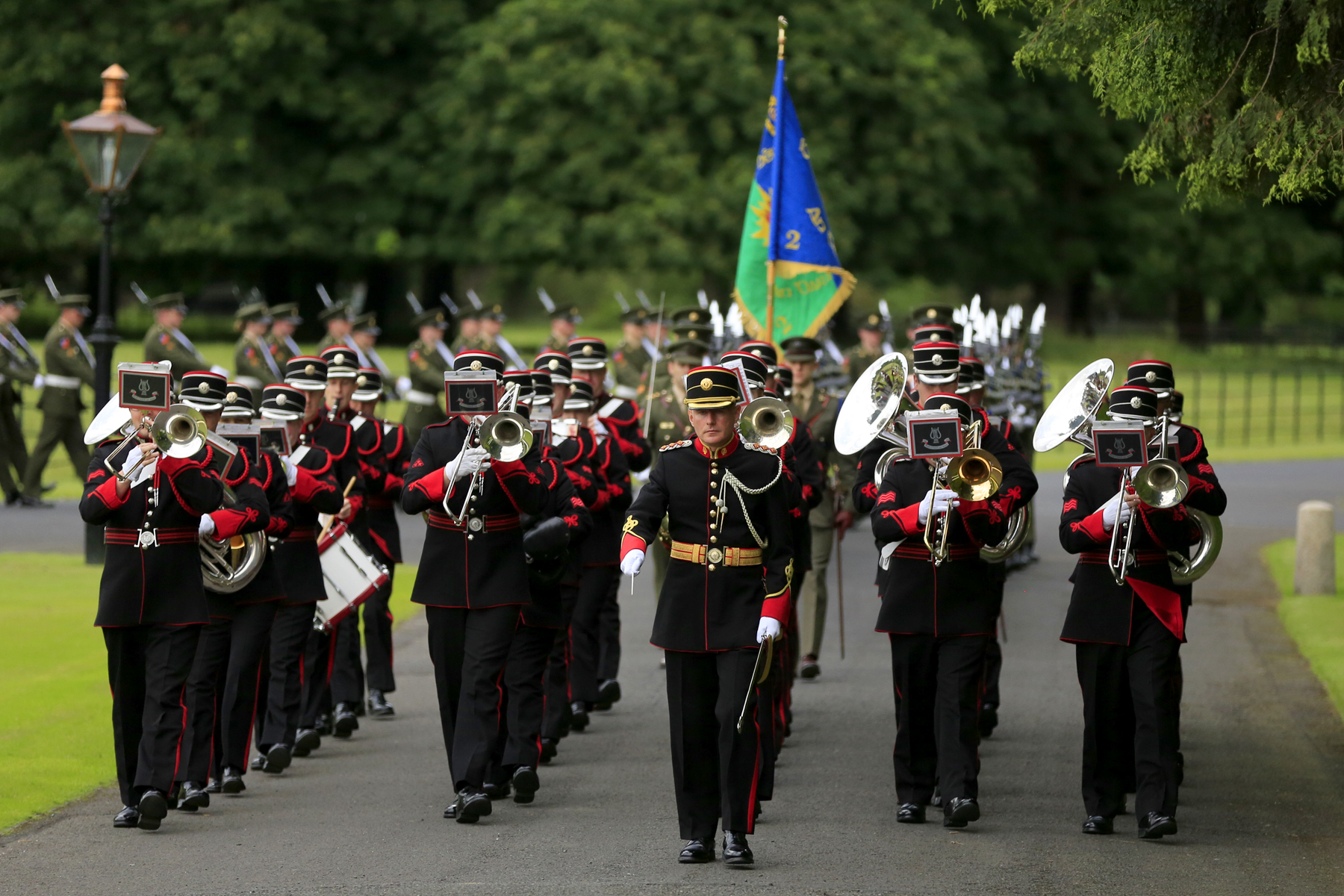
Army No 1 Band in uniform

Officers have their rank markings pinned to the shoulder straps of their tailored tunic. They also wear a Sam Browne Belt in brown leather. The Officers SD No. 1 Uniform also includes brown leather shoes and brown leather gloves. Non-cavalry officers in the Permanent Defence Force wear peaked caps, whereas cavalry and reserve officers wear Glengarry hats with black and green ribbons respectively. All officers except colonels and higher ranks (who have since 2010 worn a gilt badge backed with red cloth) wear bronze cap badges, marking them out from the enlisted ranks who have anodised aluminium brass coloured cap badges.

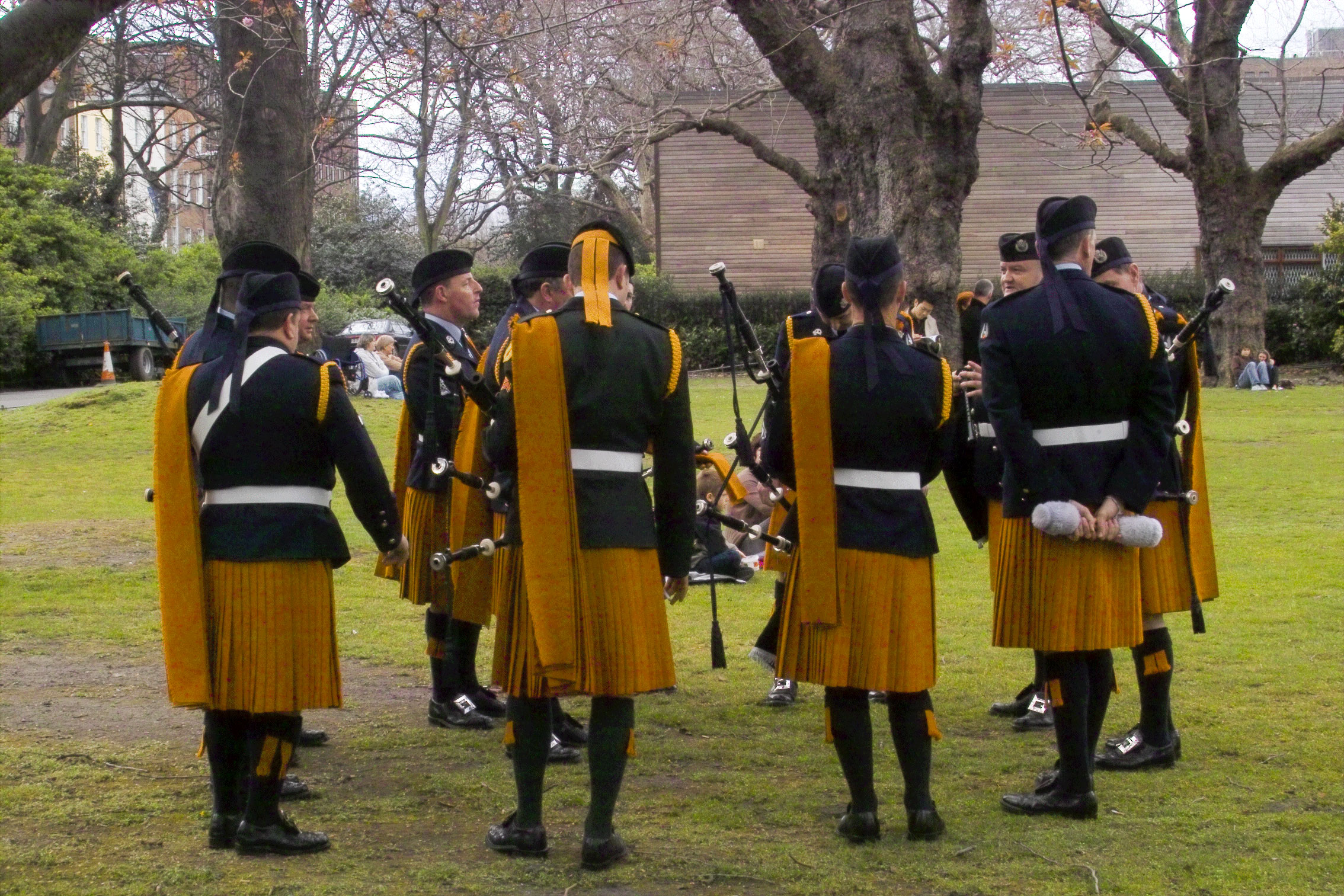
Irish Army pipe band in uniform

Army Bands wear a black ceremonial uniform with red facings and red stripes on the trousers and a forage cap as headwear.

The Cavalry corps ceremonial escort of honour wears a new dress uniform since 2010.

Army Pipers and drummers wear a saffron kilt with Royal green tunics and black beret with saffron band and ribbons.

Brass type name tags are worn with Service dress No. 1, 2 and 3.

== See also ==
- Irish Defence Forces cap badge
