= Artillery Corps (Ireland) =

Irish Army Artillery Corps
- Irish: An Cór Airtléire
- Active: 1 October 1924 – present
- Country: Ireland
- Branch: Army
- Type: Artillery
- Role: Field Artillery and Air Defence
- Part of: Defence Forces
- Website: www.military.ie/en/who-we-are/army/army-corps/artillery-corps/

Insignia
- Flag
- Abbreviation: ARTY

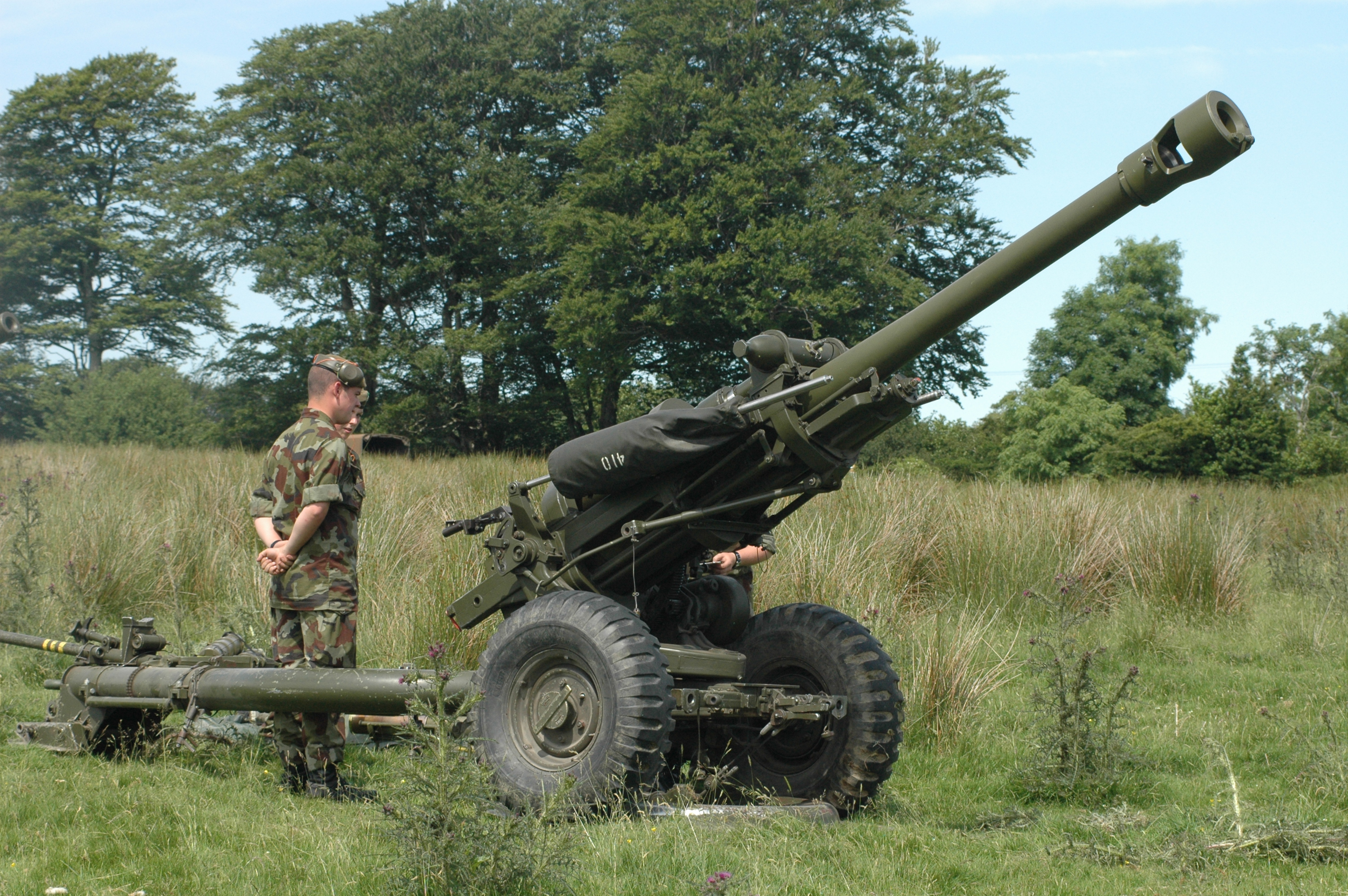
A 105mm light gun shoot (Army Reserve)

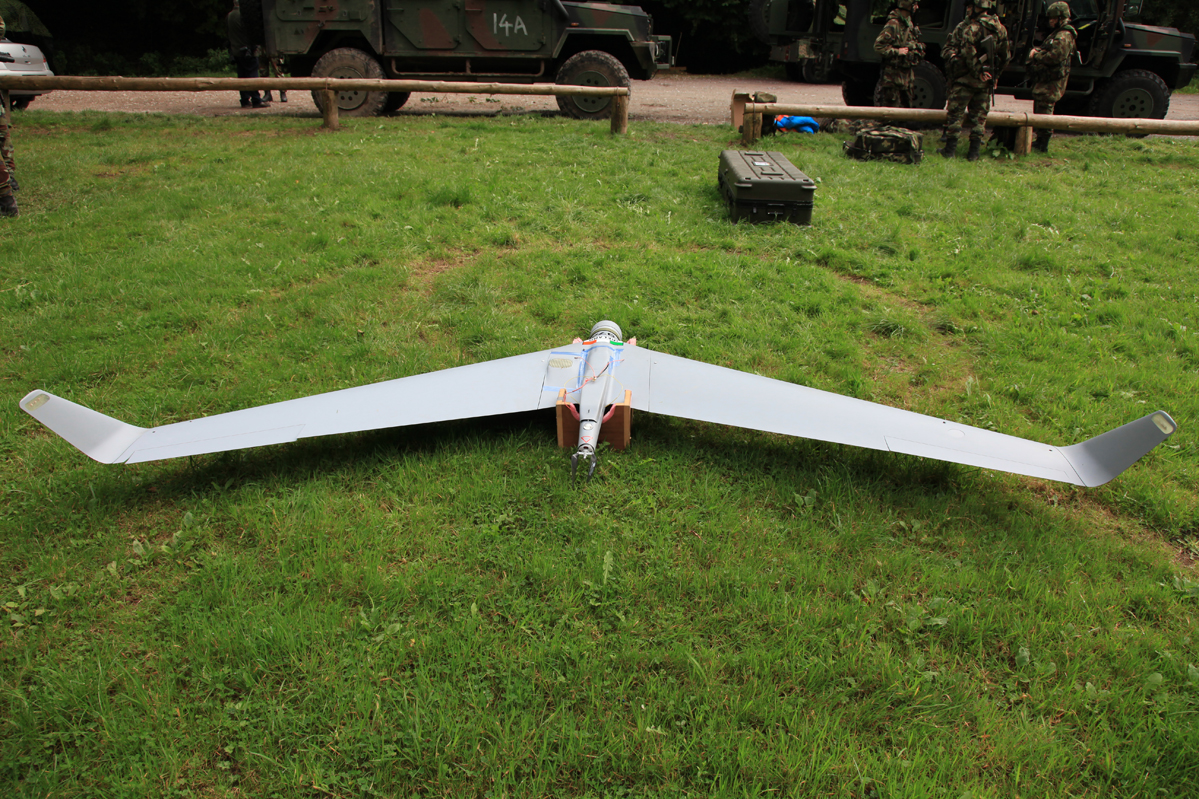
Aeronautics Defense Systems Orbiter Mini UAV System drone operated by the Artillery Corps

The Artillery Corps (ARTY) (Irish: An Cór Airtléire) are the artillery corps of the Irish Army. The Corps provides fire support to other sections of the Army. The Corps was first founded in 1924.

== Organisation ==
From the Emergency (1939–1945), the Artillery Corps was organised into separate Coastal Defence, Field Artillery and Air Defence Regiments. In the late 20th century, the Coastal Defence component was dissolved and integrated with the Field Artillery component. In 2013 the Air Defence regiment also ceased to operate as a separate component, and the Field Artillery regiments, known as Brigade Artillery Regiments, took over the Air Defence role.

Today the Artillery Corps comprises the Artillery School, located in the Defence Forces Training Centre (DFTC) in the Curragh Camp, and two Brigade Artillery Regiments (one for each of the two Brigades of the army). They are located in Collins Barracks, Cork (1 BAR) and Custume Barracks, Athlone (2 BAR).

== Weapons ==
=== Field artillery ===
- L118 & L119 105mm howitzers (main artillery support weapon)
- Brandt 81mm mortars
- Ruag M87 120 mm heavy mortars
- Ordnance QF 25-pounder, 6 retained for use as a ceremonial gun

=== Air defence ===
- RBS-70 Surface to Air Missile system
- Browning .50 caliber HMG (on "cobra" mount)

=== Coastal artillery ===
- QF 12-pounder 12 cwt gun; 10 former coastal artillery guns are used, in two fixed saluting batteries, for ceremonial gun salutes only. Four are in Cork Harbour at Fort Mitchel, Spike Island, County Cork. A further six are in Dún Laoghaire Harbour, County Dublin.

=== Historic weapons ===
==== Field artillery ====
The field artillery guns that have formerly been in Irish Defence Forces service throughout history (starting from Anglo-Irish Treaty 1921, Artillery Corps established 1923, Defence Forces established 1924) are as follows:

- 18 Pounder Field Gun (in various marks, Mark I, Mark II, Mark IV)
- 60 Pounder Field Gun
- 3.7in Howitzer
- 4.5in Howitzer
- 75mm Field Gun
- 25 Pounder Field Gun, 48 ex-British Mark IIIs acquired in 1949, retired from the Army 1981 and from the Reserve in 2009, now only used in ceremonial gun salutes
- Brandt AM 50 120mm mortar

Other artillery systems (defined as 20mm or more in caliber and requiring a crew (2 or more people) to operate and not being mounted on an armored vehicle) in Irish Defence Forces service throughout history:

- Madsen 20 mm cannon
- 2-pdr anti-tank gun
- 60mm mortar
- 81mm mortar
- 6-pounder anti-tank gun
- 17-pounder anti-tank gun
- Brandt Mle 27/31
- ML 3-inch
- Brandt Mle 1935

Lancia armoured troop carriers and lorries were used to tow and transport the artillery guns during the Irish Civil War, with horses being introduced after the civil war.

==== Anti-aircraft weapons ====
Anti-aircraft weapons in Ireland have been under the command of the Artillery Corps. Historic anti-air weapons include:

- Hotchkiss M1909 Machine Guns .303
- QF 12-pounder 12 cwt naval gun (modified for anti-aircraft purposes)
- QF 3.7-inch AA gun
- 3-inch 20 cwt gun
- Bofors 40 mm L/60 gun
- Bofors 40 mm L/70
- Saab GIRAFFE Mk IV radars in support of the RBS 70. All 7 radars were donated to Ukraine.
- Flycatcher mobile air defence radars paired to Bofors L70 air defence guns.

==== Coastal defence guns ====
Coastal artillery has been retired in Ireland, but it was connected to Artillery Corps when it existed. Former coastal artillery guns include:

- BL 9.2-inch
- BL 6-inch Mk II–VI naval gun (Fort Mitchel, Spike Island), BL 6-inch Mk VII naval gun (Fort Dunree, Lough Swilly, County Donegal)
- QF 12-pounder 12 cwt
- QF 4.7-inch
