= Company quartermaster sergeant =

Military rank or appointment, in charge of supplies

Company quartermaster sergeant is a military rank or appointment.

== Canada ==
A company quartermaster sergeant (CQMS) in the Canadian Forces is the non-commissioned officer in a company who is in charge of supplies. The CQMS also serves as the deputy to the company sergeant major and is the second most senior NCO in the company. This appointment is held by a warrant officer. Historically, before the Unification of the three services, the rank of staff sergeant was generally reserved for CQMS appointees in the former Canadian Army.

Squadron quartermaster sergeant is the equivalent in the Royal Canadian Armoured Corps, Canadian Military Engineers, and in Royal Canadian Corps of Signals. Battery quartermaster sergeant is the equivalent in the Royal Canadian Artillery.

== Ireland ==
CQMS Insignia (Irish Army)

The rank of company quartermaster sergeant (CQMS) (ceathrúsháirsint complacht in Irish) is also used in the Irish Army. It is an actual rank and is subordinate to the company sergeant (equivalent to a company sergeant major). The CQMS is in charge of supplies, transport, stores, weapons, ammunition and accommodation. He or she answers to the company sergeant in matters regarding the physical welfare of the troops, including the issue of kit and the supply of food and water and other stores.

The title of company quartermaster sergeant is used in the infantry and most corps units. However, in the artillery, the rank is known as battery quartermaster sergeant (BtyQMS), not to be confused with the higher rank of battalion quartermaster sergeant (BQMS), which is equivalent to a warrant officer, and in the cavalry it is known as squadron quartermaster sergeant (SQMS). The Air Corps uses the rank of flight quartermaster sergeant.

== Myanmar ==
The rank of company quartermaster sergeant (CQMS) is also used in the Myanmar Army. The CQMS is in charge of supplies, transport, stores, weapons, ammunition and accommodation. The CQMS is also the deputy to the company sergeant major and is the second most senior NCO in the company. Its equivalent rank in the Myanmar Air Force is squadron quartermaster sergeant and in the Myanmar Navy is chief petty officer.

== United Kingdom ==
In the British Army, the appointment of company quartermaster sergeant is filled by a staff/colour sergeant

The company quartermaster sergeant (CQMS) in the British Army and Royal Marines is the non-commissioned officer in a company who is in charge of supplies. The CQMS also serves as the deputy to the company sergeant major and is the second most senior NCO in the company.

By 1913, there were two colour sergeants in each army infantry company. On 1 October 1913, they received the two new appointments of company sergeant major and company quartermaster sergeant, with one of each in each company. CQMS remains an appointment of colour sergeant. In infantry companies, the CQMS continues to be addressed as "colour sergeant" (or "sir" by subordinates in a foot guards regiment) and not as "quartermaster sergeant", "CQMS", or just "Q", which is common in other corps. Quartermaster sergeants are never addressed by the more junior rank of "sergeant". They wear the rank badge of a crown over three chevrons.

Squadron quartermaster sergeant (SQMS) is the equivalent in the Royal Armoured Corps, Special Air Service, Royal Engineers, Royal Corps of Signals, Army Air Corps, Royal Army Medical Service, Royal Logistic Corps, Honourable Artillery Company, and formerly in the Royal Corps of Transport. Battery quartermaster sergeant (BQMS) is the equivalent in the Royal Artillery. Squadron quartermaster corporal (SQMC) is the equivalent in the Household Cavalry (in which it is an appointment of staff corporal).

== United States ==
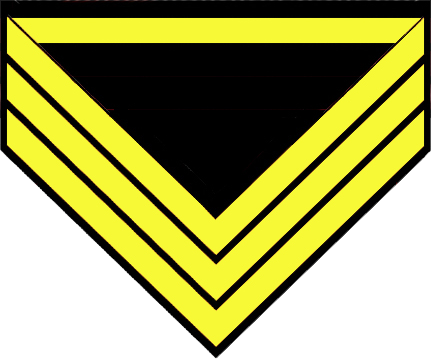
US Cavalry company quartermaster chevrons

During the American Civil War, beginning on 4 May 1861, each company of Union cavalry was authorised a company quartermaster sergeant. The company quartermaster sergeant was responsible for the company wagon and all the property it contained, including the tents, the company mess gear, the company desk, the company library, the ordnance, the subsistence provisions, and the company tools. He was further charged with overseeing the camp set-up of the tents and picket lines. He inspected the company horses and mules, and reported any problems to the veterinary surgeon of the regiment. He was also responsible for acquiring fuel, forage for the horses, and straw for bedding for the company. These were normally drawn from the supplies of the regimental quartermaster, along with replacements for uniforms and equipment. When they were not available from stores, the company quartermaster sergeant was responsible for forage parties to acquire them. The company quartermaster sergeant was required to sign for the uniforms and equipment that were in his custody and before disbursing these items to a soldier, he required a signature of receipt, countersigned by an officer.

The rank of company quartermaster sergeant was not a command position, although he was required to know the drills, and the duties and responsibilities of the line NCOs. He was the second most senior NCO in the company after the first sergeant. During combat, his place was safeguarding the company wagon and its supplies. He was generally required to fight only in defence of the company property. In an extreme emergency, he could be used to replace a fallen line NCO, but this was extremely rare. The wagons were driven by teamsters, who were usually members of the company. Additionally, each cavalry company was authorized a wagoneer with the rank of corporal.

The company quartermaster sergeant wore three chevrons with a single straight tie in worsted. Although worn by volunteer cavalry from 1862, this rank badge was not incorporated into United States military regulations until 1866. The rank, and insignia, were also used by the Confederate Army during the Civil War.

A battery quartermaster sergeant was also authorised for every artillery battery from 4 May 1861. They began to adopt the same unofficial chevrons as the cavalry from May 1863.

The rank was last used by the U.S. Army during World War I. It was discontinued after the war.
