= Company sergeant =

Non-commissioned officer rank in the Irish Army

Company Sergeant Service Dress insignia

Company Sergeant subdued insignia

Company Sergeant (CS) (Sáirsint Complachta in Irish) is a non-commissioned officer rank in the Irish Army equivalent to a First Sergeant in the United States Army and Warrant Officer Class 2 in the British Army.

The insignia of a Company Sergeant for service dress is three 1/4-inch-wide (6.4 mm) winged chevrons in red, with a 1/8-inch (3.2 mm) yellow border; 1/2 inch (13 mm) above is an army badge embroidered in red. The entire insignia is 3 1/2 inches (89 mm) wide. The subdued rank insignia has smaller chevrons, and the badge is in larger proportion to avoid confusion with other ranks.

Irish ranks derive from the British system at the foundation of the Irish Free State in 1922. In the Irish Army the rank was always known as Company Sergeant, but originated in the British appointment of Company Sergeant Major. The CS is the senior NCO of a company, responsible for day-to-day administration and training along with the company second-in-command, who is a Captain.

In the Artillery Corps, the rank is known as Battery Sergeant (Bty Sgt or BS) and in the Cavalry Corps it is known as Squadron Sergeant (SS).
