= Irish Defence Forces cap badge =

Irish military insignia

Badge of the Defence Forces.

The Irish Defence Forces cap badge (or "FF badge" as it is sometimes called) is common to all services and corps of the Defence Forces of Ireland. Although principally associated with the Irish Army (the regulations of the Defence Forces describe it as "the Army Badge"), it is also worn by (and appears in elements of the insignia of) the Naval Service and the Air Corps.

== Origin and early usage ==
An original Volunteers brass badge dating from circa 1914. The inscription reads Drong Áṫa Cliaṫ (Drong Átha Cliath in modern orthography), Irish for 'Dublin Brigade', a variant name for the Dublin Volunteer Brigade.

The badge was designed in 1913 by Eoin MacNeill, a founding member and chairman of the Irish Volunteers, but there is also evidence that points to other origins, notably Canon Peadar Ua Laoghaire and The O'Rahilly. Variations existed for territorial commands, but the majority of volunteers wore the Óglaigh na hÉireann badge. The "FF" in the centre is an abbreviation of "Fianna Fáil" or "Soldiers of Destiny" was suggested by Canon Peadar Ua Laoghaire as the name of the Volunteers in 1915. The Fianna were band of Gaelic warriors in prehistoric Ireland. The Fál or "Stone of Destiny" was the coronation stone used for the High King of Ireland. It was worn by republicans in the 1916 Easter Rising. It was rarely worn by the Irish Republican Army in the War of Independence, as doing so could lead to a prison term. Eventually, the Free State Army adopted the badge for its new uniforms before the Irish Civil War.

== Description ==
=== Design ===
The design of the Army Badge is prescribed in Defence Force Regulations as follows:

"...As a component of rank insignia and which is specified in the Third Schedule as the form of the cap badge, shall be comprised of a sunburst - An Gal Gréine, surmounted by an 8-pointed star, a point of the star being uppermost, bearing the letters "FF" (in Gaelic characters) encircled by a representation of an ancient warrior's sword belt on which the words "Óglaigh na hÉireann" are inscribed."

=== Inscription ===
- "FF" - Fianna Fáil - "Fianna of Inis Fáil", i.e. Army of Ireland (the political party Fianna Fáil formed in 1926 adopted the same name)
- "Óglaiġ na h-Éireann" - Irish Volunteers

== Current usage and variations ==
=== Irish Army ===
In the Army, the badge is worn by all ranks on all head-dress. Enlisted and non-commissioned ranks wear a "Stay-Brite" anodised aluminium brass replica. Some enlisted ranks, particularly older soldiers, wear the original Brass Badge which, although no longer official issue, is considered a symbol of lengthy service. Commissioned Officers and Senior NCOs, such as Sergeant Major and Battalion/Regimental Quartermaster, wear a larger dark bronze version. This tradition is assumed to have begun on the death of Michael Collins during the Irish Civil War, when officers dulled their badges with boot polish in commemoration of the general. The bronze badge was introduced in 1924.

"Stay-Brite" version of the badge, usually worn by enlisted personnel in the Defence Forces.

These two variations are worn by all ranks. However, on the Service Dress Uniform, the ranks of Colonel, Brigadier General, Major General and Lieutenant General – and the Head Chaplain – have a gold bullion version on a red cloth backing. The same version is worn on the Mess Dress Uniform peaked cap by all officers.

=== Irish Naval Service ===
In the Naval Service, the "Stay-Brite" version of the badge is worn by Seamen and Leading Seaman on their caps and on the operational berets.

=== Irish Air Corps ===
The Air Corps previously wore army uniforms. Upon the introduction of a distinct blue Air Corps uniform in 1994, cloth cap badges were introduced for the forage caps and peaked caps. These have a smaller and less-detailed version of the badge embroidered into the design, which incorporates a phoenix.

== See also ==
- Cap badge
- Irish Army rank insignia
