= Irish Army =

Land service branch of the Irish Defence Forces

- An tArm (Irish)
- Badge of the Defence Forces
- Active: 1922–present
- Country: Ireland
- Type: Army
- Role: Counterinsurgency; Disaster response Domestic security Land warfare Peacekeeping
- Size: 6,322 active personnel (Establishment: 7,520) (April 2023); 1,382 Reserve (Establishment: 3,869) (April 2023)
- Part of: Defence Forces (Irish: Óglaigh na hÉireann)
- Engagements: see list of wars
- Website: Defence Forces – Army

Commanders
- GOC 1 Brigade: Brigadier General Caimin Keogh
- GOC 2 Brigade: Brigadier General Stephen Ryan
- GOC DFTC: Brigadier General Louis Flynn

Insignia
- Flag

The Irish Army (Irish: an tArm) is the land component of the Defence Forces of Ireland. As well as maintaining its primary roles of defending the State and internal security within the State, since 1958 the Army has had a continuous presence in peacekeeping missions around the world. The Irish Army is organised into two brigades. The Air Corps and Naval Service support the Army in carrying out its roles.

The Army has an active establishment of 7,520, and a reserve establishment of 3,869. Like other components of the Defence Forces, the Irish Army has struggled to maintain strength and as of April 2023 had only 6,322 active personnel, and 1,382 reserve personnel. However, the Irish government introduced several measures in an attempt to improve recruitment and retention, and in 2024 inductions to the Defence Forces exceeded discharges.

== Roles of the Army ==
The roles of the Army are;

- To defend the Irish state against armed aggression.
- To give aid to the civil power (ATCP). This means that the Army assists, when requested, the Garda Síochána, which has primary responsibility for law and order in Ireland.
- To participate in multinational peace support, crisis management and humanitarian relief operations in support of the United Nations peacekeeping missions, and EUFOR (UN-sanctioned peacekeeping missions only).
- To carry out other duties which may be assigned to them from time to time. For example, assistance on the occasion of natural disasters, assistance in connection with the maintenance of essential services, etc.

== History ==
=== Beginning of the Army ===
The Army has its origins in the Irish Volunteers, a nationalist militia formed in 1913. The Volunteers launched the Easter Rising in April 1916. By 1919, the Volunteers became known as the Irish Republican Army (IRA) and fought the British government forces during the Irish War of Independence. The Provisional Government was set up on 16 January 1922 to assume power during the handover to the new Irish Free State and withdrawal of British forces, and established the new National Army.

On 31 January 1922, a former IRA unit (the Dublin Guard) assumed its new role as the first unit of the new National Army and took over Beggars Bush Barracks, the first British barracks to be handed to the new Irish Free State. The National Army's first Commander-in-Chief, Michael Collins, envisaged the new Army being built around the pre-existing IRA, but over half of this organisation rejected the compromises required by the Anglo-Irish Treaty which established the Irish Free State, and favoured upholding the revolutionary Irish Republic which had been established in 1919.

As such, from January 1922 until late June and the outbreak of the Irish Civil War, there existed two antagonistic armed forces: the National Army, built from a nucleus of pro-Treaty IRA units, and armed and paid by the Provisional Government; and the anti-Treaty IRA, which refused to accept the legitimacy of the new state. Both forces continued to use the Irish-language title Óglaigh na hÉireann, which had previously been used by both the original IRA and its predecessor, the Irish Volunteers of the mid-1910s. In July 1922, Dáil Éireann authorised raising a force of 35,000 men; by May 1923 this had grown to 58,000. The National Army lacked the expertise necessary to train a force of that size, such that approximately one-fifth of its officers and half of its soldiers were Irish ex-servicemen of the British Army, who brought considerable experience to it.

=== Civil War period ===
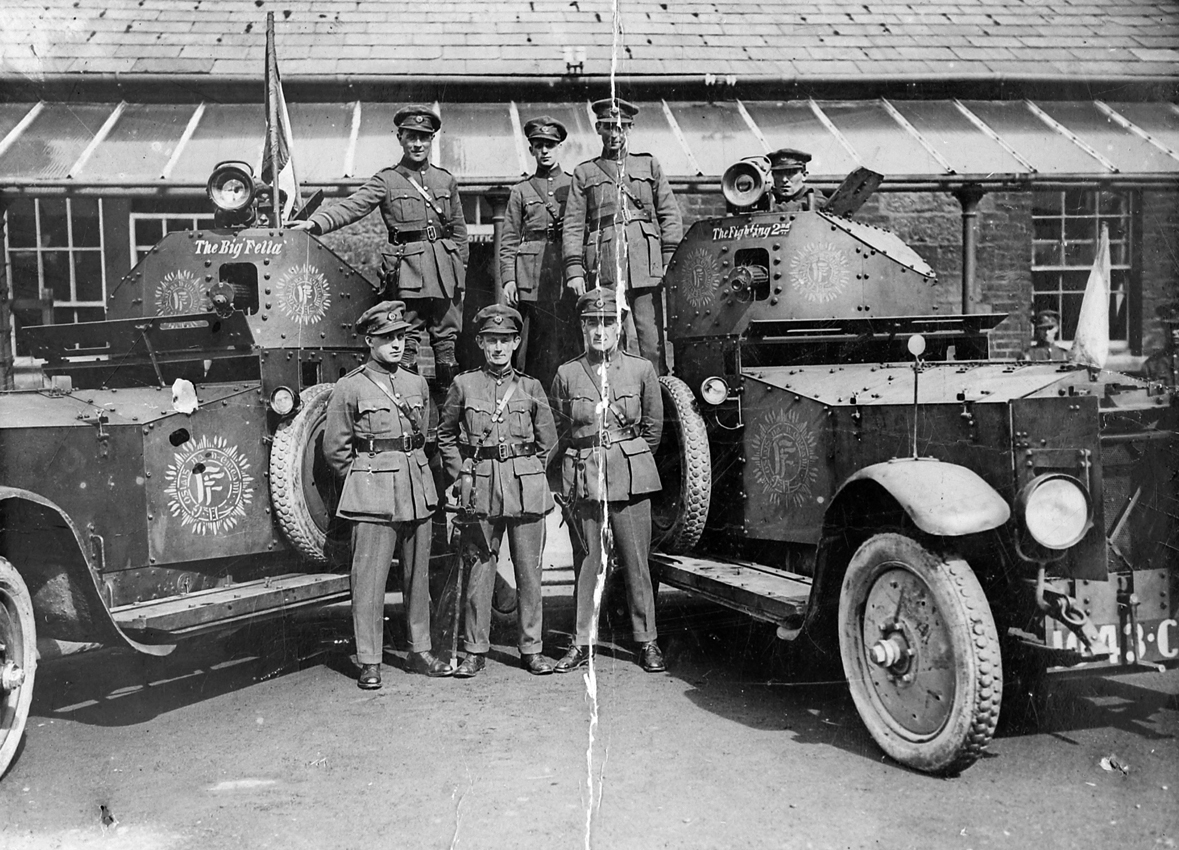
Rolls-Royce armoured cars during the Civil War

The pro-Treaty Sinn Féin party had won an election on 16 June 1922. Anti-Treaty IRA units, who had occupied the Four Courts in Dublin, had kidnapped JJ O'Connell, a lieutenant-general in the National Army. The Provisional Government was facing increasing British threats of direct intervention. They acted to assert control over the situation and The Irish Civil War broke out on 28 June 1922 with the shelling of the Four Courts by Free State forces.

In the early weeks of the Civil War, the newly formed National Army was mainly composed of pro-Treaty IRA units, especially the Dublin Guard, whose members had personal ties to Michael Collins. Its size was estimated at 7,000 men, in contrast to about 15,000 anti-Treaty IRA men. However, the Free State soon recruited far more troops, with the army's size mushrooming to 55,000 men and 3,500 officers by the end of the Civil War in May 1923. Many of its recruits were war-hardened Irishmen who had served in the British Army during the First World War. W. R. E. Murphy, a second-in-command of the National Army in the civil war (from January until May 1923), had been a lieutenant colonel in the British Army, as had Emmet Dalton. Indeed, the Free State recruited experienced soldiers from wherever it could; two more of its senior generals, John T. Prout and JJ "Ginger" O'Connell, had served in the United States Army.

The British government had supplied the National Army with small arms and ammunition as they departed from Ireland as well as a few armoured cars. They later supplied artillery, which enabled it to bring the Civil War to a relatively speedy conclusion. The Four Courts and O'Connell Street were taken from anti-Treaty IRA units during the Battle of Dublin in July 1922. The anti-Treaty IRA were also dislodged from Limerick and Waterford in that month, and Cork and County Kerry were secured in a decisive seaborne offensive in August.

The remainder of the war was a guerrilla war, concentrated particularly in the south and west of the country. On 15 October, directives were sent to the press by Piaras Béaslaí, the Free State director of communications, to the effect that Free State troops were to be referred to as the "National Army", the "Irish Army", or just "troops". The Anti-Treaty troops were to be called "Irregulars" and were not to be referred to as "Republicans", "IRA", "forces", or "troops", nor were the ranks of their officers allowed to be given. National Army units, especially the Dublin Guard, were implicated in a series of atrocities against captured anti-Treaty fighters.

The National Army suffered about 800 fatalities in the Civil War, including its commander-in-chief, Michael Collins. Collins was succeeded by Richard Mulcahy.

In April 1923, the anti-Treaty IRA called a ceasefire, and in May it ordered its fighters to "dump arms", effectively ending the war.

=== National Army ===
With the end of the Civil War, the National Army had grown too big for a peacetime role and was too expensive for the new Irish state to maintain. In addition, many of the civil war recruits were badly trained and undisciplined, making them unsuitable material for a full-time professional army. The Special Infantry Corps was established to perform the army's first post-war duty, breaking the strikes of agricultural labourers in Munster and south Leinster, as well as reversing factory seizures by socialists.

Richard Mulcahy, the new Irish defence minister, proposed to reduce the army from 55,000 to 18,000 men in the immediate post-Civil War period. This provoked an Army Mutiny in 1923–24, particularly among former IRA officers who considered that former British Army officers were being treated better than they were.

On 3 August 1923, the new State passed the Defence Forces (Temporary Provisions) Act, putting the existing armed forces on a legal footing. This Act raised "an armed force to be called Óglaigh na hÉireann (hereinafter referred to as the Forces) consisting of such number of officers, non-commissioned officers, and men as may from time to time be provided by the Oireachtas." The date of the establishment of the Defence Forces was 1 October 1924. The term "National Army" fell into disuse.

The Army had a new establishment, organisation, rank markings, headdress and orders of dress. The National Army's Air Service became the Air Corps and remained part of the Army until the 1990s. An all-Irish language-speaking unit was created – An Chéad Chathlán Coisithe (English: The First Infantry Battalion) was established in Galway, and functioned exclusively through the medium of the Irish state's first official language.

=== The Emergency ===
Volunteer Force recruitment poster, 1930s. The Irish reads: ‘Tar asteach ins na h-Óglaigh’, which means: ‘Come into the Volunteer [army]’

Ireland remained neutral during the Second World War, which was referred to as "The Emergency" by the Irish government. About 5,000 soldiers deserted and joined the British military. Those who returned in 1945 were summarily dismissed from the armed forces and disqualified from any form of state-funded employment for seven years. These soldiers received an official amnesty and apology from the government of Ireland on 7 May 2013.

Despite the Irish stance of neutrality, the Army was greatly expanded during the war (with more recruited to reserve forces). At its peak, the army was made up of almost 41,000 personnel, with another 106,000 reservists. Upon the outbreak of war two independent brigades were raised. During the so-called Phoney War period, numbers of men mobilised decreased. The Fall of France, however, saw a significant change in the government's attitude, and by early 1941 seven brigades were mobilised. On 9 May 1941, Minister for Defence Oscar Traynor approved the establishment of the 1st Division and 2nd Division, both of which encompassed six brigades, leaving the 5th Brigade to remain independent, as part of Curragh Command. This expansion was undertaken in the face of potential invasions from either the Allied or Axis powers (both of whom had drawn up contingency plans to invade Ireland).

In the Christmas Raid of 1939, the remnants of the IRA stole a large quantity of the Irish Army's reserve ammunition from its dump at the Magazine Fort in Dublin's Phoenix Park. While this was seen as an embarrassment for the Irish Army, most of it was recovered.

For the duration of the war, Ireland, while formally neutral, tacitly supported the Allies in several ways. For example, the Donegal Corridor allowed British military aircraft based in County Fermanagh to fly through Irish airspace to the Atlantic, thereby greatly increasing their operational range. G2, the Army's intelligence section, played a role in the detection and arrest of German spies, such as Hermann Görtz.

== Peacekeeping missions ==
Since Ireland joined the United Nations in 1955, the Army has been deployed on many peacekeeping missions. The first of these took place in 1958 when a small number of observers were sent to Lebanon. A total of 86 Irish soldiers have died in the service of the United Nations since 1960 (see List of Irish military casualties overseas).

Irish ONUC troops (36 Bn) man a position over the Elizabeth road tunnel during the Congo Crisis, December 1961 (Image: Defence Forces)

=== Congo ===
The first major overseas deployment came in 1960, when Irish troops were sent to the Congo as part of the UN force ONUC. The Belgian Congo became an independent republic on 30 June 1960. Twelve days later, the Congolese government requested military assistance from the United Nations to maintain its territorial integrity. On 28 July 1960 Lt-Col Murt Buckley led the 32nd Irish Battalion to the newly independent central African country. This was the most costly enterprise for the Army since the Civil War, as 26 Irish soldiers died.

Nine died in a single incident called the "Niemba Ambush", in which an eleven-man Irish patrol was ambushed by local tribesmen. Nine Irish soldiers and some 25 tribesmen were killed. A Niemba Ambush commemoration is hosted annually by the Irish Veterans Organisation (ONET) in Cathal Brugha Barracks, on the nearest Saturday to the actual date of the ambush.

One of the largest ONUC engagements in which Irish troops were involved was the Siege of Jadotville. During this action, a small party of 155 Irish soldiers ("A" Company, 35th Battalion) was attacked by a larger force of almost 4,000 Katangese troops, as well as French, Belgian and Rhodesian mercenaries, and supported by a trainer jet (a Fouga CM.170 Magister), equipped for ground attack. The Irish soldiers repeatedly repelled the attackers, and knocked out enemy artillery and mortar positions using 60mm mortars. An attempt was made by 500 Irish and Swedish Army soldiers to break through to the besieged company, but the attempt failed. A Company's commanding officer Commandant Patrick Quinlan, eventually surrendered his forces. A small number of Irish soldiers were wounded, but none killed. It is estimated, however, that up to 300 of A Company's attackers were killed, including 30 white mercenaries, and that up to 1,000 were wounded.

A total of 6,000 Irishmen served in the Congo from 1960 until 1964.

=== Cyprus and the Sinai ===
Starting in 1964, Irish troops have served as UN peacekeepers in Cyprus (UNFICYP). Over 9,000 Irish personnel have served there to date, without suffering casualties.

In 1973, an infantry group and some logistical troops were pulled out of Cyprus at short notice to serve in the Sinai desert between Egypt and Israel as part of the UN force that supervised the ceasefire that ended the Yom Kippur War.

From 1976 to 1981, UNFICYP was commanded by an Irish officer, Major-General James Quinn.

=== Lebanon ===
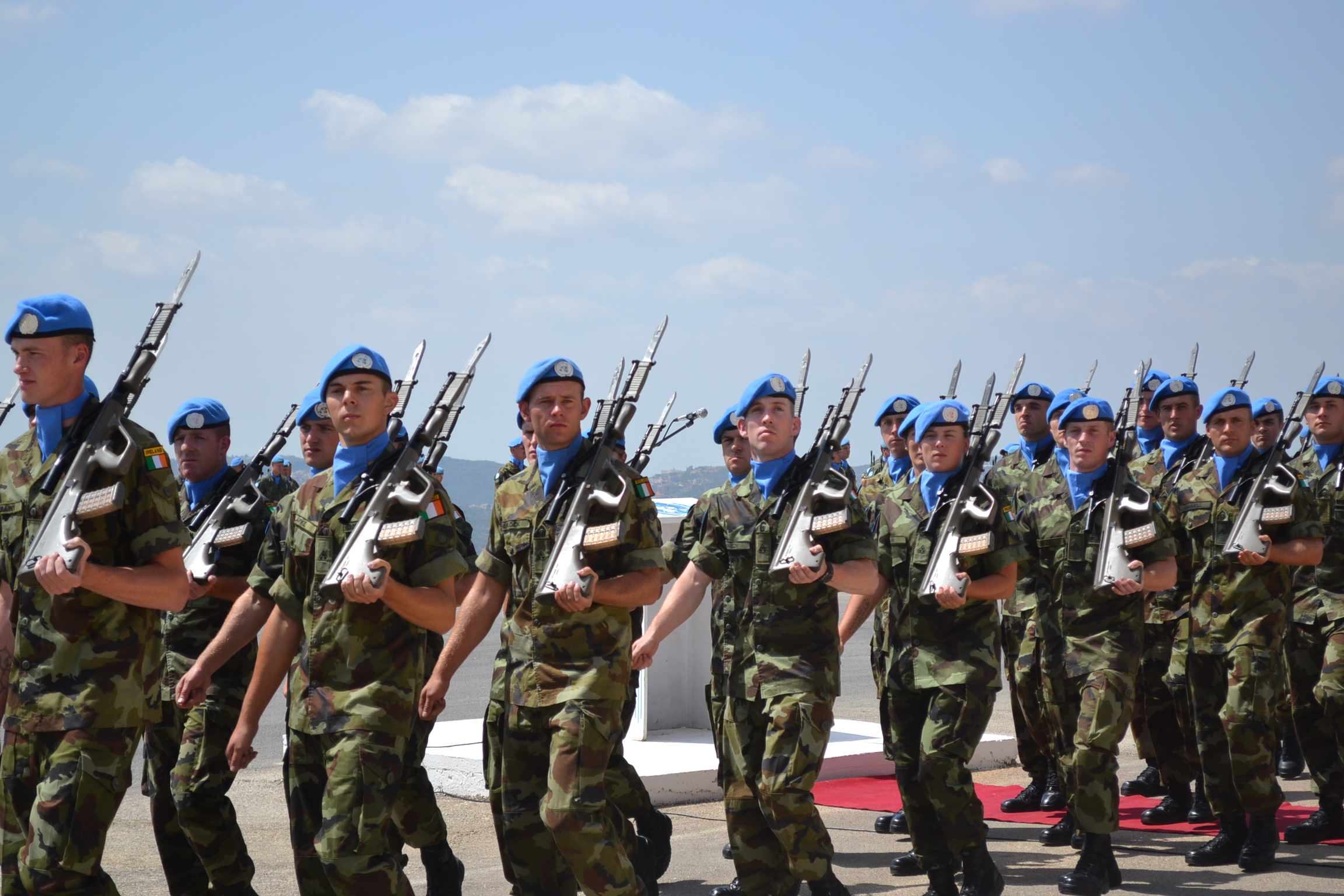
Irish troops serving with UNIFIL in 2013

From 1978 to 2001, a battalion of Irish troops was deployed in southern Lebanon, as part of the UN mandate force UNIFIL. The Irish battalion consisted of 580 personnel which were rotated every six months, plus almost 100 others in UNIFIL headquarters and the Force Mobile Reserve. In all, 30,000 Irish soldiers served in Lebanon over 23 years.

The Irish troops in Lebanon were initially intended to supervise the withdrawal of the Israel Defense Forces from the area after an invasion in 1978 and to prevent fighting between the Palestine Liberation Organization forces and Israel.

In April 1980, three Irish soldiers were killed in an episode of violence near At Tiri in Southern Lebanon. On 16 April 1980, soldiers attempting to set up a checkpoint near At Tiri were attacked by members of the South Lebanon Army (an Israeli-backed Christian militia). Private Stephen Griffin, of the 46th Irish Battalion, was shot in the head and died. Two days later, a party of three Irish soldiers, an American officer, a French officer and two journalists were travelling to a UN post near the Israeli border when they were intercepted by members of the S.L.A. Private John O'Mahony from Killarney, County Kerry was shot and wounded and his two comrades Privates Thomas Barrett from Cork and Derek Smallhorne from Dublin were driven away. Both men were found shot dead nearby, with their bodies showing signs of torture.

Another Israeli invasion in 1982 forced the PLO out of southern Lebanon and occupied the area. The following eighteen years until 2000 saw prolonged guerrilla warfare between Israeli forces, their allies in the South Lebanon Army and Hezbollah. UNIFIL was caught in the middle of this conflict. The Irish battalion's role consisted of manning checkpoints and observations posts and mounting patrols. A total of 47 soldiers were killed. In addition to peacekeeping, the Irish provided humanitarian aid to the local population – for example, aiding the orphanage at Tibnin. From 25 April 1995 to 9 May 1996, Brigadier General P. Redmond served as Deputy Force Commander of UNIFIL during a period that coincided with the Israeli Operation Grapes of Wrath offensive in 1996.

Most Irish troops were withdrawn from Lebanon in 2001, following the Israeli evacuation of their forces the previous year. However, 11 Irish troops remained there as observers. They were present during the 2006 Lebanon War. After this conflict, UNIFIL was reinforced and a mechanised infantry company of 165 Irish troops was deployed to southern Lebanon. Their role was to provide perimeter protection for a Finnish Army engineering unit. After 12 months, the 1st Finnish/Irish Battalion ceased operations and was stood down from duty after having completed its mandate with UNIFIL. A number of Irish personnel remained in service at UNIFIL HQ in Southern Lebanon.

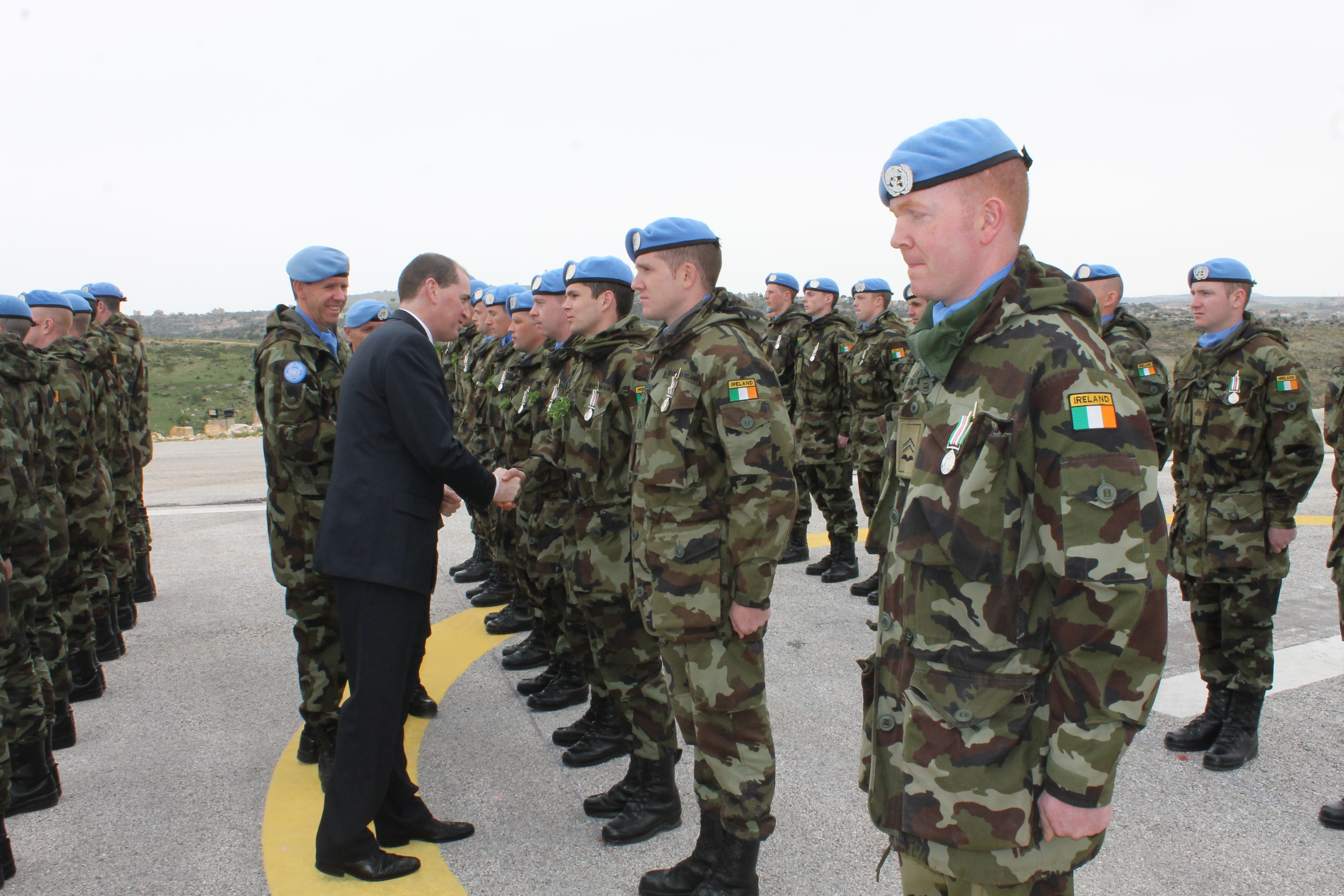
Irish troops in Lebanon in 2014

Irish battalions returned to Lebanon in 2011 – initially with roughly 480 troops deployed in the region. This was reduced to approximately 330 troops in May 2013, and further to 180 troops in November 2013. As of May 2016, there were 194 Irish soldiers deployed to UNIFIL serving alongside Finnish Armed Forces as part of a joint Battalion which is currently under Finnish command. Ireland takes over command of the Battalion from Finland in November 2016 at which time an additional Company of some 150 personnel will be deployed to UNIFIL bringing Ireland's contribution to this mission to 340 personnel.

In November 2022, 333 Irish soldiers deployed to southern Lebanon as part of UNIFIL's 121st Infantry Battalion. On 14 December 2022, one Irish peacekeeper was killed and seven others were injured in a "serious incident" involving small arms fire in the Hezbollah controlled village of Al-Aqbieh.

=== Iran and Iraq ===
From August 1988 until May 1991, Irish soldiers were deployed under the UN force UNIIMOG, on the border between Iraq and Iran to supervise the withdrawal of both sides' forces to within their respective borders after the end of the Iran–Iraq War. The Irish provided 177 of the 400 UNIIMOG personnel involved with the mission. The mission came to an end in 1991, when Iran and Iraq completed the withdrawal of their troops. A small number of Irish observers were stationed in Kuwait from 1991 to 2002 as part of UNIKOM.

=== Somalia and Eritrea ===
In 1993, 100 troops forming a transport company were deployed in Somalia, as part of the UNOSOM II peace-enforcing mission. In December 2001, 221 Irish soldiers were sent to Eritrea as part of UNMEE, and were tasked with the defence of the UN headquarters there.

=== Bosnia and Kosovo ===
In 1997 an Irish Army Military Police unit and a company of transport corps troops were deployed to Bosnia as part of SFOR (1995–2005) and EUFOR (December 2005 to present). The MP company was based in SFOR HQ in Sarajevo and policed the 8,000 SFOR troops based in the area. From 1999 until 2010, a company of Irish troops was stationed in Kosovo as part of KFOR.

=== East Timor ===
In July 1999, Irish officers were sent to East Timor as part of the UNAMET observer group (Timorese Independence Referendum). In October, a platoon of Rangers (1 Ircon) from the Army Ranger Wing (ARW) were sent as part of the INTERFET peacekeeping force after the Referendum. The ARW platoon served in the reconnaissance company of the 1st Battalion, Royal New Zealand Regiment (1 RNZIR) Battalion Group for a four-month tour. INTERFET handed over to UNTAET during ARW 2 Ircon's tour in 2000. The third contingent to East Timor (3 Ircon) in June 2000 marked a new departure for the Defence Forces, as all the infantry sections were drawn from the 2nd Infantry Battalion. Late 2000 saw the 12th Infantry supply 4 Ircon. Nine contingents in total were deployed including 4 Infantry Battalion, 5 Infantry Battalion, 28 Infantry Battalion, 1 Cathlán Coisithe, and finally the 6 Infantry Battalion under UNMISET until May 2004.

=== Liberia ===
After November 2003, Irish troops were stationed in Liberia as part of UNMIL. The Liberian mission was the largest Irish overseas deployment since Lebanon and consisted of a single composite battalion. The UN force, UNMIL, was 15,000 strong and was charged with stabilising the country after the Second Liberian Civil War. The Irish troops were based in Camp Clara, near Monrovia and were tasked with acting as the Force Commander's "Quick Reaction Force" (QRF) in the Monrovia area. This meant the securing of key locations, conducting searches for illegally held weapons, patrolling and manning checkpoints on the main roads and providing security to civilians under threat of violence. The Irish deployment to Liberia was due to end in November 2006. However, at that time the deployment was extended for a further 6 months to May 2007. During the UNMIL deployment, a detachment of Irish Army Rangers successfully rescued a group of civilians being held hostage by renegade Liberian gunmen. Acting on intelligence, twenty heavily armed Rangers were dropped by helicopter, freeing the hostages and capturing the rebel leader. In all the following battalions were involved in 2,745 cumulative missions under UNMIL:

- 90th Infantry Battalion (4th Western Brigade) – Nov 2003–May 2004
- 91st Infantry Battalion (2nd Eastern Brigade) – May 2004–Nov 2004
- 92nd Infantry Battalion (1st Southern Brigade) – Nov 2004–May 2005
- 93rd Infantry Battalion (4th Western Brigade) – May 2005–Nov 2005
- 94th Infantry Battalion (2nd Eastern Brigade) – Nov 2005–May 2006
- 95th Infantry Battalion (1st Southern Brigade) – May 2006–Nov 2006
- 96th Infantry Battalion (4th Western Brigade) – Nov 2006–May 2007

=== Chad ===
In August 2007, the Irish government announced that 200 Irish soldiers would be sent to support the United Nations effort as part of EUFOR Chad/CAR. As of 2008 500 troops had been deployed – 54 of whom were Irish Army Rangers. In announcing the mission, the Minister for Defence recognised the regional nature of the crisis, involving instability in Darfur, Chad and the Central African Republic. In accordance with their terms of reference, the deployment of Irish forces was confined to Chad. Ireland contributed the second largest contingent of soldiers to EUFOR Chad/CAR, after France, as part of the mission to establish peace in Chad and to protect refugees from neighbouring Darfur. The Irish soldiers conducted operations concerned with the delivery of humanitarian aid, protection of civilians, and ensuring the safety of UN personnel. There were a number of deployments to the mission, rotating every four months, with the final contingent completing their tour in May 2010:

- 97th Infantry Battalion – June 2008–Oct 2008
- 98th Infantry Battalion – Oct 2008–Jan 2009
- 99th Infantry Battalion – Jan 2009–May 2009
- 100th Infantry Battalion – May 2009–Oct 2009
- 101st Infantry Battalion – Oct 2009–Jan 2010
- 102nd Infantry Battalion – Jan 2010–May 2010

=== Syria ===
In 2013 the United Nations asked Ireland to send peacekeepers as part of the United Nations Disengagement Observer Force (UNDOF) in the Golan region of Syria, to try to contain the Syrian civil war from spreading into Israel. The 43 Infantry Group, consisting of 115 personnel, deployed into Syria in September 2013. The group is tasked primarily to serve as the Force Mobile Reserve within the UNDOF Area of Responsibility. The Irish peacekeepers were attacked by Syrian rebels on 29 November 2013. The Irish convoy came under small arms fire and a Mowag APC later struck a land mine, damaging the vehicle, when driving out of the attack. The Irish returned fire with 12.7mm (.50 calibre) heavy machine guns mounted on their vehicles before the rebels retreated.

The Irish were involved in a combat mission in August 2014 after 44 Fijian UN troops were captured by the rebel Al Nusra organisation. Nearby, 35 Filipino UN troops managed to conduct a successful breakout attempt and an armoured escort from the Irish 44th Infantry Group escorted the Filipino soldiers to safety. Fire was exchanged with heavy machine guns but there were no casualties on the UN side. The Irish Minister for Foreign Affairs stated he would withdraw the Irish contingent from Golan unless guarantees could be given about their safety. '"We don't want to see Irish troops or the UN contingent being drawn into a Syrian civil war"', he said. Irish troops were withdrawn into Israeli occupied Golan in 2014. Nevertheless, as of late 2016, 138 Irish troops remained deployed in the region under UNDOF. In late 2018 the UN contingent returned to the Syria side of the de facto border after Syrian government forces took Daraa and Quneitra from rebel forces in the 2018 Southern Syria offensive.

=== Irish peacekeeping missions ===
Below is table of peacekeeping missions in which Ireland has participated.

The Irish Defence Forces contributions to UN peacekeeping operations as at 1 March 2025
Mission	From	To
UNTSO	DEC 58	
UNIFIL	MAY 78	
MINURSO	SEP 91	JUL 21
MONUC/MONUSCO	JUN 01	Apr 21
UNDOF	JUN 13	
MINUSMA	SEP 19	SEP 22
ONUCI	JUN 04	MAR 17
RSM	JAN 15	MAR 16
ISAF	2002	DEC 14
UNMAS	AUG 13	SEP 14
UNSMIS	MAY 12	AUG 12
UNFICYP	MAR 64	MAY 05
UNNY	NOV 78	OCT 07
UNIKOM	APR 92	MAR 03
UNMOP	FEB 96	DEC 99
UNSMA	JUL 96	OCT 99
UNSCOM	SEP 97	MAR 03
UNPREDEP	FEB 96	FEB 99
ONUC	JUL 60	JUN 64
UNTEA	AUG 62	OCT 62
UNIPOM	SEP 65	MAR 66
UNEF II	OCT 73	SEP 74
UNDOF	JUN 97	AUG 98
UNIT	JUN 84	JUL 88
UNMOGIP	SEP 87	JUN 92
UNRWA	FEB 88	JUN 92
UNMOGAP	APR 88	MAR 90
OSGAP	MAR 90	DEC 94
OSGA	DEC 94	JUL 96
UNIIMOG	AUG 88	MAR 91
UNTAG	MAR 89	APR 90
ONUCA	DEC 89	JAN 92
ONUSAL	JAN 92	MAY 94
UNAVEM II	JUL 91	SEP 93
UNTAC	MAR 92	NOV 93
UNMLO-Y	JAN 92	APR 92
UNPROFOR	MAR 92	FEB 96
UNTAES	FEB 96	JAN 98
UNHCR (Y)	DEC 92	MAR 93
UNOSOM II	AUG 93	JAN 95
UNMIH	SEP 94	MAR 96
UNAMET	JUN 99	OCT 99
UNMIK	JUL 99	APR 09
UNMISET	MAY 02	MAY 04
UNMEE	NOV 01	JUN 03
UNTAET	FEB 00	MAY 02
MINUCI	JUN 03	JUN 04
UNMIL	NOV 03	JAN 08
UNJLC	JAN 05	MAY 05
ACEH	SEP 05	DEC 06
MINURCAT	MAR 09	DEC 10

== Current overseas deployments ==
As of 1 December 2015, 493 Defence Force personnel are serving in 12 different missions throughout the world including Lebanon (UNIFIL), Syria (UNDOF), Middle East (UNTSO), Kosovo (KFOR), German-led Battle Group 2016 and other observer and staff appointments to UN, EU, OSCE and PfP (NATO Partnership for Peace) posts.

As of March 2025, there were 428 Defence Forces personnel to overseas missions and locations deployed in 17 missions. The missions were:

Organization	Area	Name	Deployed
UN	Middle East	UNTSO	13
UN	Lebanon	UNIFIL	350
UN	Syria	UNDOF	3
EU	Bosnia and Herzegovina	EUFOR	5
NATO	Kosovo	KFOR	13
EU	Italy	EUNAVFOR MED IRINI	4
OSCE	Austria	Irish Representative at OSCE Headquarters	1
EU	Belgium	Irish EU Military Staff	8
EU	Germany	EU Battlegroup	14
UN	USA	Irish UN Delegation Military Adviser	1
OSCE	Austria	Irish OSCE Delegation Military Adviser	1
EU	Belgium	Military Representative to EU	4
NATO	Belgium	Liaison Officer of Ireland to NATO	4
EU	Belgium	EU Operation Althea	1
NATO	Belgium	Irish Liaison Officer to SHAPE & Military Co-Op Division	1
UN	Uganda	UNMAS	1
EU		EUMAM UA	4

== Training ==
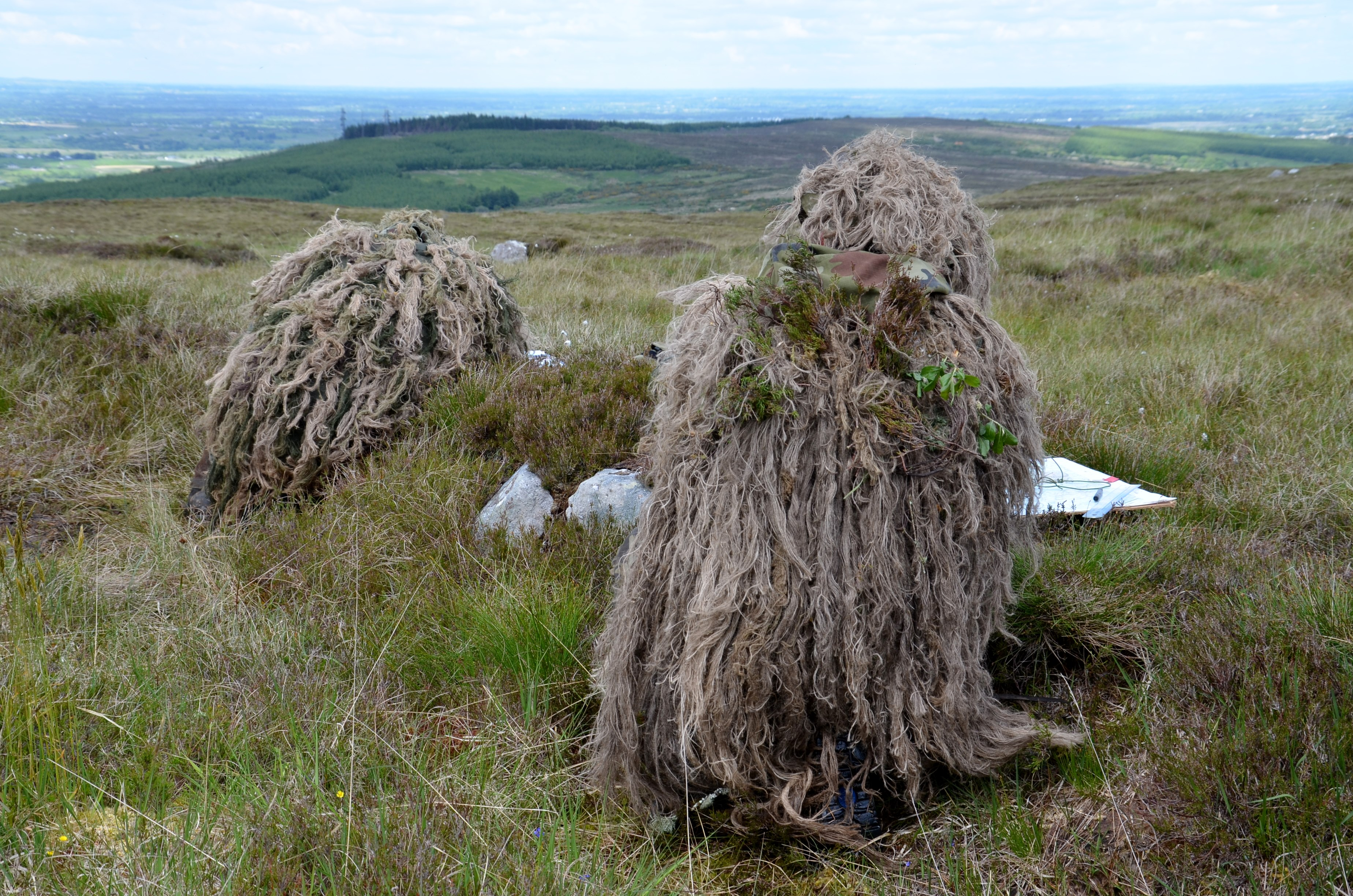
Two soldiers wearing ghillie suits for concealment while in sniper training

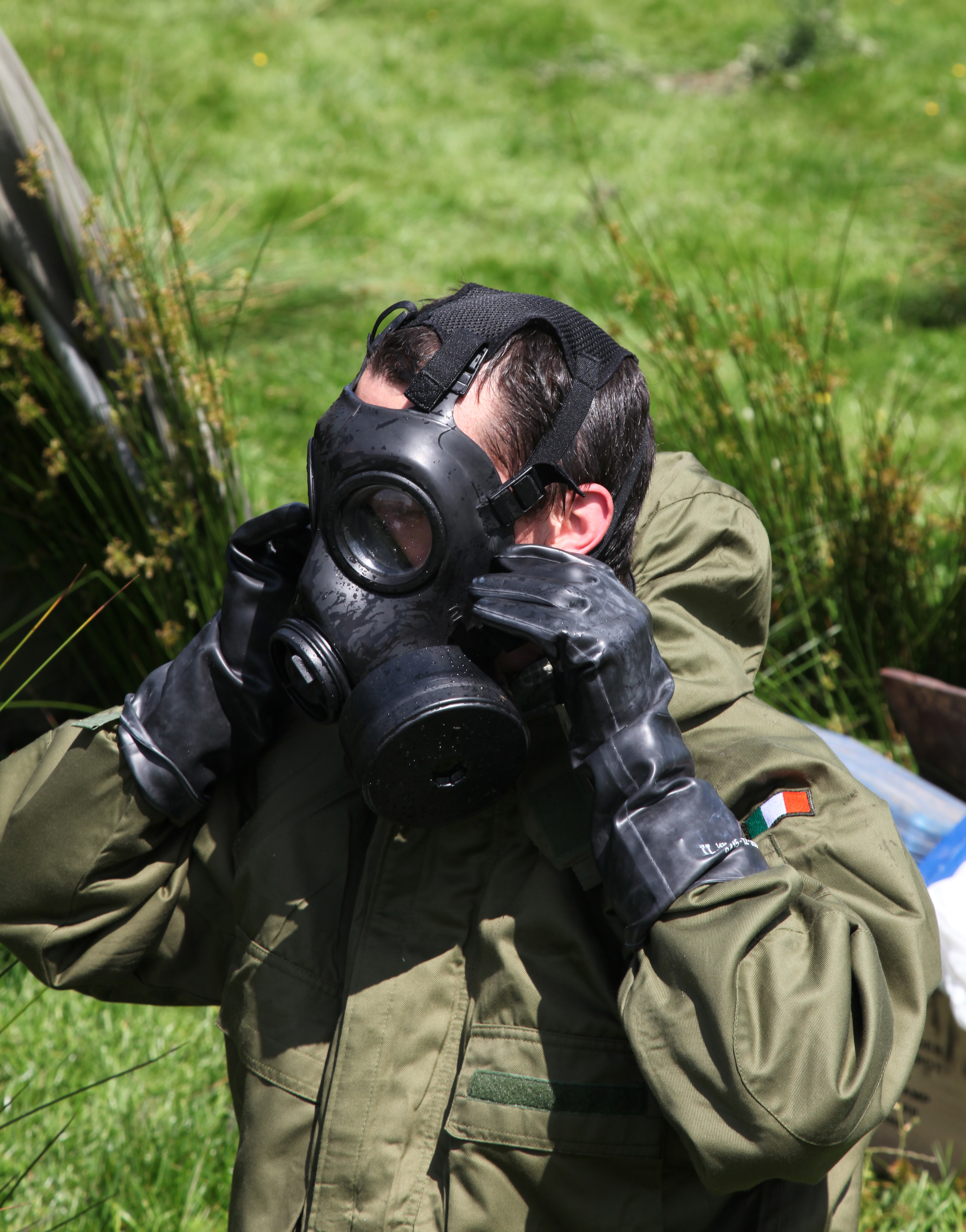
Chemical, biological, radiological and nuclear (CBRN) training

All enlisted members of the Army undergo 29 weeks of training in order to become a fully trained infantry soldier. The first 17 weeks is recruit training, after which they become a 2 Star Private. They then undergo a further 12 weeks of advanced training, after which they pass-out as a 3 Star Private, Trooper or Gunner depending on their respective Corps. During this continuous 29 weeks of training, they are required to live in barracks. The Army recruits both men and women.

Recruit training includes foot drill, arms drill, field-craft, medical, radio operation, rifle marksmanship, unarmed combat, counter-IED, tactical and daily physical training (PT). During this stage of training, they are also given weapons training on the Steyr Rifle, General Purpose Machine Gun and grenade.

On completion of recruit training, soldiers become 2 Star Privates and immediately begin 3 Star training. This includes more advanced training of everything covered by recruit training plus riot training, navigation, CBRN, helicopter drills, survival, FIBUA, ATCP training, live fire tactical training, etc. They also receive further weapons training on the M203 Grenade Launcher and Short Range Anti-Armour Weapon.

Throughout their service, soldiers must complete Trained Soldier Specialist Training courses to advance their skills and for promotion.

== Organisation ==
As of 2023, the Army had an establishment of 7,520 active and 3,869 reserve personnel organised into two brigades. Prior to 2012, the army was divided into three brigades, organised to be responsible for a geographical area of the State: Southern, Eastern and Western. Following budgetary decisions in 2011, the army was reorganised in late 2012 into a two-brigades structure. The training element of the army, the Defence Forces Training Centre, operates independently of the brigade structure.

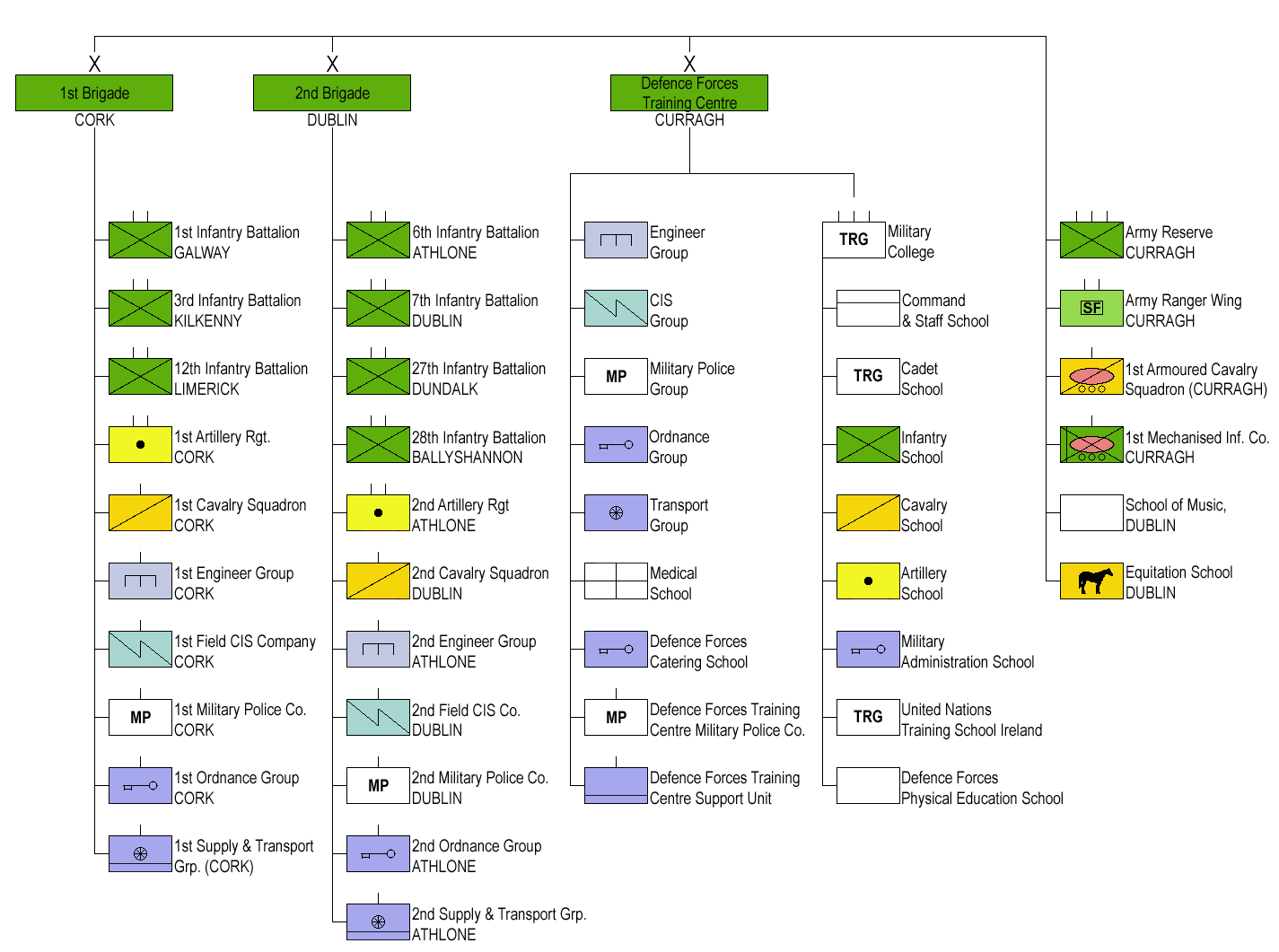
Structure of the Irish Army

- Irish Army
  - 1st Brigade, at Collins Barracks in Cork
  - 2nd Brigade, at Cathal Brugha Barracks in Dublin
  - Defence Forces Training Centre, at Curragh Camp in Curragh
  - Army Ranger Wing, at Curragh Camp in Curragh
  - Army Reserve

== Army Corps ==
=== Infantry Corps ===
The Infantry Corps represent the largest component and are the operational troops of the Army. They must be prepared for tactical deployment in any location at short notice. In wartime this means that they will be among the frontline troops in the defence of the Irish state. In peacetime, they can be seen daily performing operational duties in aid to the civil power such as providing escorts to cash, prisoner or explosive shipments, patrols of vital state installations and border patrols, including checkpoints.

=== Artillery Corps ===
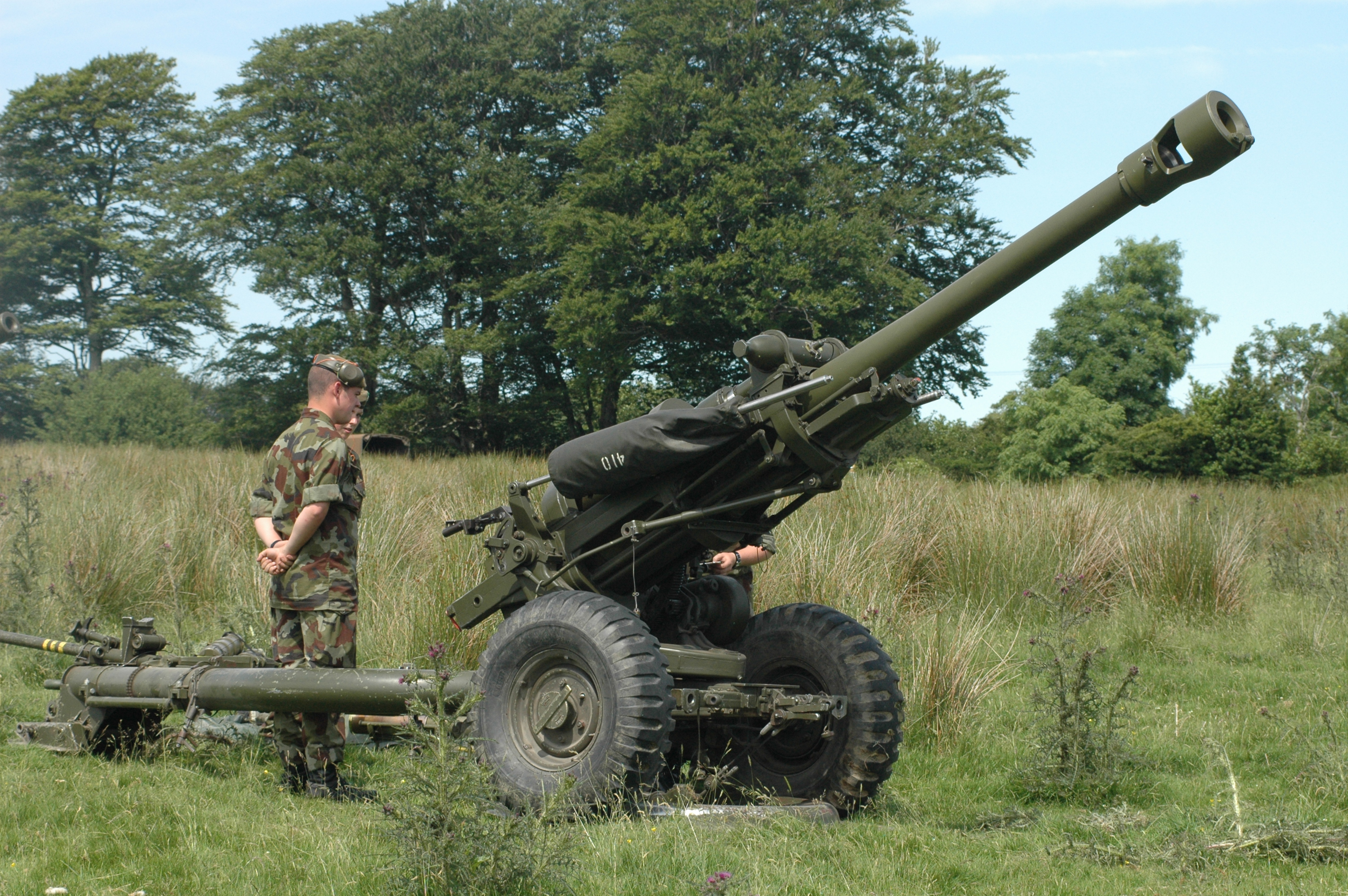
105mm L118 light gun crewed by the Artillery Corps (Army Reserve)

The Artillery Corps provides fire support as required by infantry or armoured elements. The Corps was founded in 1924 and today consists of two main branches: Field Artillery and Air Defence. Between them, the two branches of the Corps provide several vital services;

- Fire support of Infantry or Armoured troops.
- Ground to low-level air defence.
- Light field battery support to Irish overseas battalion.
- Aid to the civil power duties.

Each brigade has a single artillery regiment.

=== Cavalry Corps ===
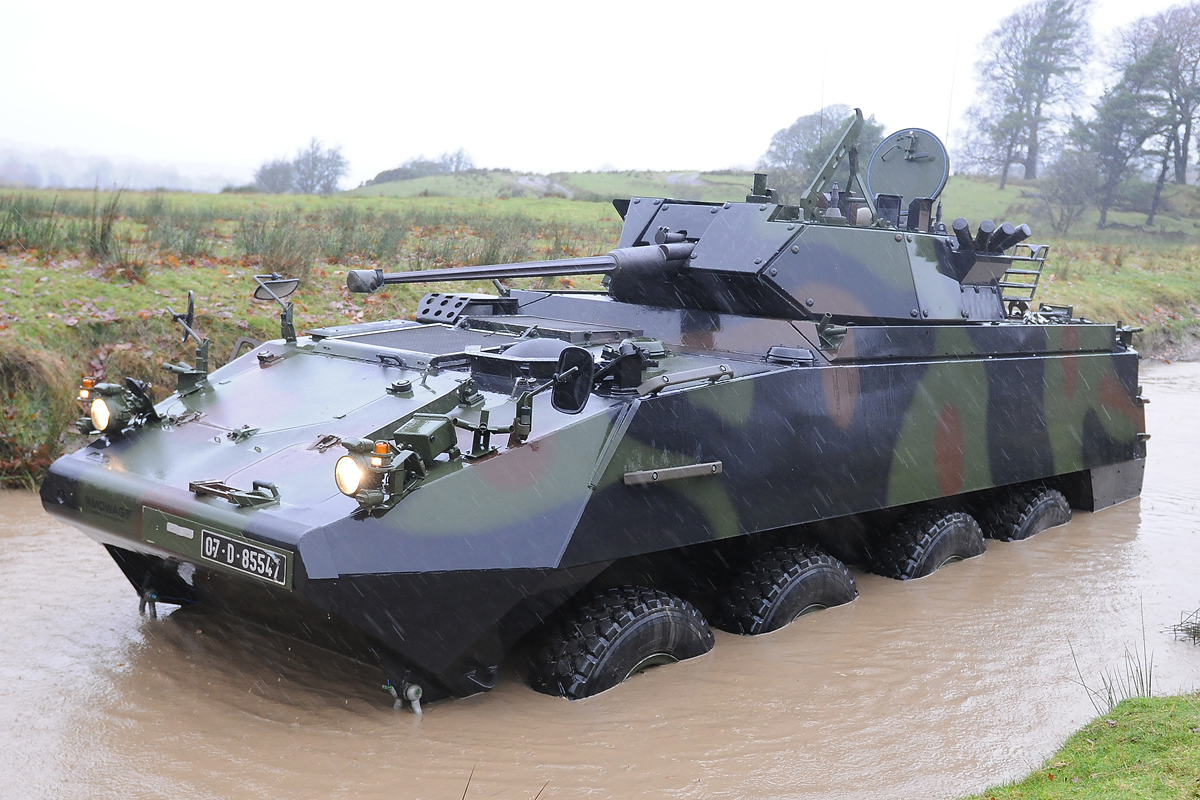
Cavalry Corps MOWAG Piranha

The Cavalry Corps is the army's armoured reconnaissance formation.

=== Engineer Corps ===
The Engineer Corps is the combat engineering unit of the Defence Forces. The Engineer Corps is responsible for all military engineering matters across the Defence Forces.

=== Ordnance Corps ===
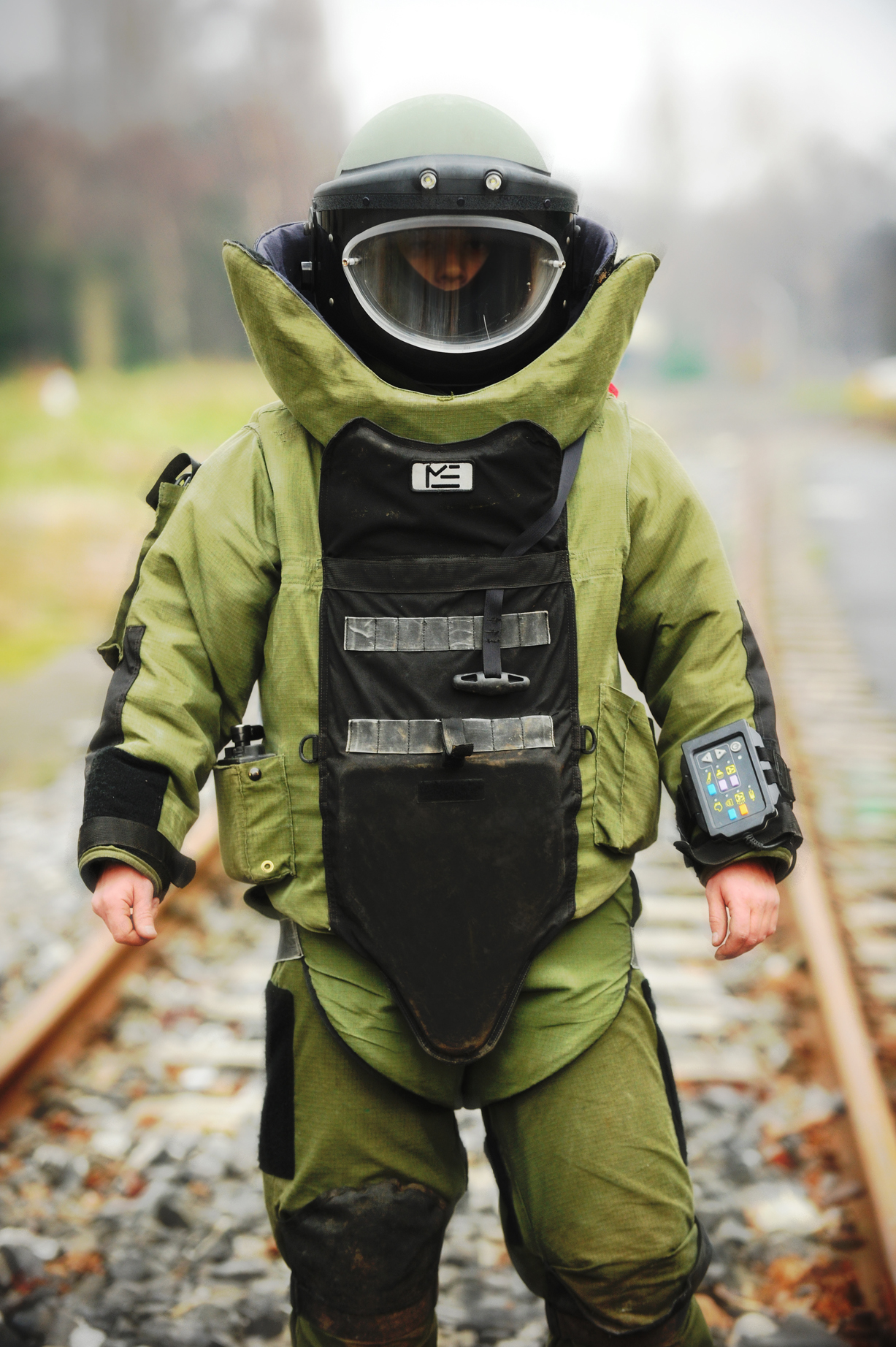
A member of an Irish Army Explosive Ordnance Disposal (EOD) team

The responsibility for the procurement and maintenance of all ordnance equipment is vested in the Ordnance Corps and encompasses a spectrum of equipment ranging from anti-aircraft missiles and naval armament to the uniforms worn by military personnel. The corps is also responsible for the procurement of food and provision of commercial catering services. These tasks are of a technical nature and the corps personnel are appropriately qualified and with the expertise to afford technical evaluation of complete weapon systems, it also includes embracing weapons, ammunition, fire control instruments and night vision equipment. The Ordnance Corps provides improvised explosive device disposal within the state, in support of the Garda Síochána. Courses are conducted for its own personnel and for students from the military and police of other nations. Ordnance Corps personnel continue to serve in overseas missions and are an essential component of missions involving troops.

=== Transport Corps ===
The Transport Corps is responsible for procurement, management and maintenance of soft-skinned vehicles, and maintenance of armoured vehicles. It is also responsible for the driving standards, training and certification, as well as providing vehicle fuels and lubricants, and certain logistics – such as heavy lift capabilities.

=== Medical Corps ===
The Medical Corps is responsible for promoting health and treating sick or wounded personnel, and has provided medical and dental support in all the Army's main UN missions. As with similar branches in other militaries, they also sometimes provide humanitarian assistance to local civilian populations – by giving medical aid where local health services are not functioning adequately.

=== Military Police Corps ===
The Military Police (Irish: Póilíní Airm, hence the nickname "PAs") are responsible for the prevention and investigation of offences, the enforcement of discipline and the general policing of the Defence Forces. In wartime, additional tasks include the provision of a traffic control organisation to allow rapid movement of military formations to their mission areas. Other wartime rules include control of prisoners of war and refugees. Traditionally, the Military Police have had involvement at State and ceremonial occasions. In recent years the Military Police have been deployed in UN missions (such as Iran and Iraq) and later in the former Yugoslavia (SFOR). The Gardaí assist in providing specialist police training to the Military Police in the field of crime investigation.

=== Communications & IT Corps ===
The Communications and Information Services (CIS) Corps is a support corps responsible for installing, maintaining and operating telecommunications equipment and information systems.

== Rank structure ==
The rank structure of the Irish Army is organised along standard military rank and command structures. These consist of the following ranks:

Officers

Rank group	General / flag officers			Senior officers			Junior officers
Irish Army
Irish Army	Lieutenant-general	Major-general	Brigadier-general	Colonel	Lieutenant-colonel	Commandant	Captain	Lieutenant	Second-Lieutenant
Irish Army	Lefteanant-ghinearál	Maor-ghinearál	Briogáidire-ghinearál	Cornal	Lefteanant-chornal	Ceannfort	Captaen	Lefteanant	Dara-lefteanant
Combat
Abbreviation	Lt Gen	Maj Gen	Brig Gen	Col	Lt Col	Comdt	Capt	Lt	2nd Lt	Cdt	Cdt

Other ranks

Rank group	Senior NCOs					Junior NCOs		Enlisted
Irish Army									No insignia
Irish Army	Sergeant major	Regimental Quartermaster Sergeant	Company sergeant	Company quartermaster sergeant	Sergeant	Corporal	Private, 3 star	Private, 2 star	Recruit
Irish Army	Maor-Sáirsint Cathláin/Reisimint (Note: Battalion (Cathlán), Regiment (Reisimint))	Ceathrúsháirsint Cathláin/Reisimint	Sáirsint Complachta (Note: Battery (Ceallraí) in the Artillery. Squadron (Scuadrún) in the Cavalry.)	Ceathrúsháirsint Complachta	Sáirsint	Ceannaire	Saighdiúir Singil, 3 Réalta	Saighdiúir Singil, 2 Réalta	Earcach
Combat
Abbreviation	BSM/RSM	BQMS/RQMS	CS/BS/SS	CQ/BQ/SQ	Sgt	Cpl	Pte/Gnr/Tpr 3*	Pte 2*	Rec

== Equipment ==
=== Weapons ===
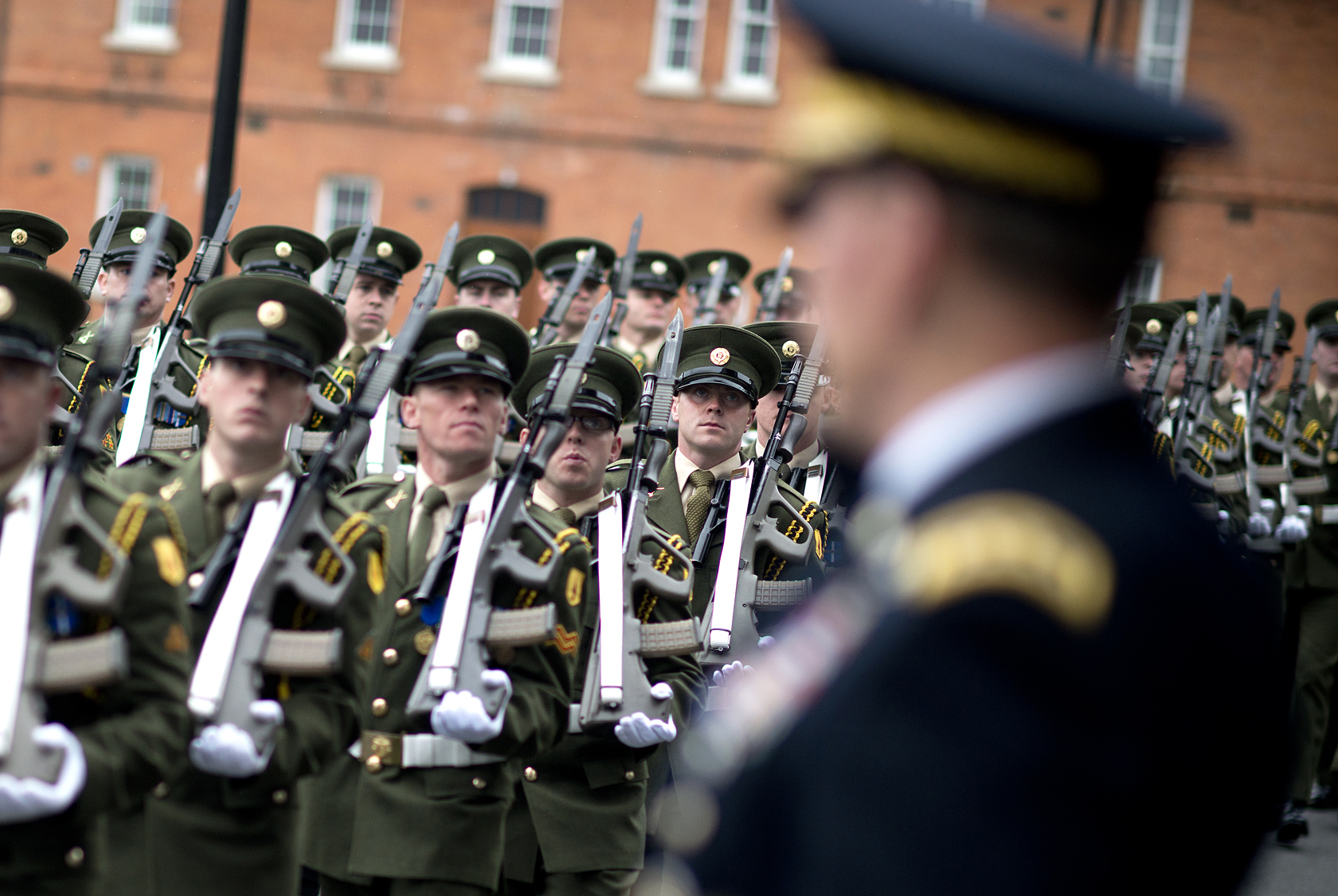
Army parade (march past) with Steyr AUG service rifles in service dress

The Army has historically purchased and used weapons and equipment from other western countries, mainly from Western European nations. Ireland has a very limited arms industry and rarely produces its own armaments.

From its establishment the Army used the British-made Lee–Enfield .303 rifle (in different versions), which would be the mainstay for many decades. In the 1960s some modernisation came with the introduction of the Belgian-made FN FAL 7.62 mm battle rifle. Since 1989 the service rifle for the Army is the Austrian-made Steyr AUG 5.56 mm assault rifle (used by all branches of the Defence Forces).

Other weapons in use by the Army include the USP 9mm pistol, M203 grenade launcher, FN MAG machine gun, M2 Browning machine gun, Accuracy International Arctic Warfare sniper rifles, AT4 SRAAW, FGM-148 Javelin anti-tank guided missile, L118 105mm Howitzer, and RBS 70 Surface to Air Missile system.

=== Vehicles ===
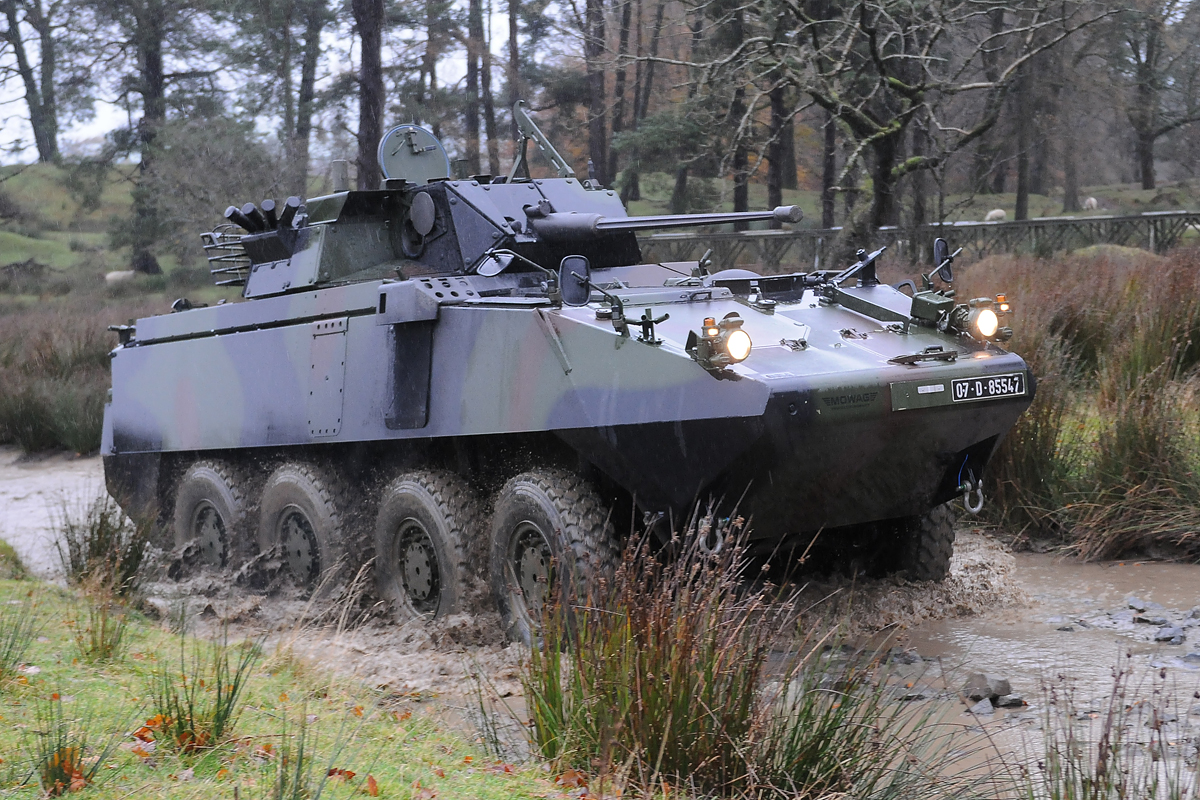
Irish Army Mowag Piranha IIIH MRV

The Army operates 80 Swiss made Mowag Piranha Armoured personnel carriers which are the Army's primary vehicle in the mechanized infantry role. These are equipped with 12.7 mm HMGs, or the Oto Melara 30 mm Autocannon.

In February 2026, as part of a modernisation program, it was announced that up to €600 million was budgeted to acquire "hundreds" of armoured vehicles from French arms manufacturers, such as Thales and KNDS, in an effort to "transform" the Irish Army from a light infantry force into a mechanised infantry force. Media reports suggested that the EBRC Jaguar armoured fighting vehicle, the VBMR Griffon armoured personnel carrier, the VBMR-L Serval multirole armoured vehicle or the CAESAR self-propelled howitzer could potentially be acquired, with some sources suggesting that delivery could be completed "before 2030".

== See also ==
- Modern Irish Army uniform
- Armoured fighting vehicles of the Irish Army
- Irish Defence Forces cap badge
- Defence Forces (Ireland)
- Reserve Defence Forces
- Irish Army deafness claims
- General Michael Joe Costello
- Colonel Daniel Bryan
- RACO - representative association for Commissioned Officers
- PDFORRA - representative association for Permanent Enlistees
- RDFRA - representative association for Reserve Enlistees

== Sources ==
- Perkins, James G. (29 September 2007). "Insignia Collection". Irish Military Insignia. Archived from the original on 13 September 2007.
