= James J. Quinn (Irish Army officer) =

James J. Quinn DSM (1918–1982) was a Major General in the Irish Army, and Force Commander for UNFICYP.

== Biography ==
Born in Roscrea County Tipperary in 1918, he joined the Irish Army as an officer cadet in 1938, and was commissioned in 1939. He served in the infantry throughout The Emergency. In 1950 he attended the British Army's Staff College in Camberley.

He served subsequently as instructor in Irish Military College, being promoted colonel in 1959. In that year he was appointed CO of the Irish Army's Sixth Brigade. He served with the United Nations in the Congo (ONUC) from 1961 to 1962. He saw further service with the United Nations in Cyprus (UNFICYP) in 1964.

Quinn was appointed GOC Curragh Command 1968 to 1972, and as GOC Eastern Command 1972 to 1976. He was appointed Assistant Chief of Staff in 1976. Later that year he was promoted to major general and appointed commander of UN Forces in Cyprus (UNFICYP), in which capacity he served until 1981. He was the first Irish Army general to command British troops, since Britain provided a battalion as its contribution to UNFICYP. Earlier, an Irish army battalion had served in UNFICYP when the force commander (Brigadier A.J. Wilson) was a British general. Returning to Ireland that year, he was awarded the Irish Distinguished Service Medal. He retired from the Irish Army in 1982, and died later that year.

== Sources ==
- An Cosantóir, the Irish Defence Journal
- A History of the Irish Army, John Duggan (1991)
- Irish Defence Forces Handbook (1988)
