= Sean Rooney =

Sean Rooney may refer to:

- Sean Rooney (volleyball) (born 1982), American volleyball player
- Sean Rooney (soccer) (born 1989), Australian soccer player
- Seán Rooney (soldier), Irish peacekeeper, killed in Lebanon in 2022

== See also ==
- Shaun Rooney (born 1996), Scottish footballer
