= Hugo MacNeill (Irish Army officer) =

Irish soldier (1896–1986)

Major General Hugo MacNeill
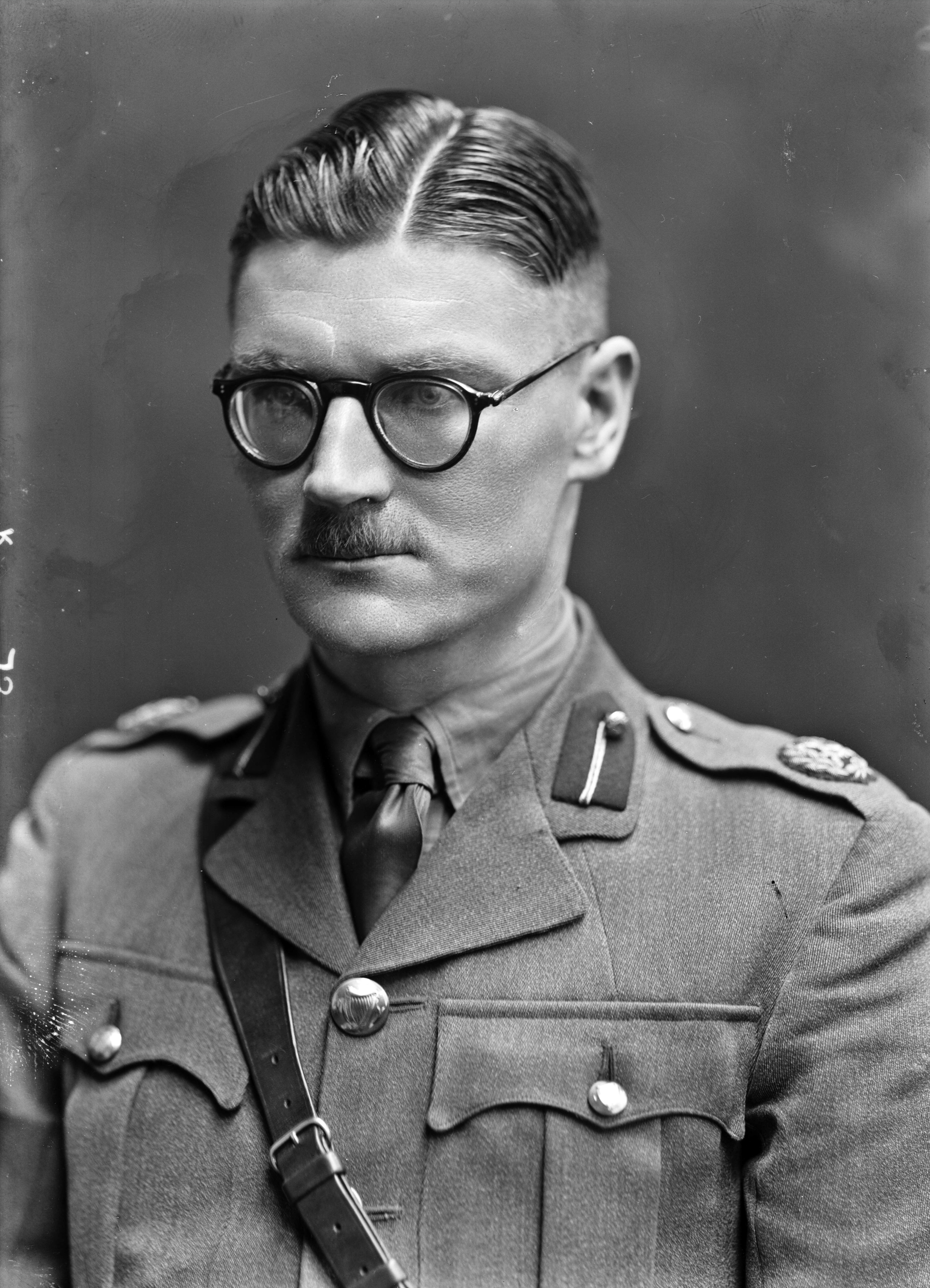
- Hugo MacNeill, between 1914-1923
- Born: 16 April 1900; Howth, Co. Dublin
- Died: 17 April 1963 (aged 63); Dún Laoghaire, Co. Dublin
- Burial place: Dean's Grange Cemetery, Dún Laoghaire, Co. Dublin
- Spouse: Margaret McKenna (m. 1924)
- Military service
- Allegiance: Irish Republic; Irish Free State; Republic of Ireland
- Service: Irish Volunteers; Irish Republican Army; National Army; Defence Forces (Ireland)
- Service years: 1913–1951
- Rank: Major General
- Commands: Adjutant General; Assistant Chief of Staff; Commandant, Military College; GOC, 2nd Division; GOC, Eastern Command
- Conflicts: Easter Rising; Irish War of Independence; Irish Civil War; The Emergency (Ireland)

Hugo Hyacinth MacNeill (16 Apr 1900 – 17 Apr 1963) was an Irish general officer.

== Life and military career ==
Born in 1900, he was the nephew of politician Eoin MacNeill (1867–1945).

Hugo MacNeill was member of Fianna Éireann and the Irish Volunteers before becoming an officer of the National Army during the Irish Civil War. In 1923, he was promoted to colonel after an intelligence windfall allowed him to prevent a series of Irish Republican Army (IRA) attacks in Dublin. In March 1924, McNeill led a party of troops to Devlin's Hotel in Parnell Street, Dublin to arrest army mutineers. In the aftermath of the Army Mutiny In the aftermath of the Army Mutiny, he was promoted to major general and appointed Adjutant-General, a position he held until October 1926. In 1926, he was sent on a mission with several other officers to visit US military installations. While there, he attended the US Army Command and Staff Course in Fort Leavenworth, Kansas. On his return he became Director of the Defence Plans Division in General Headquarters.

During the Emergency, he was placed in command of the 2nd Division in the north. Post war he became GOC Eastern Command before retiring in 1951. Following retirement, MacNeill co-ordinated the An Tóstal festivals in 1952-4 and was president of the Organisation of National Ex-Servicemen (ONE) in 1953. He died in 1963 and was buried in Dean's Grange Cemetery.

== Controversies ==
MacNeill was reputedly sympathetic to German interests, and some sources suggest he approached the German diplomatic legation in the early 1940s, without apparent authorisation. These approaches were reputedly to seek German assistance in the event that Britain invaded Ireland. British intelligence reported that MacNeill was "firm friends" with Eoin O'Duffy and an admirer "of German methods and efficiency".
