= List of Irish military casualties overseas =

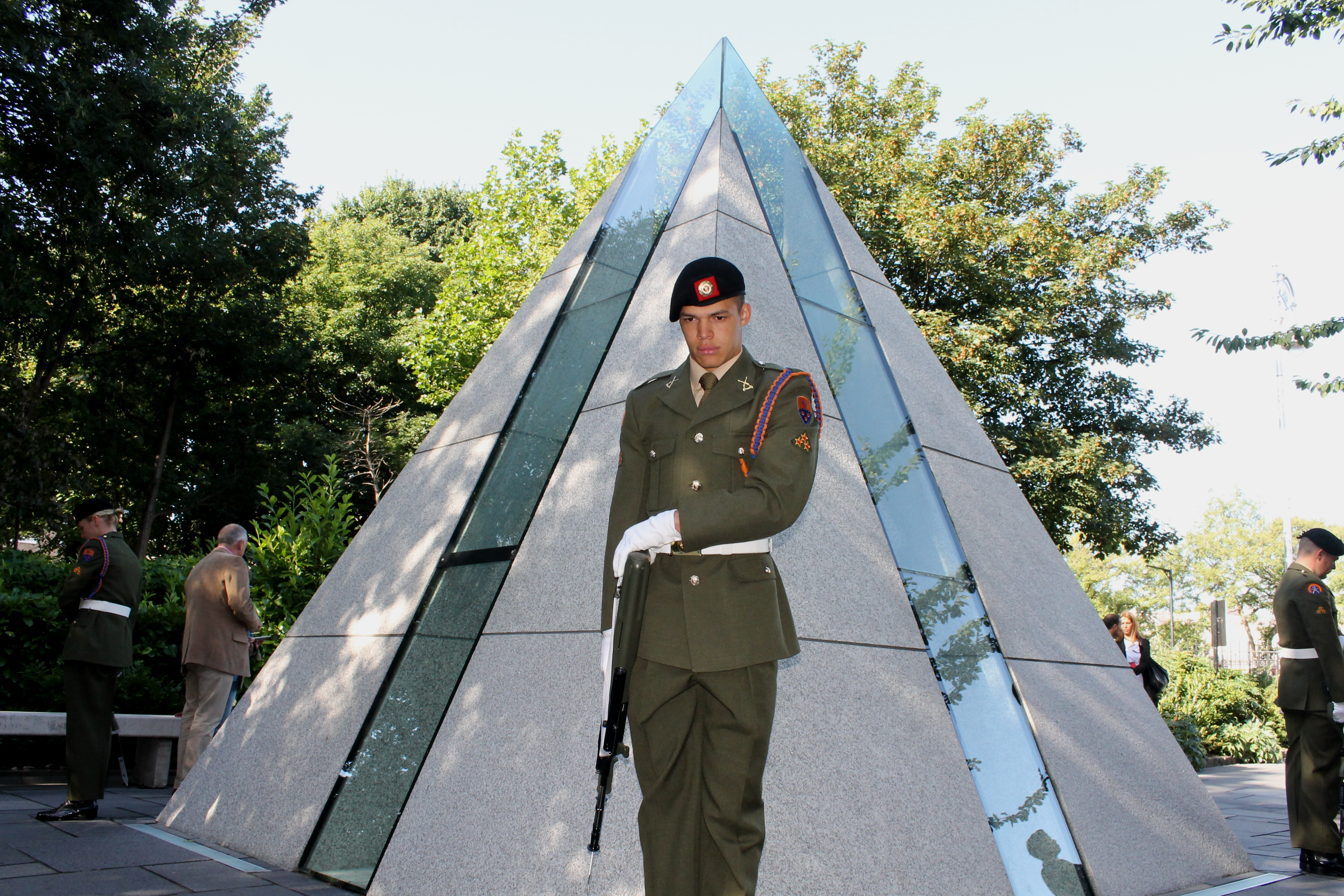
A Ceremonial Guard at the site of the National Memorial to members of the Defence Forces who died in the Service of the State, Merrion Square, Dublin

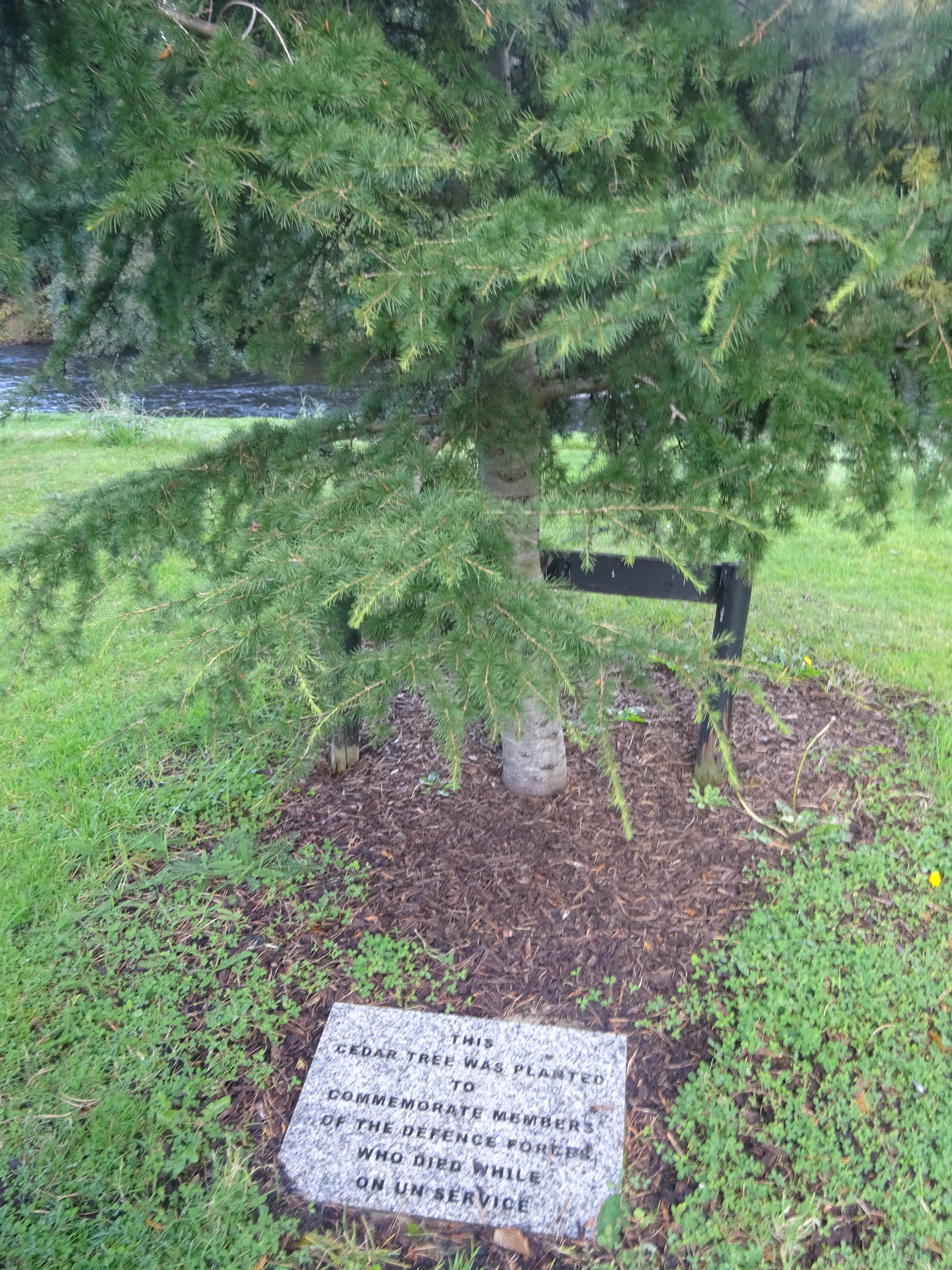
Lebanon cedar planted in Newbridge, County Kildare, Ireland to commemorate Irish soldiers who died on UN service.

This is a list of Irish military personnel of the Defence Forces who have died while serving overseas.

Since the 1960s, 88 personnel (87 from the Irish Army and one from the Air Corps) have died in overseas deployments.

Fatalities have primarily occurred as part of United Nations peacekeeping missions, with 26 lives lost in the Congo under ONUC; 9 in Cyprus under UNFICYP; two in the Middle East under UNTSO; 47 in Lebanon under UNIFIL; one in East Timor under UNTAET; one in Liberia under UNMIL and two in Europe under the EU Nordic Battlegroup and EUMS.

== Irish Defence Forces Roll of Honour ==
Surname	First Name	Service Number	Rank	Mission	Overseas Unit	Date of death	Home Unit	Age
Grant	Felix	80322	Coy Sgt (DSM)	ONUC	33 Inf	3 October 1960	12 Inf Bn	
McCarthy	Justin	O.4350	Col (DSM)	ONUC	HQ ONUC	27 October 1960	HQ 4 BDE	
Gleeson	Kevin	O.7500	Lt	ONUC	33 Inf Bn	8 November 1960	2 FD COE	
Gaynor	Hugh	804359	Sgt	ONUC	33 Inf Bn	8 November 1960	2 Mot Sqn	
Kelly	Peter	809839	Cpl	ONUC	33 Inf Bn	8 November 1960	5 Inf Bn	
Dougan	Liam	808234	Cpl	ONUC	33 Inf Bn	8 November 1960	5 Inf Bn	
Farrell	Matthew	804536	Pte	ONUC	33 Inf Bn	8 November 1960	2 Hosp Coy	
Fennell	Thomas	804548	Tpr	ONUC	33 Inf Bn	8 November 1960	2 Mot Sqn	
Browne	Anthony	806115	Tpr (MMG)	ONUC	33 Inf Bn	8 November 1960	2 Mot Sqn	
McGuinn	Michael	802900	Pte	ONUC	33 Inf Bn	8 November 1960	2 FD COE	
Killeen	Gerard	810242	Pte	ONUC	33 Inf Bn	8 November 1960	CTD (E)	
Davis	Patrick	806785	Pte	ONUC	33 Inf Bn	10 November 1960	2 FD COE	
Kelly	Liam	806855	Cpl	ONUC	33 Inf Bn	24 December 1960	3 Inf Bn	
Kelly	Luke	422602	Cpl	ONUC	HQ ONUC	30 August 1961	DEP MPC	
Gaffney	Edward	808594	Tpr	ONUC	35 Inf Bn	13 September 1961	1 ACS	
Mullins	Patrick	810552	Tpr	ONUC	35 Inf Bn	15 September 1961	1 Mot Sqn	
Nolan	Michael	806566	Cpl	ONUC	35 Inf Bn	15 September 1961	1 Tnk Sqn	
Fallon	Michael	810568	Cpl	ONUC	36 Inf Bn	8 December 1961	5 Inf Bn	
Mulcahy	Patrick	87410	Sgt (DSM)	ONUC	36 Inf Bn	16 December 1961	6 Fd Arty Regt	
Wickham	Andrew	812054	Pte (DSM)	ONUC	36 Inf Bn	16 December 1961	2 Inf Bn	
Riordan	Patrick	O.7776	Lt	ONUC	36 Inf Bn	16 December 1961	5 Inf Bn	
Geoghegan	John	87602	Cpl	ONUC	36 Inf Bn	28 December 1961	15 Inf Bn	
Power	John	811849	Cpl	ONUC	36 Inf Bn	7 March 1962	CTD (E)	
McCann	Ronald	O.6769	Capt	ONUC	HQ ONUC	9 May 1962	CTD (W)	
McGrath	John	80453	Cpl	ONUC	38 Inf Bn	21 March 1963	4 Hosp Coy	
McMahon	Thomas	O.6536	Comdt	ONUC	HQ ONUC	28 September 1963	HQ W	
MacAuley	Wallace	87770	Coy Sgt	UNFICYP	41 Inf Bn	22 February 1965	DEP MPC	
Hamill	John	99093	Sgt	UNFICYP	4 Inf Gp	7 April 1965	Dep Cav	
Hetherington	Willam	815345	Cpl	UNFICYP	4 Inf Gp	19 July 1965	CTD (E)	
Ryan	James	405923	Coy Sgt	UNFICYP	6 Inf Gp	4 October 1966	5 Inf Bn	
McNamara	Christoper	O.7778	Capt	UNFICYP	9 Inf Gp	16 January 1968	2 Grn S&T Coy	
Fagan	James	808052	Cpl	UNFICYP	10 Inf Gp	10 June 1968	2 Mot Sqn	
Byrne	Ronald	O.8006	Lt	UNFICYP	11 Inf Gp	28 October 1968	4 Inf Bn	
Kennedy	Michael	817553	Tpr	UNFICYP	12 Inf Gp	1 July 1969	1 ACS	
Cummins	Brendan	818694	Pte	UNFICYP	20 Inf Gp	11 June 1971	2 Inf Bn	
Wickham	Thomas	O.6374	Comdt	UNTSO		7 June 1967	HQ C Comd	
Nestor	Michael	O.8181	Comdt	UNTSO		25 September 1982	Mil Col	36
Moon	Gerard	836707	Pte	UNIFIL	43 Inf Bn	25 August 1978	4 Inf Bn	18
Reynolds	Thomas	829745	Cpl	UNIFIL	44 Inf Bn	24 December 1978	2 Grn S&T Coy	35
Grogan	Philip	839148	Pte	UNIFIL	HQ UNIFIL	10 July 1979	28 Inf Bn	19
Griffin	Stephen	830497	Pte	UNIFIL	46 Inf Bn	16 April 1980	1 Fd Engr Coy	21
Barrett	Thomas	830818	Pte	UNIFIL	46 Inf Bn	18 April 1980	4 Inf Bn	30
Smallhorne	Derek	828468	Pte	UNIFIL	46 Inf Bn	18 April 1980	5 Inf Bn	31
Yeates	Edward	813376	Sgt	UNIFIL	47 Inf Bn	31 May 1980	2 Mot Sqn	43
Duffy	Vincent	841137	Cpl	UNIFIL	47 Inf Bn	18 October 1980	6 Fd Sig Coy	37
Marshall	John	838549	Pte	UNIFIL	48 Inf Bn	17 December 1980	6 Fd S&T Coy	20
Martin	James	815518	Coy Sgt	UNIFIL	3 Ir Comp	9 February 1981	4 Grn MP Coy	37
Seoighe	Caoimhín	841579	Pte	UNIFIL	48 Inf Bn	27 April 1981	1 Cn Cois (1 Inf Bn)	20
Doherty	Hugh	840638	Pte	UNIFIL	49 Inf BN	27 April 1981	28 Inf Bn	20
Byrne	Niall	837731	Pte	UNIFIL	49 Inf Bn	22 June 1981	6 Inf Bn	21
Hodges	Gerard	826828	Pte	UNIFIL	50 Inf Bn	20 March 1982	CTD (S)	33
Burke	Peter	843152	Pte	UNIFIL	51 Inf Bn	27 October 1982	5 Inf Bn	20
Morrow	Gregory	841689	Cpl	UNIFIL	52 Inf Bn	27 October 1982	2 Inf Bn	20
Murphy	Thomas	843886	Pte	UNIFIL	52 Inf Bn	27 October 1982	2 Inf Bn	19
Murray	George	843587	Cpl	UNIFIL	55 Inf Bn	9 October 1984	2 Grn MP Coy	21
Fogarty	Paul	844963	Tpr	UNIFIL	59 Inf Bn	20 July 1986	1 Tnk Sqn	23
Murphy	Aonghus	O.9222	Lt	UNIFIL	59 Inf Bn	21 August 1986	12 Inf Bn	25
O'Brien	William	850413	Pte	UNIFIL	60 Inf Bn	6 December 1986	6 Inf Bn	25
McLoughlin	Dermot	848100	Cpl	UNIFIL	60 Inf Bn	10 January 1987	28 Inf Bn	33
Fitzgerald	John	830670	RSM	UNIFIL	15 Ir Comp	24 February 1987	1 Fd Arty Regt	47
Bolger	George	828854	Cpl	UNIFIL	61 Inf Bn	29 August 1987	12 Inf Bn	34
Cullen	Paul	851307	Gnr	UNIFIL	62 Inf Bn	17 March 1988	2 Fd Arty Regt	20
Wright	Patrick	848545	Pte	UNIFIL	63 Inf Bn	21 August 1988	27 Inf Bn	47
McNeela	Michael	851275	Pte	UNIFIL	64 Inf Bn	24 February 1989	27 Inf Bn	21
Heneghan	Fintan	844701	Cpl	UNIFIL	64 Inf Bn	21 March 1989	1 Cn Cois (1 Inf Bn)	29
Walsh	Thomas	844789	Pte	UNIFIL	64 Inf Bn	21 March 1989	28 Inf Bn	29
Armstrong	Mannix	843237	Pte	UNIFIL	64 Inf Bn	21 March 1989	28 Inf Bn	26
Forrester	Charles	837612	Sgt	UNIFIL	65 Inf Bn	21 May 1989	2 Fd Arty Regt	37
O'Hanlon	Michael	O.8527	Comdt	UNIFIL	66 Inf Bn	21 November 1989	HQ C Comd	39
McCarthy	Michael	848020	Cpl	UNIFIL	70 Inf Bn	15 November 1991	4 Inf Bn	33
Ward	Peter	843715	Cpl	UNIFIL	71 Inf Bn	29 September 1992	6 Inf Bn	29
Tynan	Martin	842626	Cpl	UNIFIL	72 Inf Bn	13 December 1992	DEP MPC	30
Stokes	Kieran	830851	CQMS	UNIFIL	28 Ir Comp	14 June 1993	Mil Col	39
O'Connor	Stephen	848554	Armn	UNIFIL	73 Inf Bn	3 October 1993	Admin Wing AC	32
Lynch	John	846385	Sgt	UNIFIL	36 Ir Comp	6 August 1997	HQ C Comd	34
Dowling	Michael	851719	Cpl	UNIFIL	83 Inf Bn	16 September 1998	30 Inf Bn	31
Barrett	Kevin	856952	Pte	UNIFIL	84 Inf Bn	18 February 1999	28 Inf Bn	20
Kedian	Billy	856310	Pte	UNIFIL	85 Inf Bn	31 May 1999	1 Cn Cois (1 Inf Bn)	21
Campbell	Jonathan	854526	Tpr	UNIFIL	85 Inf Bn	5 September 1999	4 Cav Sqn	28
Deere	Declan	857259	Pte	UNIFIL	86 Inf Bn	14 February 2000	3 Inf Bn	21
Fitzpatrick	Brendan	857331	Pte	UNIFIL	86 Inf Bn	14 February 2000	3 Inf Bn	19
Lawlor	Matthew	857266	Pte	UNIFIL	86 Inf Bn	14 February 2000	3 Inf Bn	23
Murphy	Jonathan	857271	Pte	UNIFIL	86 Inf Bn	14 February 2000	3 Inf Bn	21
Ó Flaithearta	Peadar	858175	Pte	UNTAET	8 Ircon	15 April 2002	1 Cn Cois (1 Inf Bn)	21
Mooney	Derek		Sgt	UNMIL	90 Inf Bn	27 November 2003	ARW	33
Delaney	Paul	O.8862	Lt Col	EU/NBG	J5 Branch	23 July 2007	4 W Bde	
Griffin	John ‘Jack’	O.9611	Lt Col	EUMS (Note: Died in Ireland while on leave from Brussels posting)		31 October 2015	J2 Branch	47
Rooney	Seán	869674	Pte	UNIFIL	121 Inf Bn	14 December 2022	27 Inf Bn	24

== Fatalities by mission ==
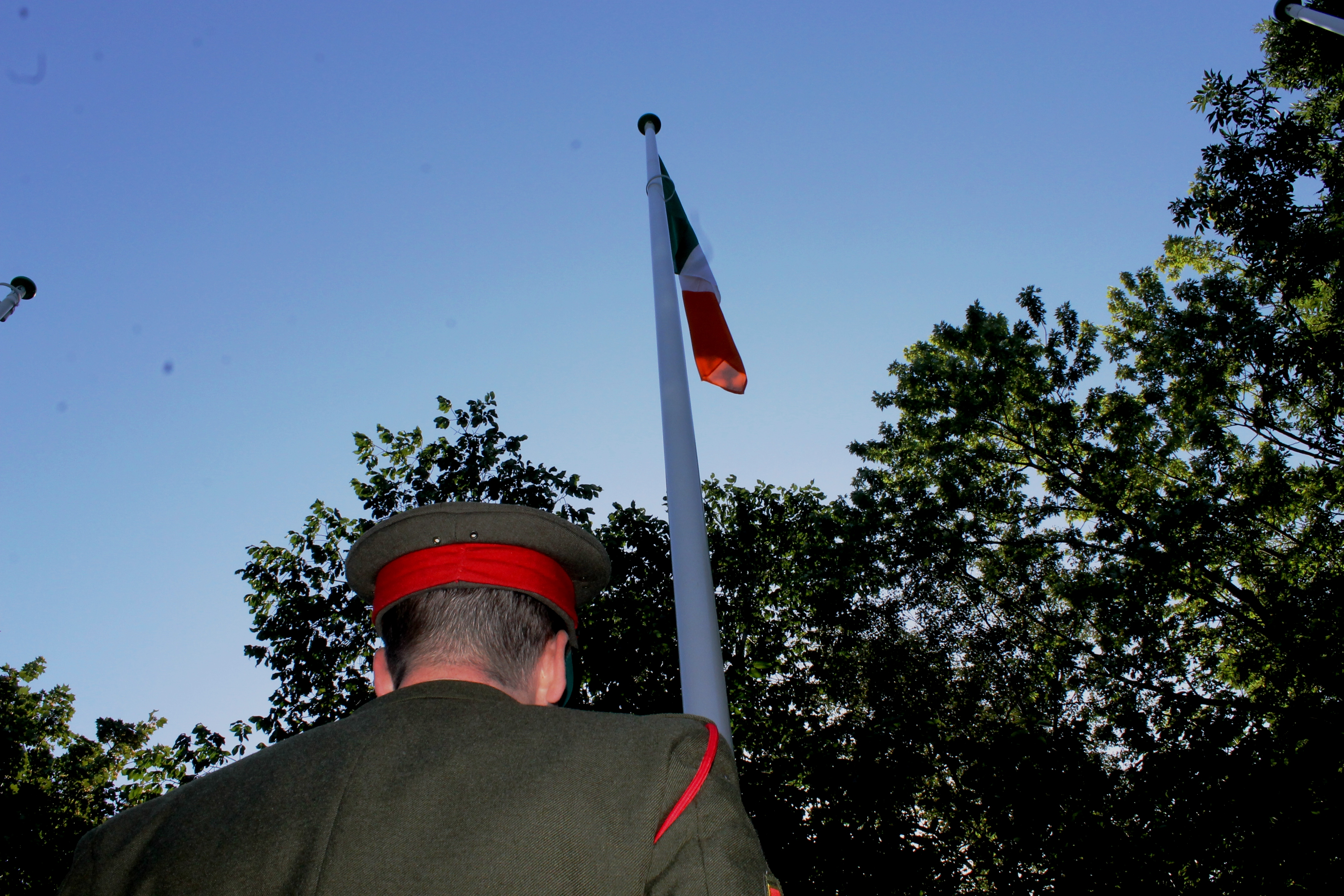
An MP stands on duty below the national flag at the National Memorial

Mission	Date of deaths	No. of Deaths
ONUC (mission ended)	1960–1963	26
UNFICYP (involvement ended)	1965–1971	9
UNTSO (ongoing)	1967–1982	2
UNIFIL (ongoing)	1978–2022	47
UNTAET (mission ended)	2002	1
UNMIL (mission ended)	2003	2
EU Nordic Battlegroup (ongoing)	2007	1

== See also ==
- List of Gardaí killed in the line of duty
- Killing of Seán Rooney
