= 2nd Division (Ireland) =

- XX
- Active: 9 May 1941 – 1945
- Country: Ireland
- Branch: Irish Army
- Type: Infantry
- Size: Division
- Garrison/HQ: Carton House
- Nickname: Spearhead

Commanders
- Notable commanders: Major General Hugo MacNeill

The 2nd Division, nicknamed "Spearhead", was an infantry division in the Irish Army during the Second World War.

The division was one of two infantry divisions established by Ireland during the duration of the war. The authorisation for the creation of the division, along with the 1st Division, was granted by Minister for Defence Oscar Traynor on the 9th of May, 1941 as part of military expansion. The division was initially headquartered at Dublin, but shortly after at Carton House, Maynooth for the duration of the war; tasked with defending the Northern Ireland border.

== Origins ==
Following the declaration of state emergency by the de Valera government in 1939, efforts were made for military expansion. However, there was no grave concern until the Fall of France in 1940, after which the neutral status of Ireland was in peril. Prior to the outbreak of war in December 1937, it was estimated that a force of three divisions would be necessary to defend Ireland in the event of an invasion. However, by September 1939, only two reinforced brigades (gravely understrength) were raised. By early 1941, seven brigades were mobilised — just over 40,000 men.

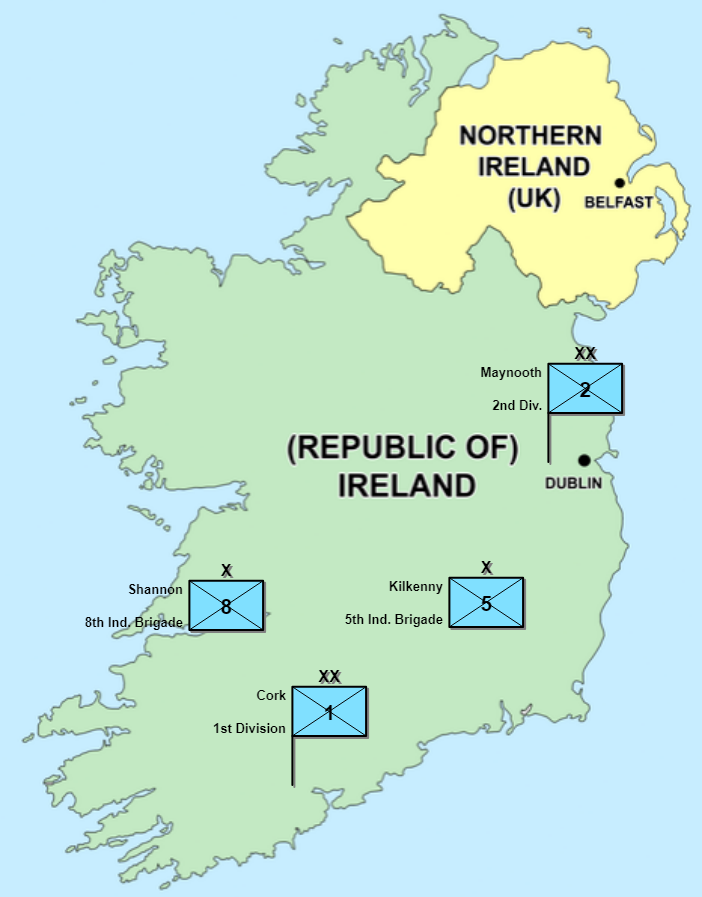
General Order of Battle, November 1943

The question of divisions was put forth at the start of 1941, and so the decision to authorise the establishment of two divisions was given by Oscar Traynor, then Minister for Defence on the 9th of May, 1941. Six of the brigades would be organised into two divisions, thus leaving an independent brigade (the 5th) to be subordinated to the Curragh Command.

== Organisation ==
The division was organised as follows:

- 2nd Brigade, based in Cathal Brugha Barracks, Dublin
  - 2nd Infantry Battalion
  - 5th Infantry Battalion
  - 11th (Dublin) Infantry Battalion
  - 2nd Field Artillery Regiment
  - 2nd Motor Squadron
- 4th Brigade, based in Mullingar
  - 6th (Dublin) Infantry Battalion
  - 8th (Thomand) Infantry Battalion
  - 20th Infantry Battalion
  - 4th Field Artillery Regiment
  - 4th Motor Squadron
- 6th Brigade, based in Collins Barracks, Dublin
  - 7th (Dublin) Infantry Battalion
  - 18th Infantry Battalion
  - 22nd Infantry Battalion
  - 6th Field Artillery Regiment
  - 6th Motor Squadron

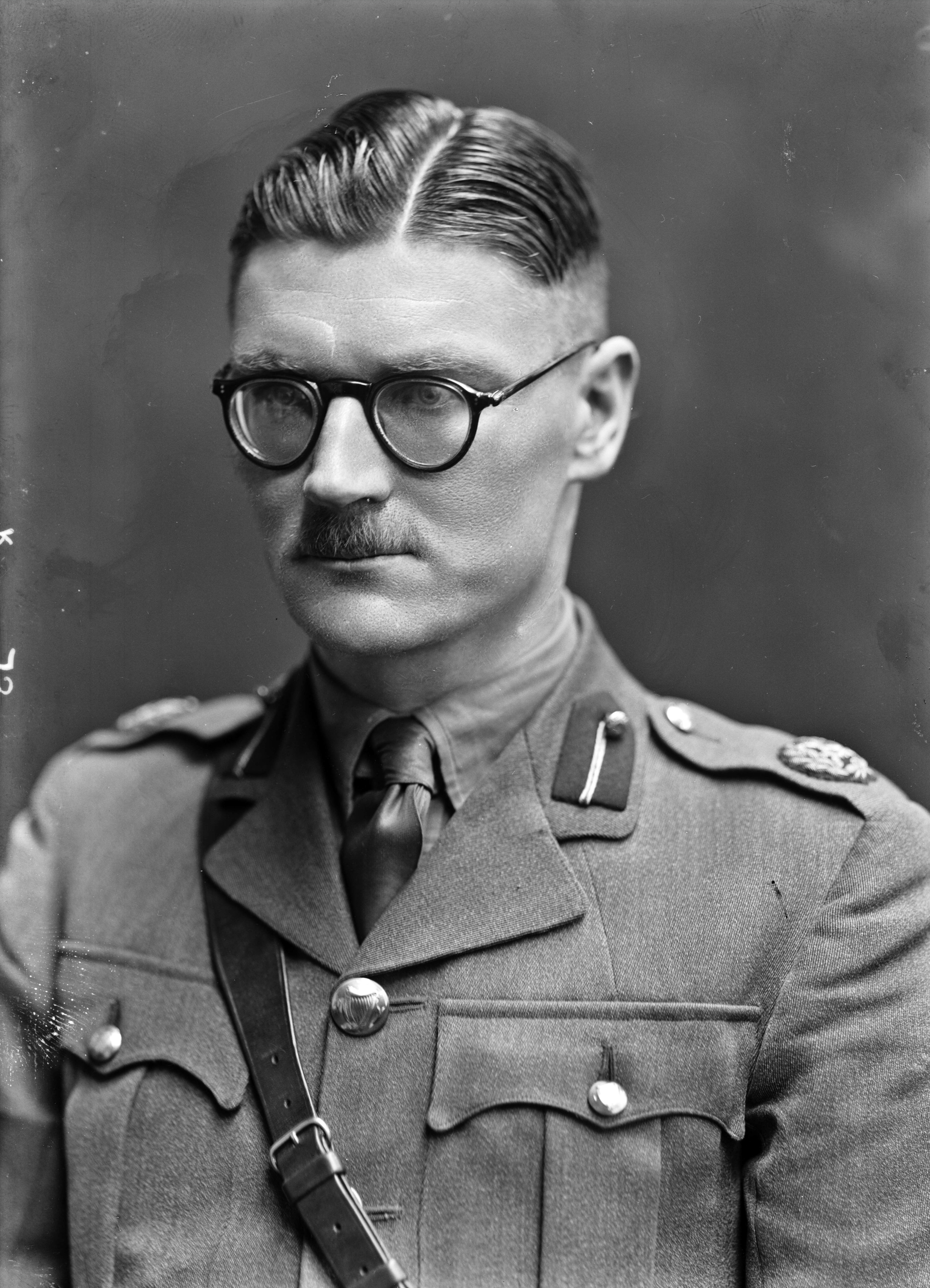
Major General Hugo MacNeill

Each brigade also consisted of field companies of engineers, signals, supply & transport; a field medical company; and military police.

In addition to these units, the division was given two Armoured Squadrons (which serviced armoured cars and light tanks) as well as several cyclist squadrons (for anti-paratrooper operations).

Major General Hugo MacNeill, then Assistant Chief of Staff of the Army, was appointed command of the division. Experienced with training from the United States and head of the Temporary Plans Division, MacNeill was regarded as a "forward-thinker". Being from Northern Ireland, MacNeill was ardently anti-British and, in the 1930s, was among other army leaders in calls for a war with Britain - and even approached German intelligence on several occasions.
