= 1st Division (Ireland) =

Military unit of the 1st Division, Irish Army WWII

- XX
- Active: 9 May 1941 – 1945
- Country: Ireland
- Branch: Irish Army
- Type: Infantry
- Size: Division
- Garrison/HQ: Collins Barracks, Cork
- Nickname: Thunderbolt

Commanders
- Notable commanders: Maj. Gen. Michael J. Costello

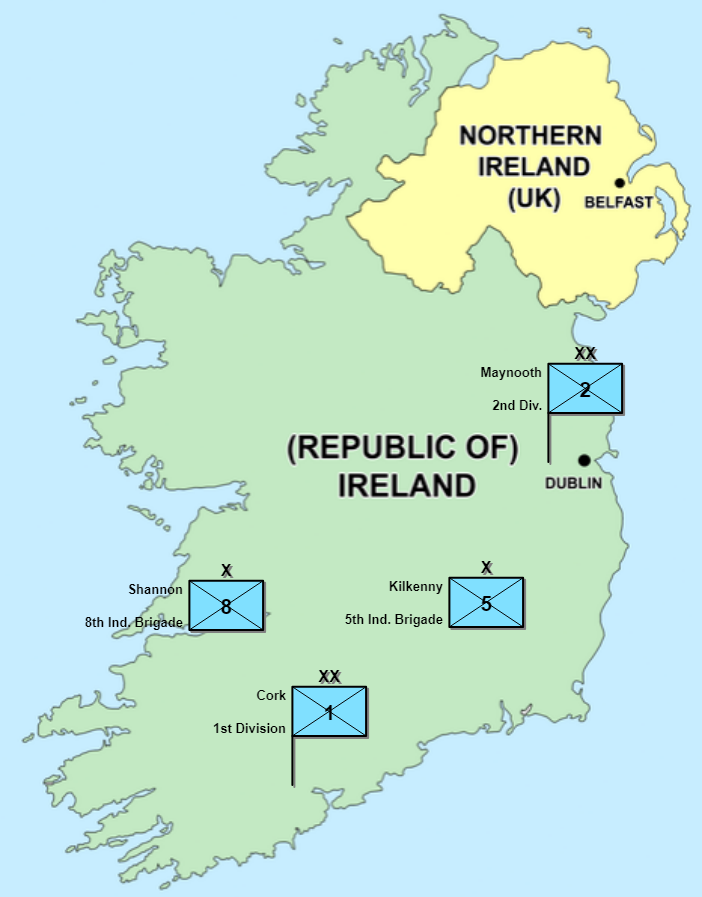
General Order of Battle, November 1943

The 1st Division, nicknamed "Thunderbolt", was an infantry division in the Irish Army during the Second World War.

The division was one of two infantry divisions established by Ireland during the duration of the war. The authorisation for the creation of the division, along with the 2nd Division, was granted by Minister for Defence Oscar Traynor on the 9th of May, 1941 as part of military expansion. The division was headquartered at Collins Barracks, Cork as part of the Southern Command.

== Origins ==
Following the declaration of state emergency by the de Valera government in 1939, efforts were made for military expansion. However, there was no grave concern until the Fall of France in 1940, after which the neutral status of Ireland was in peril. Prior to the outbreak of war in December 1937, it was estimated that a force of three divisions would be necessary to defend Ireland in the event of an invasion. However, by September 1939, only two reinforced brigades (gravely understrength) were raised. By early 1941, seven brigades were mobilised — just over 40,000 men.

The question of divisions was put forth at the start of 1941, and so the decision to authorise the establishment of two divisions was given by Oscar Traynor, then Minister for Defence on the 9th of May, 1941. Six of the brigades would be organised into two divisions, thus leaving an independent brigade (the 5th) to be subordinated to the Curragh Command.

== Organisation ==
The division was organised as follows:

- 1st Brigade, based in Clonmel
  - 10th (Uisneach) Infantry Battalion
  - 13th (Connacht) Infantry Battalion
  - 21st Infantry Battalion
  - 1st Field Artillery Regiment
  - 1st Motor Squadron
- 3rd Brigade, based in Cork
  - 4th Infantry Battalion
  - 19th Infantry Battalion
  - 31st Infantry Battalion
  - 3rd Field Artillery Regiment
  - 3rd Motor Squadron
- 7th Brigade, based in Limerick
  - 9th (Desmond) Infantry Battalion
  - 12th (Desmond) Infantry Battalion
  - 15th Infantry Battalion
  - 7th Field Artillery Regiment
  - 7th Motor Squadron

Each brigade also consisted of field companies of engineers, signals, supply & transport; a field medical company; and military police.

In addition to these units, the division was given two Armoured Squadrons (which serviced armoured cars and light tanks) as well as several cyclist squadrons (for anti-paratrooper operations).

Col. Michael J. Costello was promoted to Major General and appointed commander in May; a man reported to be a "down to earth soldier" and prepared his division to a high state of readiness. His division was, counterintuitively, not subordinated to the Southern Command (which was under the command of Col. J. Hanrahan). These regional commands, which had been supplemented with brigades before the divisional-level organisation, were given various battalions, mobile squadrons and static establishments (or garrison companies).

== Unit History ==
Over the course of the war, the division was primarily training and garrisoning key areas in the south of Ireland. Large-scale field exercises, named the Blackwater Exercises were held in the August and September 1942, when the 1st Division engaged the 2nd Division in various attack and defence exercises. Over 20,000 troops and 1,500 vehicles partook in the exercises — the largest manoeuvres ever undertaken by the Irish Defence Forces. The results were satisfactory, with drawbacks including the area of supply — remedied by further training in this area.

To quote Maj. Gen. Costello:

Given the inadequate armament and signal equipment of the Forces, training concentrated on attaining superiority over a potential invader in night operations with small forces expected to yield capture of enemy arms and ammunition, in cross country mobility and in marksmanship and the use of mines and explosives generally. The platoons made silent advances during dark nights over difficult and unknown country.

Despite rather poor pay and sub-par living conditions, morale remained high throughout the Emergency.
