= April 2026 attack on French UNIFIL peacekeepers in Lebanon =

On 18 April 2026, an attack on French UNIFIL peacekeeper patrol took place in Southern Lebanon. One French soldier, Sergeant Florian Montorioum, was killed. The incident took place during a ceasefire between Lebanon and Israel and while peace talks were in progress.

== Background ==
Since established in 1978, France has been one of the major contributors to the United Nations Interim Force in Lebanon. The force is mandated to monitor and the border between Lebanon and Israel while maintaining security in Southern Lebanon.

== Attack ==
On 18 April 2026, while trying to reach a United Nation outpost in Al-Ghandouriyah, a French UNIFIL patrol doing reconnaissance activity was ambushed and attacked in Southern Lebanon. In the attack, one French soldier, Sergeant Florian Montorioum, was killed, and three others were injured, two of them seriously.

== Responsibility ==
According to French officials, including French President Emmanuel Macron, the evidence suggests Hezbollah was responsible for the deadly attack. UNIFIL joined the accusation pointing at Hezbollah. The organization denies the attack was done by them, calling for an investigation of the incident.

== Reactions ==
The attack was condemned by United Nations Secretary Antonio Guterres, French President Macron, and Lebanese president Joseph Aoun and Prime Minister Nawaf Salam.

Hezbollah denied responsibility for the attack, calling for an investigation of the incident.

== See also ==
- Killing of Seán Rooney
- 2026 Lebanon war
- Hezbollah–Israel conflict (2023–present)
