= Organisation of National Ex-Servicemen =

Irish military veterans' charity

Flag of the Defence Forces Organisation of National Ex-Servicemen

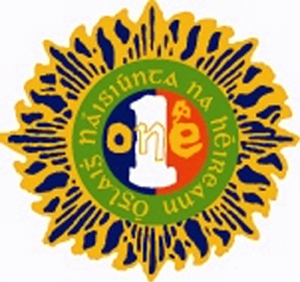
ONET Logo 1950 – Present

The Organisation of National Ex-Servicemen and Women (Irish: Óglaigh Náisiúnta Na hÉireann) is a support organisation for ex-service personnel of the Irish Defence Services.

The organisation commenced operations in approximately 1950 and was formed as an amalgam of a number of ex-servicemen's organisations which had sprung up after soldiers, sailors and airmen had been 'demobbed' following service during the Emergency. The emergency spanned the period 1939 to 1946 which was approximately the same period as the Second World War and over 140,000 soldiers, sailors, airmen, police and red cross personnel served in the Irish Defence Forces at this time. The National Federation of Irish Ex-Servicemen and the Association of Regular Ex-Servicemen (Defence Forces) being just two of the organisations that came together. This was the first time that a unified veterans organisation had formed in Ireland.

== Formation and name ==
Cap badge of the Defence Forces.

The initial name for the organisation was the "Irish Ex-Servicemen's Organisation". This was soon converted to the Irish "Óglaigh Náisiúnta na hÉireann". The new organisation adopted an emblem resembling the cap badge of the Defence Forces and incorporated the number 1 into its design signifying the amalgamation of the different groups. Since this time the Organisation has been known as the O.N.E. and ONE forms part of the Organisation's emblem to this date. The first President of the Organisation was Lieutenant General Michael Joe Costello, and the vice-Presidents were Senator Victor Carton PC, Lieutenant Colonel Fred O'Connor, Mr. Eoin O'Riain B.L. and Mr. Thomas Holt. Major Patrick J McDonagh was Chairman of the National Executive Committee and Commandant Peter Duffy was the Honorary National Secretary.

The organisation has been organised democratically since its inception and has held annual conventions from 1950 to 1999 to elect its National Executive Committee. From June 2000 onwards the organisation became a limited company with charitable status under the Companies Act 1963 following a special resolution placed before its members at an Extraordinary General Meeting held in Cobh, County Cork under the chairmanship of Mr Jack Gilmartin, a native of Dublin who lives in Cobh.

The newly formed company assumed 'Teoranta' meaning 'Limited' in Gaelic into its name and is now known as O.N.E.T. The newly formed company adopted a Memorandum of Association and Articles of Association (M&As) which govern how the company interacts with people, government agencies, etc. as well as setting out regulations governing the relationships between the shareholders and directors of the company. The company has no share capital but has limited liability. ONET's 'Handbook of Rules', which sets out membership criteria etc. remains intact but is subservient to the M&As.

== New departure ==
Board chairman Lt. Gen. Gerry McMahon

The first Chairman of the newly formed board of directors was Captain Patrick T. Rooney (Rtd) a native of Drogheda, County Louth. Capt. Rooney had over 37 years service with the 8th Battalion, FCA (Reserve Defence Force) stationed along the Border between the Republic and Northern Ireland in County Louth. The first company secretary was Mr. Pat Dunleavy a native of Mullingar, County Westmeath, who had served with the 4th Regiment in Mullingar, 2nd Garrison S&T, Transport Corps in Dublin and had seen service with the United Nations ONUC force in the Congo. Mr. Dunleavy was a long serving member of the Organisation who was the driving force behind the building of a home in Dublin for destitute soldiers, sailors and airmen. In October 2003 Mr. Joe Lynch, a native of Drogheda, was selected as the first chief executive officer (CEO) for the newly formed Company. The Company President is Martin Coyne Mullingar Branch and The chairman of the board stood down lately was Lt. General Gerry McMahon, retired Chief of Staff of the Defence Forces and native of Limerick while the current chief executive officer is Mr. Ollie O'Connor, a native of Drogheda.

The board of directors is elected directly by the members of ONET. There are currently fifteen members of the Board and each year five Board members must step down. These Board members may place themselves before the membership for re-election if they so wish. The Board, at its inaugural meeting, elects a Chairperson to serve until the next AGM. Any member of the charity may seek nomination and election to the Board. Members may vote in person at the Annual General Meeting (AGM) of the charity or submit their 'proxy vote' in advance of this meeting. The AGM normally takes place in Brú na bhFiann in the month of June.

== Homes ==
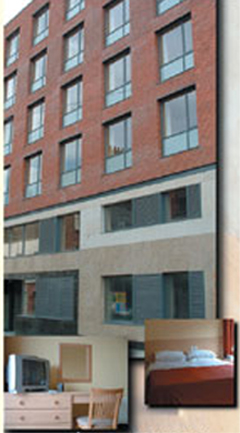
Bru na bhFiann, Dublin

During the late 1980s Ireland experienced a severe shortage of accommodation for less fortunate people and this was reflected in no small part in the Defence Community where a substantial number of Ex-Servicemen were living rough on the streets of Ireland's cities. During the winter of 1988/9 up to seven people died on the streets of Dublin through hypothermia among them were ex-servicemen. A small group of men who were members of the Organisation of National Ex-Servicemen and Women banded together under the leadership of Mr. Pat Dunleavy to raise awareness among members of the Defence Community and to raise funding for a soldier's home. In 1991 the planning reached a critical stage and with a concrete strategy in place building works commenced and were brought to fruition in 1994 when the then President Mrs. Mary Robinson opened the newly built 20 bedroom home called Brú na bhFiann, liberally translated from Gaelic as 'Home of the Brave'.

Since 1994 over five hundred ex-servicemen have been accommodated in the charity's homes throughout Ireland and many have moved on to independent living. From January 2002 to March 2005 Brú na bhFiann was temporarily located in Leeson Bridge House, Leeson Street Upper, Dublin. During this time ONET housed twenty four ex-servicemen and commenced provision of B&B style accommodation for serving and retired members of the Defence Forces and their families. This was seen as an integral part of ONET's strategy of integration with the Defence Forces. In March 2005 the residents and staff of Brú na bhFiann, the National HQ and all of ONET's records moved to the newly built Brú na bhFiann located in the redeveloped Smithfield Market complex.

== Vision and mission ==
President McAleese & Joe Lynch former CEO 2005

Since 2003 the board of directors has driven a plan which has disestablished the National Executive Committee in 2005 and has seen the Organisation grow from a base of one 20 bedroom home to an expanding portfolio of housing in three centres in Ireland under the direction of the former CEO, Joe Lynch and the current CEO, Ollie O'Connor. The old Brú na bhFiann was demolished during the redevelopment of Dublin's Smithfield Market and replaced with a state-of-the-art 40 bedroom complex, which was officially opened by the then President of Ireland and Patron of ONET, Mrs. Mary McAleese. The new home contains a reception, bar, kitchen, dining room capable of seating up to 90 people, laundry and administration offices.

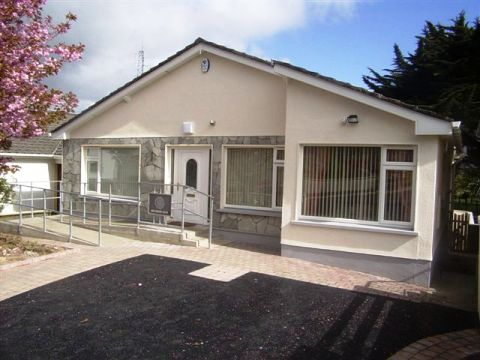
Beechwood House, Letterkenny

The two other homes that the charity owns and operates are located in Letterkenny, County Donegal, which has 7 bedrooms and Athlone, County Westmeath which has 8 bedrooms. The Letterkenny home is called Beechwood House and is located in Letterkenny Town itself. The home was purchased in 2003 and refurbished during 2004 using funding gained under the Irish Government's housing and anti poverty strategy, local donations and fundraising and from ONET's national funds. Beechwood House was ONET's second purchase and represented a major leap forward for the charity. The home was fully refurbished to the highest Health & Safety standards and delivers first class safe, affordable and comfortable accommodation to its residents since it was officially opened by Cllr Dessie Larkin, Letterkenny Town Mayor, in March 2004.

Custume House, Athlone

Custume House has a long history associated with the Custume Barracks and was, for many years, the home of the General Officer Commanding the Western Brigade. Negotiations for the purchase of the home from the Department of Defence concluded in 2005 and following a major investment from ONET which was again funded through the Irish Government's housing and anti poverty strategy, local donations and from ONET's national funds, the home was officially opened by the Minister for Defence, Willie O'Dea TD, in August 2006. Custume House is currently home to seven ex-servicemen.

All of the homes are managed and run by ONET on a charitable basis and are dependent on funding from serving and retired members of the Defence Forces and donations from the Department of Defence and Dublin City Council. ONET also accommodates serving and retired members of the Defence Forces and their families from Ireland and overseas in their Dublin home, Brú na bhFiann.

== UN Service ==
ONET Wreath Laying Ceremony

Ireland became a member of the United Nations in 1955. Since 1958, the Defence Forces has had a continuous presence on peacekeeping missions, mainly in the Middle East. The Congo was the first large scale involvement that Irish troops had abroad since the foundation of the Irish State. The Belgian Congo became an independent Republic on 30 June 1960. Twelve days later, the Congolese government requested military assistance from the United Nations to maintain its territorial integrity. The Irish government consented to a request from the Secretary General for a contingent of Irish troops to serve with the UN Force in the Congo, and so on 28 July 1960 the Defence Forces involvement in Africa began with the UN mission ONUC (UN Operation in Congo). Six thousand one hundred and ninety one Irish soldiers took part in the mission and twenty six were killed. The largest casualties were sustained on 8 November 1960 at Niemba when nine Irish UN peacekeepers were massacred. Irish involvement with the mission ended on 30 June 1964. Each year on the nearest Saturday to the anniversary of the Niemba Ambush ONET commemorates the event with a mass and wreath laying ceremony in Cathal Brugha Barracks, Rathmines, Dublin. The general public is invited to attend the event which normally commences with a parade from the main square in Cathal Brugha Barracks at 11.45 to St. Patrick's Church, also in Cathal Brugha Barracks, on the Saturday morning. Normally over 100 ex-servicemen and women take part in the event and dignitaries from the Defence Forces, Department of Defence and politicians from Ireland and abroad also take part in the ceremony.

Every year on Easter Sunday ONET commemorates deceased members of the Irish Defence Forces with a wreath laying ceremony in Arbor Hill, Dublin, where the 1916 Easter Rising burial plot is located. This annual event is called (in Irish) Lá na bhFiann. The event is normally attended by over one hundred ex-servicemen and women who have served their country both at home and abroad on UN service as well as members of the Defence Forces, Government officials, the Lord Mayor of Dublin, and members of the general public.

== Membership and communication ==
Membership of ONET is open to men and women who have served in the Permanent Defence Forces (PDF), Reserve Defence Forces (RDF), An Slua Muirí, An Fórsa Cosanta Áitiúil (FCÁ), Maritime Inspection, Local Defence Force (LDF), Local Security Force (LSF), Coast Watching Service, Construction Corps, Irish Red Cross, or Civil Defence providing such person has had at least one-years satisfactory service and has been honourably discharged. The charity operates on a not-for-profit basis and all funds collected through subscription are applied to the running of the charity and the maintenance and upkeep of the charities homes. To become a member of the company a person must be accepted as a member of a branch and must sign a written declaration of acceptance of the Memorandum of Association & Articles of Association and the Handbook of Rules. Since the year 2000 membership has grown from a low ebb of 1,250 members to its current standing of over 1,700 members some of whom are located overseas in the US, Canada and Australia. Branches are organised throughout Ireland with one Branch located in London. ONET also operates a 'National Branch' to cater for Ex-Servicemen and Women who do not live close to a Branch (this includes overseas members). The ONET web site contains an on-line form to join the Organisation which must be printed and forwarded to the company secretary.

ONECONNECT is the quarterly magazine which is published by the charity and distributed to its members by post. It is a topical journal that updates members on the charity's activities for the previous quarter and also informs them of upcoming events. The journal is also used to publish the annual accounts for the organisation prior to the Annual General Meeting as well as distributing nomination papers and ballot papers for board of directors positions.

== Uniform ==
ONET members wear a distinctive uniform of Black Blazer with Branch Crest on the left breast, Charcoal Grey Slacks, White Shirt, Navy ONET Crested Tie, Black Shoes and Black Beret with ONET Cap Badge. There are two types of Branch Crest – plain embroidered cloth or Silk and wire. Either crest is acceptable. Medals awarded during service (including ONET service) are displayed on ceremonial occasions and are pinned over the left breast above the ONET Crest. Medals awarded to deceased family members may be worn over the right breast. ONET awards a service medal after three years and a service bar following seven years service with the company. Each Branch has an Irish National flag (Tri-Colour), Branch flag, which displays the ONET Company Crest and a UN flag, all of which are paraded when a local ceremony takes place. ONET is often called upon to perform ceremonial duties for fallen comrades at funeral ceremonies and Branches are frequently requested to take part in St. Patrick's Day Parades.
