= An Cosantóir =

Irish Defence Forces magazine

- Founder: Michael Joe Costello
- Founded: 1940
- Country: Ireland
- Language: English
- Website: military.ie

An Cosantóir (Irish pronunciation: [ənˠ ˈkɔsˠən̪ˠt̪ˠoːɾʲ]; meaning "The Defender") is the official magazine of the Irish Defence Forces. It was originally established in December 1940 by Colonel Michael Joe Costello as a means of disseminating training material among the Local Security Force (LSF), the forerunner to the Army Reserve, but later became the newspaper of Costello's First Division.

In its current form, An Cosantóir is a 40-page colour A4 size publication, issued 10 times per year. The magazine carries information on various elements of the Irish Defence Forces. Topics cover different aspects of military life, including training, overseas operations, new equipment, personalities, events, international military affairs, humanitarian work, unit activities, and military history.

An Cosantóir is published by the Public Relations Section, Defence Forces Headquarters (DFHQ) with offices at Ceannt Barracks in the Curragh Camp.

It has a monthly readership of around 25,000, and up to 45,000 readers online, and is sold in approximately 200 outlets around Ireland.

An Cosantóir holds an annual 10km road race event in the Phoenix Park in autumn for Permanent and Reserve Defence Forces personnel, Department of Defence staff, veterans and invited guests.

Back issues of An Cosantóir dating back to 1940 are available online.
