= Killing of Seán Rooney =

2022 Hezbollah attack

On 14 December 2022, a UN convoy heading towards Beirut Airport was attacked, resulting in the death of Private Seán Rooney and severely injuring Trooper Shane Kearney, while two other soldiers sustained minor injuries. The attack was allegedly carried out by members of the militant group Hezbollah. However, a spokesperson for Hezbollah denied responsibility for the attack. On 29 July 2025, Lebanon's military tribunal found six individuals guilty. The main defendant, Mohammad Ayyad, was sentenced to death in absentia along with a fine of approximately US $1,100.

== Background ==
Private Seán Rooney was a 23 year old Irish peacekeeper soldier who served with the 27 Infantry Battalion, alongside other Irish soldiers deployed to Lebanon. He was part of the UNIFIL force to Southern Lebanon.

== Attack ==
On 14 December 2022, Rooney was part of a UN convoy on the road to Beirut–Rafic Hariri International Airport. The marked armoured vehicle he was driving was ambushed near the village of Al‑Aqbiya, a town known to be a stronghold of Hezbollah. The force was trapped In a narrow street by a mob that included members of Hezbollah. Rooney was shot dead, while Private Shane Kearney (aged 22 at the time) was severely injured and medically evacuated to Ireland. Two other soldiers were treated for minor injuries. This attack marked the first deadly attack on UN forces in Lebanon since 2015, as well as the first Irish soldier to die while on duty in the last 20 years.

== Trial and verdict ==
Following the investigation of the attack, in 2023 a military tribunal in Lebanon accused five people for the killing of Seán Rooney. According to Al Jazeera "In some of the recordings of the confrontation, the gunmen reportedly could be heard telling the peacekeepers that they are from Hezbollah." The main suspect was identified as Mohamad Ayyad, while the other four were Ali Khalifeh, Ali Salman, Hussein Salman, and Mustafa Salman. Six people were tried and on July 29, 2025, all six were found guilty. Mohammad Ayyad, who was previously held by Lebanese authorities, was sentenced to death in absentia along with a fine of about US $1,100.

=== Reaction ===
Sinn Féin TD Ruairí Ó Murchú called on the Irish Government to “use all avenues” to pressure Lebanon to find Ayyad and urged the UN and Irish Defence Forces to share their investigation results with the Rooney family.

The Irish government, headed by Taoiseach Micheál Martin, strongly criticized the speed of the trial and the light verdict it issued. He added that it was unacceptable that the main person responsible still hadn't been caught. Tánaiste and Defence Minister Simon Harris also said he was disappointed.

UNIFIL stated they are satisfied with the outcome of the legal process and the Lebanese government.

== See also ==
- List of Irish military casualties overseas
- April 2026 attack on French UNIFIL peacekeepers in Lebanon
