= Niemba ambush =

Irish Army patrol (UN duty) in Congo-Léopoldville, 1960

- Part of the Congo Crisis
| Date | 8 November 1960 |
| Location | Niemba, Katanga 6°02′06″S 27°28′26″E |
| Result | Luba victory |

Belligerents
| (United Nations) ONUC: Ireland | Luba militia |

Commanders and leaders
| (Republic of Ireland) Kevin Gleeson † | Unknown |

Strength
| 11 men | ~100 men |

Casualties and losses
| 9 killed; 1 wounded | 25 killed; Unknown wounded |
- Location within Democratic Republic of the Congo Niemba ambush (Africa)

The Niemba ambush took place on 8 November 1960, when an Irish Army patrol in Congo-Léopoldville was ambushed, the first time the Irish Army was embroiled in battle since the 1922–23 Irish Civil War. Ireland had deployed troops as United Nations Operation in the Congo (ONUC) peacekeepers.

The notoriety of the attack, and the allegations of mutilation and cannibalism that circulated in the Irish popular press in its aftermath, led to the word "baluba" becoming a synonym for any "untrustworthy and barbaric" person in certain parts of Ireland.

However, the ambush was largely the result of mistaken identity. The Baluba people seem to have mistaken the Irish UN troops for European mercenaries in the service of the State of Katanga, with whom they had recently been in conflict, the Baluba being opposed to Katangese secession. The Irish were part of a UN contingent that was sent to halt the Katangese secession from the Congo.

== Background ==
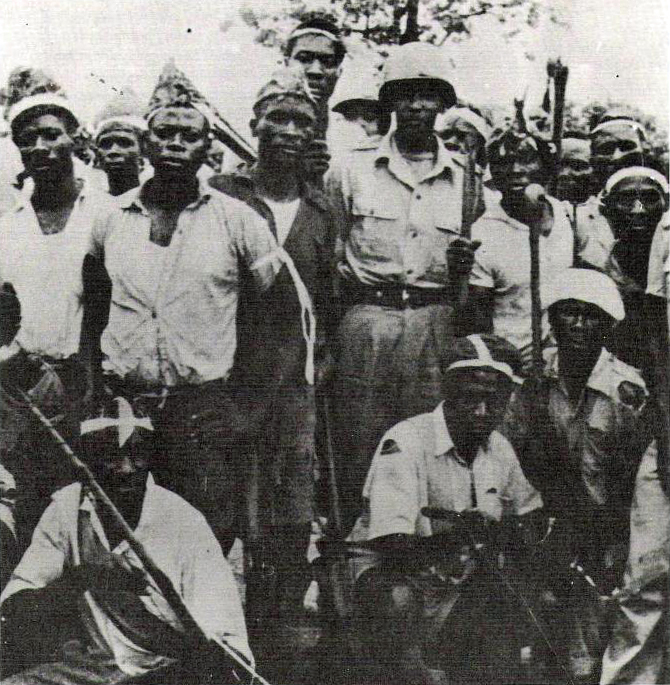
Baluba militiamen in 1962

After the Belgian Congo became independent (as Republic of the Congo) in 1960, a civil war broke out in Katanga, the southern, mineral-rich province of the Congo. An independence movement was fueled by mining companies who sought to continue their control of the resources in the region, as well as by local grievances. A local political leader, Moïse Tshombe declared Katanga an independent state.

United Nations peacekeeping troops were invited to help restore order and to end the Katanga secession. Ireland, as well as Sweden and other European nations, supplied troops as part of the UN force. Ireland had applied for membership of the United Nations in 1946, but because of Irish neutrality during World War II this had been vetoed by the Soviet Union until the end of 1955. The Irish Army was therefore anxious to become involved in ONUC and thereby validate Ireland's recent membership, but was unprepared in terms of experience, training, uniforms, arms and vehicles, and was generally reliant on interpreters.

The Luba people or "Baluba" ethnic group did not support the Katangese secession. As a result, they came under attack from pro-Katangese and allied forces. The area around the railway station at Niemba suffered several raids by both Baluba and local Pygmy tribes. On 4 October, several villages were attacked by Katangese gendarmes and European mercenaries and many Baluba were massacred. This left them suspicious of and hostile to any white European troops. Most surrounding villages had been deserted by their inhabitants. Irish troops were sent to the area to secure it and encourage local people to return. A search of the area identified a damaged bridge, which a patrol was sent to, with a mission to effect repairs if possible.

== Ambush ==
On 8 November 1960, an eleven-man section from the Irish Army's 33rd Battalion arrived at the bridge over the Luweyeye River. They were forced to leave their vehicles when they encountered a blockade on the road. While clearing it, they encountered about 100 Luba militiamen armed with bows, poison-tipped arrows, spears and clubs, as well as some guns. While the Irish troops had arrived to protect the Baluba, the militia undoubtedly took them for Katangese mercenaries. Lieutenant Kevin Gleeson, advancing unarmed with his platoon sergeant, Hugh Gaynor, attempted to greet them peacefully, but was hit with a barrage of poison-tipped arrows.

The section leader, Lt. Kevin Gleeson, and Sergeant Gaynor were overtaken and beaten and hacked to death. The surprised Irish soldiers, who had not been deployed in a defensive formation after dismounting from their vehicles, retreated behind trees on either side of the road and opened fire on the tribesmen with their Carl Gustaf submachine guns, Lee–Enfield rifles and Bren light machine guns. The Baluba however advanced on them, and the Irish were cut off from their vehicles. Despite taking heavy losses, the Baluba overran the Irish soldiers with 'sheer weight of numbers' after which most of the Irish casualties were inflicted.

Three Irish soldiers managed to escape the initial fighting. One of them, Anthony Browne, reached a nearby village and gave all the money he had to the village women, hoping they would get him help, but was instead mobbed and beaten to death by the village men. His body was recovered two years later. The two surviving soldiers managed to hide and were found by other UN troops the following day.

A total of nine Irish soldiers were killed: Lieutenant Kevin Gleeson of Carlow, Sergeant. Hugh Gaynor of Blanchardstown, Corporal Peter Kelly of Templeogue, Corporal Liam Dougan of Cabra, Private Matthew Farrell of Jamestown, Dublin, Trooper Thomas Fennell of Donnycarney, Trooper Anthony Browne of Rialto, Private Michael McGuinn of Carlow, and Private Gerard Killeen of Rathmines. Some 25 Baluba were also killed.

== Aftermath ==
The bodies of the Irish dead were flown to Casement Aerodrome in Baldonnel, where they lay in state. Gleeson's coffin was placed on a gun carriage, while those of the rest were placed on army trucks. Some of those trucks were preserved, one in the National Transport Museum. Following a funeral procession through Dublin, they were buried at Glasnevin Cemetery. For his conduct during the ambush, 19-year-old Trooper Browne was posthumously awarded the Military Medal for Gallantry (the MMG), the Republic of Ireland's highest military award. He was the first recipient of the award. The citation read: "He endeavoured to create an opportunity to allow an injured comrade to escape by firing his Gustaf thereby drawing attention to his own position which he must have been aware would endanger his life. He had a reasonable opportunity to escape because he was not wounded but chose to remain with an injured comrade." At the time it was assumed that Browne had been killed at the scene. It was only later discovered that he had survived for two days before being killed in a separate attack.

A stone commemorating Lt. Gleeson can be found in his hometown of Carlow while a plaque commemorating Sgt. Hugh Gaynor can be found in his hometown of Blanchardstown.

Thomas Kenny, one of the survivors, believes that the real circumstances of Anthony Browne's death were misrepresented by the army, because they wished to have a hero to offer to the public. The wording of the citation implied that Browne had died trying to protect the wounded Kenny, by moving into the open and drawing fire on himself, letting an opportunity to escape pass. In fact he did escape into the forest.

== Effects in Ireland ==
Journalists Edward Doyle and Raymond Smith attributed the deaths of the Irish peacekeepers to their lack of adequate equipment and combat experience. As a result of the ambush, new Irish soldiers detailed for duty in the Congo were specifically trained on how to confront roadblocks.

Fionn Rogan argues that the massacre had a corrosive effect in the Republic of Ireland, where there had been strong support for the Congo expedition:

The effect of the Niemba ambush on Irish society's perception of the army was massive. The attack punctured the swelling pride that was emboldening the nation. The professionalism of our soldiers was called into question, which wasn't received well in Ireland. It presented a stumbling block to the development of the Irish military and Ireland's position as an international force. However Ireland managed to regain its composure. Ireland's position in future UN peacekeeping operations was preserved due to an impressive handling of the siege at Jadotville the following September.

The Baluba has long been associated with acts of cannibalism. Lurid stories circulated in the Irish popular press that the bodies of the victims had been mutilated and that their hearts had been removed to be eaten by the Baluba.

The notoriety of the attack, and the allegations of mutilation and cannibalism that circulated in the Irish popular press in its aftermath, led to the word "baluba" becoming a synonym for any "untrustworthy and barbaric" person in certain parts of Ireland.

== Bibliography ==
- Boehme, Olivier (2005). "The Involvement of the Belgian Central Bank in the Katanga Secession, 1960–1963". African Economic History. 33 (33): 1–29. JSTOR 4617603.
- Ishizuka, Katsumi (2014). Ireland and International Peacekeeping Operations 1960–2000. Routledge. ISBN 9781135295264.
- Riegel, Ralph; O'Mahony, John (2010). Missing in Action: The 50 Year Search for Ireland's Missing Soldier. Mercier Press. ISBN 9781856356947.
