= Michael Joe Costello =

Michael Joseph Costello (4 July 1904 – 20 October 1986) was an Irish rebel and military leader during the Irish War of Independence.

== Biography ==
Michael Joseph Costello was born on 4 July 1904 in Cloughjordan, County Tipperary, son of Denis Costello, headteacher in Cloughjordan National School, a native of Kilmihil, County Clare, and Teresa Moynihan, of County Offaly. He was the eldest of nine children, three of whom died during an epidemic of whooping cough.

His godfather was Thomas MacDonagh, who signed the Proclamation of the Irish Republic in 1916 and was one of the seven leaders of the Easter Rising. Costello became involved in the Irish War of Independence of 1919–1921, after seeing his father, a school teacher, arrested by the Black and Tans. He served with the Old IRA as an intelligence officer with the No. 1 Tipperary Brigade.

Costello joined the Irish National Army in 1922 and fought in the Irish Civil War of 1922–1923. Not long before he died in action, General Michael Collins promoted him to Colonel-Commandant when Costello was still only eighteen years old. He served as National Army Director of Intelligence from 1924 to 1926. He attended the US Army's Command and Staff College at Fort Leavenworth from 1926 to 1927. He advised the Free State on establishing an Irish Military College, of which he would later be appointed director of training in 1931 and commandant two years later, in 1933.

During The Emergency, he commanded the Irish Army's 1st Division, which was primarily responsible for the defence of the south coast of Ireland, as O/C Southern Command from 1940. The division, a volunteer force, had able personnel, but was poorly equipped. In Costello's words,

Given the inadequate armament and signal equipment of the Forces, training concentrated on attaining superiority over a potential invader in night operations with small forces expected to yield capture of enemy arms and ammunition, in cross country mobility and in marksmanship and the use of mines and explosives generally. The platoons made silent advances during dark nights over difficult and unknown country.

In 1944, one of Costello's units carried out a 44-mile (71 km) march carrying 40-pound (18 kg) packs in 11 hours. Costello was instrumental in founding An Cosantóir in 1941. He was promoted to major general in 1941 and to lieutenant general in 1945. He retired from the Army in 1946, after which he became the managing director of the Irish Sugar Company. At Irish Sugar, he bought the first electronic computer in Ireland from Dora Metcalf in 1957.

He died on 20 October 1986, aged 82.

== Bibliography ==
=== Writings ===
- Costello, Colonel M.J, "Guerilla Warfare" in (ed.) O'Reilly, Our Struggle For Independence (Cork 2009), pp. 187–98
- Costello, Col. M.J, "A New Type of Warfare? German Strategy and Tactics, Parts I and II" in O'Reilly pp. 199–216
- Costello, Col M.J, "Irish Soldiers Abroad: The Story of Ireland's Exile Soldiers", in O'Reilly, pp. 217–22
- Costello, Col M.J, "The Principles of War", 4 parts in O'Reilly, pp. 223–44

=== Secondary sources ===
- Duggan, John.P A History of the Irish Army (Dublin 1991)
- Harkness, David, The Restless Dominion: The Irish Free State and the British Commonwealth 1921-31 (London 1969)
- O'Halpin, Eunan, Defending Ireland: The Irish State and its Enemies since 1922 (Oxford 1999)
