= Robert Briscoe (politician) =

Irish politician (1894–1969)

Teachta Dála
- In office February 1948 – October 1961
- Constituency: Dublin South-West
- In office September 1927 – February 1948
- Constituency: Dublin South

Lord Mayor of Dublin
- In office 1961–1962
- Preceded by: Maurice E. Dockrell
- Succeeded by: James O'Keeffe
- In office 1956–1957
- Preceded by: Denis Larkin
- Succeeded by: James Carroll

Personal details
- Born: 25 September 1894 Dublin, Ireland
- Died: 29 May 1969 (aged 74) Dublin, Ireland
- Party: Fianna Fáil; Sinn Féin
- Spouse: Lillian Isaacs
- Children: 7, including Ben Briscoe

Robert Emmet Briscoe (25 September 1894 – 29 May 1969) was an Orthodox Jewish veteran of the IRA during the Irish War of Independence and a Fianna Fáil politician of Lithuanian descent. He served as a Teachta Dála (TD) in the Oireachtas (Irish parliament) from 1927 to 1965. Briscoe also served as Lord Mayor of Dublin from 1956 to 1957, and again from 1961 to 1962.

== Early life ==
Robert Emmet Briscoe was born into an Orthodox Jewish family in the Ranelagh neighbourhood of South Dublin. He was named after the Irish Revolutionary, Robert Emmet. His brother Wolfe Tone Briscoe was named after Theobald Wolfe Tone, one of the leaders of the Irish Rebellion of 1798.

Briscoe's father, Abraham William Briscoe, was the Lithuanian Jewish proprietor of Lawlor Briscoe, a furniture factory on Ormond Quay which made, refurbished, imported, exported and sold furniture all over Ireland and abroad, including to Imperial Germany, the Austro-Hungarian Empire, and to the United States. Abraham Briscoe – known universally as Pappa – had arrived in Ireland as a 14-year old immigrant from the shtetl of Zagar, Kovno Governorate, and made a living first as a brush salesman and then as a merchant of imported tea. The original family name in Lithuania is believed to have been Cherrick or Chasen.

After meeting her while travelling on business, Abraham Briscoe had married Ida Yoedicke, the fourth daughter of a successful Lithuanian Jewish family in Frankfurt am Main. The Yoeddicke family had similarly emigrated from the Russian Empire to escape from the pogroms, religious persecution, and anti-Semitic religious discrimination drastically limiting Jews from access to education and to life outside the Pale of Settlement, to live in the far more socially accepting climate of Imperial Germany.

In direct contradiction to "standard anti-Semitic stereotypes of the Jews as avaricious, cheap, clannish, unethical and unpatriotic", Abraham Briscoe felt a very deep sense of gratitude for the better life and freedom from religious persecution that emigrating from Tsarist Lithuania to Ireland had granted him and his family. His son later wrote, "To Father the soft green hills of Dublin Harbour were the sheltering arms of justice and Ireland seemed the very land of liberty - though he soon learned to think differently."

Abraham Briscoe accordingly raised his children upon stories from Irish mythology, "about the mysterious druids, and the prehistoric Fir Bolgs, and of the great days of the Irish Kings... of St Patrick, and the time that followed when Ireland was the only center of learning and culture in these northern lands and the spear point of the Christian faith." Abraham Briscoe also raised his children to be, like himself, enthusiastic Parnellite Irish nationalists and supporters of the Home Rule agenda of the Irish Parliamentary Party. Abraham also believed that the adultery scandal that destroyed Charles Stewart Parnell's political career, "was a Tory British plot", that Parnell had faked his own death, and that he would one day return to lead the Irish people nonviolently to freedom.

Meanwhile, according to Kevin Kearns' oral history of life in the tenements of Dublin, all money-lenders, regardless of religion or ethnicity, were referred to by Dubliners as "Jewmen". Jewish moneylenders, however, actually had a very good reputation among their customers, in direct contrast to their many Catholic competitors. According to Paddy Mooney, "See, you could come to an agreement with a Jew. Oh yes, our own money-lenders were worse in regards to exploiting the people." Some Jewish moneylenders were very well liked figures in the Dublin slums, known not only for their business integrity, but also for their regular and willing donations to local Catholic parishes and other charitable causes.

Even so, Abraham and Ida Briscoe intensely disliked fellow Irish Jews who lent out money. Pappa Briscoe often encouraged the children of their South Dublin synagogue to play pranks on known moneylenders during services for the Sabbath and the High Holy Days. Furthermore, when his son Robert began courting a, "certain very beautiful Jewish girl", Abraham Briscoe told him, "I hear you are keeping company with Esther. You know her father is a moneylender, and I am sure you know how much I love you. Now I solemnly tell you this, rather than see you married to a moneylender's daughter, I would prefer to see your right arm cut off at your shoulder."

== Personal life ==
Robert and his wife Lily had seven children; only two of their sons, Ben and Joe, remained in Dublin. One of Robert Briscoe's daughters Miriam converted to the Catholic faith and became a Carmelite nun. Ben followed his father into politics, while Joe joined the Irish Army aged 15 (claiming to be 18) in 1945; he retired in 1993 with the rank of commandant.

Eamon Martin, former Chief of Staff of Fianna Éireann, was best man at Robert Briscoe's Jewish wedding. They had been close friends during the Irish War of Independence.

== War of Independence ==
During the outbreak of World War I, Robert Briscoe was living in Berlin, but fled, using an American passport issued by U.S. Ambassador James W. Gerard, to join his parents at Karlsbad, in the Austro-Hungarian Empire. After being briefly interned as an enemy alien at Eger, Briscoe was released due to intervention of the Papal Nuncio in Vienna. He was also allowed to return to Dublin after swearing an oath that he would not take up arms against the Central Powers. Briscoe, who had already been leaning towards Irish republicanism, later recalled, "This I gladly did, since I had no desire to take part in England's wars."

In what caused years of sharp political arguments with his father, Robert Briscoe rejected his Home Rule nationalist upbringing and instead embraced Irish republicanism. He was active with the Purchases Department, General Headquarters (GHQ) of the Irish Republican Army (IRA) and Sinn Féin during the Irish War of Independence. He once upset his father by leaving the family's pre-fast meal when the IRA summoned him to an emergency meeting on the eve of Yom Kippur.

During the winter of 1919–1920, Briscoe was promoted to the personal staff of Michael Collins. Collins affectionately referred to Briscoe as, "my Jewman", and once posed as an Orthodox Jew with Briscoe's help, while in hiding from the police in Dublin's Little Jerusalem.

Briscoe also accompanied Éamon de Valera to the United States of America. He regularly spoke for the Sinn Féin cause at public meetings there and was adamant that being a "Hebrew" did not alter his Irishness or lessen his patriotism. At the same time, Briscoe later recalled in his memoirs that he sometimes felt afraid of having possibly broken the Second Commandment by loving Ireland more than the God of Israel.

Due to Briscoe's fluency in the German language from his family's pre-World War I business connections, Collins ultimately issued orders through Irish Jewish barrister Michael Noyk to send him to the Weimar Republic to be the chief agent for procuring arms for the IRA. While in Germany Briscoe purchased arms and had them shipped to Ireland in small parcels. Although the British authorities were constantly searching ships, smaller consignments of weapons were rarely discovered.

In December 1920, Charles McGuinness was made captain of a ship named Anita and sent to the Weimar Republic, where Briscoe had already purchased a large number of firearms. However, on the day the crew were due to depart for Ireland, McGuinness was observed by the port authorities paying the crew in large notes, which aroused their suspicions. The German police arrested McGuinness and the rest of the crew. McGuinness was brought to trial, but Briscoe paid for a good lawyer on McGuinness' behalf. Before a sympathetic German court, McGuinness' gun-running against the British Empire was deemed to be a minor offence and he was charged a token fine of 2,000 Deutschmarks. After passing sentence, the German judge wished McGuinness, "better luck next time". The incident caused an uproar back in the United Kingdom.

In 1921 Briscoe purchased a small tug boat named Frieda to be used in smuggling guns and ammunition to Ireland. On 28 October 1921 the Frieda slipped out to sea with Charles McGuinness at the helm and a German crew with a cargo of 300 guns, as well as 20,000 rounds of ammunition. Other sources cite this shipment as "the largest military shipment ever to reach the I.R.A." consisting of 1500 Gewehr 98 rifles, 2000 Mauser C96 pistols, and 1.7 million rounds of ammunition. On 2 November 1921 the Frieda successfully landed its cargo near Waterford harbor.

Also, during his assignment in Berlin, Briscoe first came into conflict with and complained to his superior John Smith Chartres about fellow Sinn Féin envoy Charles Bewley. Bewley's tendency towards regularly spouting, "extremely derogatory remarks about Jews in general", even in public places, caused very serious problems for the legation, particularly after one such outburst in a Berlin cafe caused Bewley to be ejected by the outraged German Jewish proprietor. At the insistence of Briscoe and multiple gentile members of the Irish Legation, Chartres wrote to the Irish Foreign Office and requested that Bewley to be recalled to Dublin, which he described as, "in the interest of decorum, national dignity, and commercial prudence". Chartres further explained, "Moreover, an anti-Semitic outburst by an Irish official in a country where Jews are very numerous and very influential was an extraordinary indiscretion from the point of view of the Irish material interest." Bewley, however, had friends in high places and was not recalled until much later.

== Irish Civil War ==
Following the Anglo-Irish Treaty and during the lead-up to the Irish Civil War, Briscoe found himself being courted by both sides, but felt greater sympathies for the anti-Treaty IRA. He later recalled, however, that his recently widowed mother tried to advise him against getting involved. Frieda Briscoe said that she was trying to give her son the advice his father would have given and pointed out the difference between fighting in a war of independence from colonialism and fighting one's former comrades in a civil war over what kind of a government to build after decolonisation. Despite his mother's advice, when his anti-Treaty IRA friends effectively served him with an ultimatum, Briscoe joined them in armed struggle against the new Irish Free State.

In June 1922, Briscoe was involved in an incident with fellow anti-treaty IRA members who attacked pro-treaty politician Darrell Figgis at his home. They entered the house and assaulted Darrell Figgis, cutting off his well-prized beard in the process. This traumatised Figgis' wife Millie, who had been under the impression Briscoe and his fellow assistants had been coming to kill Darrell. In November 1924 Millie would commit suicide, expressing in a suicide note that she was suffering from depression as a result of the 1922 attack. Darrell Figgis himself committed suicide in 1926.

In his biography, he recalls an incident of being recognised by a pro-Treaty opponent during the Civil War. Briscoe merely turned and walked away, confident that his enemy would not shoot him in the back.

Briscoe addressed political meetings and did fundraising work in the US from December 1922 to 1924. Briscoe was later awarded a pension by the Irish government under the Military Service Pensions Act, 1934 for his service with the IRA between 1920 and 1923.

== Dáil Éireann ==
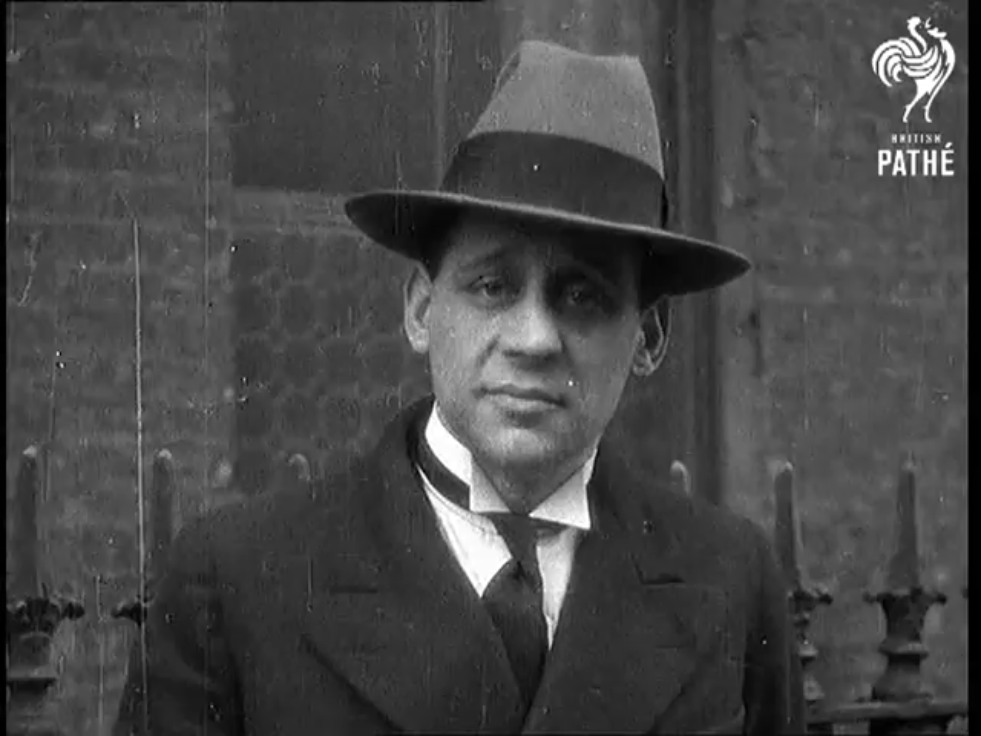
Robert Briscoe (1933)

Briscoe was a candidate at the June 1927 general election and the 1927 Dublin South by-election. He was elected at the September 1927 general election. Briscoe worked with Patrick Little to bring through a law limiting the interest that could be charged by moneylenders – and also, as he wrote, "made it illegal for a married woman to borrow money without the knowledge and consent of her husband, for these foolish ones are always the easiest prey of the moneylenders".

He served in Dáil Éireann for 38 years and was elected 12 times in the Dublin South and from 1948, Dublin South-West constituencies – from the 6th Dáil to the 17th Dáil.

== Zionism ==
During the Second World War, Briscoe, at this time a member of Dáil Éireann, was placed under close surveillance by the Irish Directorate of Military Intelligence and the Garda Siochana Special Branch. His covert activities in support of Zionism and his lobbying on behalf of refugees were also considered potentially damaging to the interests of the Irish State by senior civil service officials from the Department of Justice. Briscoe was also an admirer and friend of Ze'ev Jabotinsky and his campaign of resistance to antisemitism and his efforts to create a Jewish State. Between 1939 and 1940, Robert Briscoe worked closely with former British Army Colonel and Tsavo Valley lion hunter John Henry Patterson, the former officer commanding of both the Zion Mule Corps and the Jewish Legion during the First World War. Together, they were involved in covert fund raising for the Irgun in the United States. Jabotinsky, while head of Irgun, visited Dublin for secret instruction from Robert Briscoe in how the tactics of guerrilla warfare that had proven so successful during the Irish War of Independence could also be used against the continued rule of the British Empire over the Mandate of Palestine. During the same period, Briscoe jokingly described himself as the "Chair of Subversive Activity against England". Briscoe also campaigned for political asylum to be granted to Jewish refugees seeking to flee Nazi Germany, both before and during the Holocaust, but he did so discreetly in order not to be accused of compromising the neutrality policy of the Fianna Fáil government. Briscoe notably had ugly spats with Irish trade envoy to Nazi Germany and avowed anti-Semite Charles Bewley, who tried to thwart his effort to help German Jewish refugees gain visas for Ireland during the war.

After the Second World War, Briscoe acted as a special advisor to Menachem Begin in the transformation of Irgun from a paramilitary organisation into the Herut political party (later Likud) in the new State of Israel. Briscoe had already been a key figure in the formation of the Fianna Fáil political party out of the Anti-treaty IRA after Irish independence, but not before a bitter and fratricidal Civil War, which Briscoe had grown over the years and with the benefit of hindsight to deeply regret. Briscoe accordingly persuaded Menachem Begin, immediately after the Altalena Affair, to make the transition without further delay and to seek to enter the Knesset. By doing this, Briscoe may have prevented an Irish-style civil war from taking place in Israel.

== Later life ==
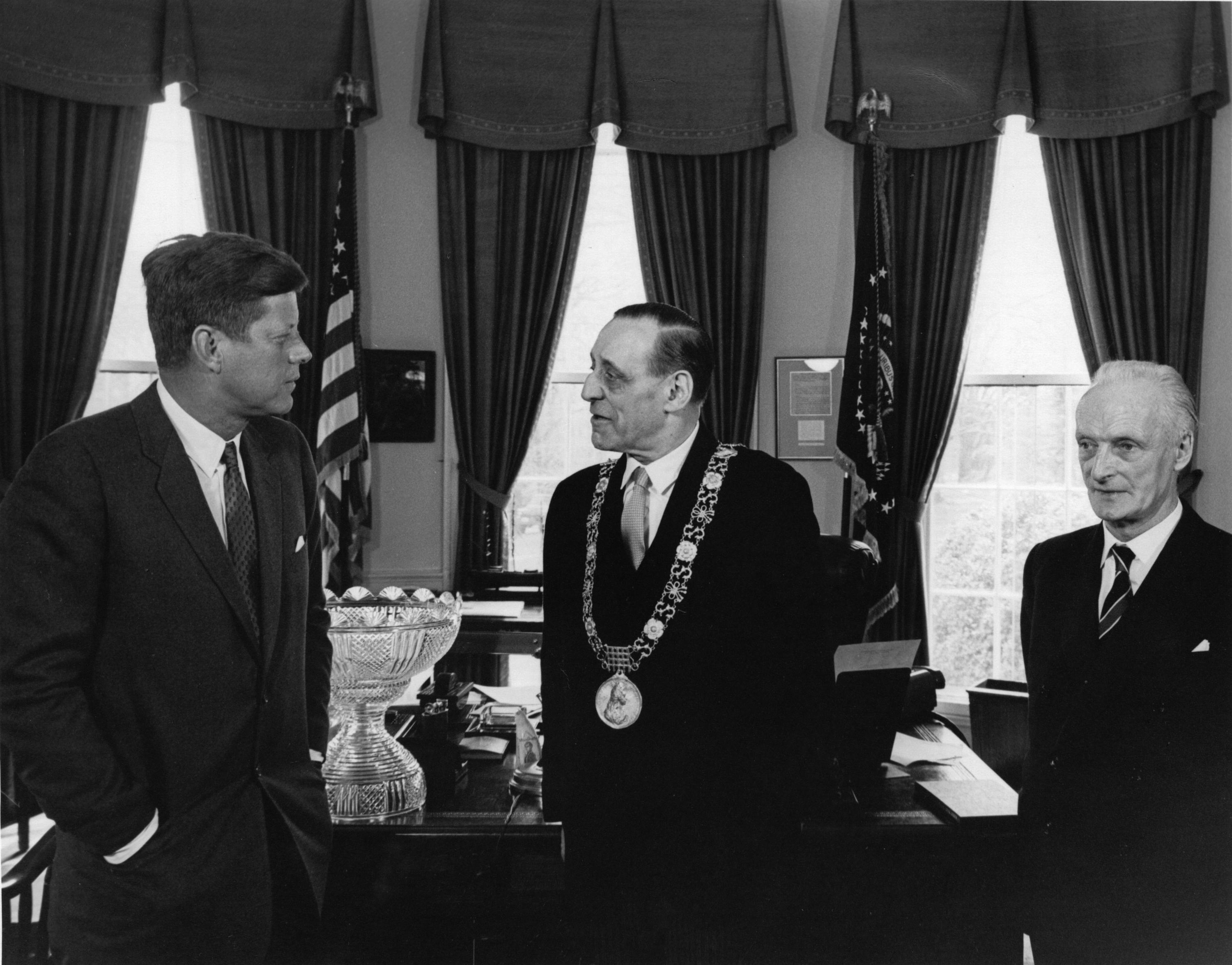
President John F. Kennedy meets in the Oval Office with Lord Mayor of Dublin Robert Briscoe (1962)

Briscoe retired from the Dáil at the 1965 election, and he was succeeded by his son, Ben who served for a further 37 years. In 1956, Briscoe became the first Jewish Lord Mayor of Dublin, although he was not the first Jewish Mayor in Ireland. That title belongs to William Annyas, who was elected Mayor of Youghal, County Cork in 1555. Briscoe was Dublin's first Jewish Lord Mayor, although Lewis Wormser Harris was elected Lord Mayor in 1876, but died before assuming office. Briscoe served a one-year term and was re-elected in 1961. In this capacity, he often travelled abroad to negotiate trade deals in behalf of the Irish Republic and was famously photographed lighting a menorah in New York City. After being told that the Lord Mayor of Dublin was Jewish, Yogi Berra allegedly joked, "Only in America!"

== Death and legacy ==
Briscoe's memoir, For the Life of Me, was published in 1958. He died on 29 May 1969 and, following an Orthodox Jewish funeral, he was buried at Dolphins Barn Jewish Cemetery in Dublin.

In later years, his son Ben Briscoe opposed the messianic cult of personality surrounding Taoiseach Charles Haughey during the 1980s, which Ben Briscoe compared to a "Fascist Dictatorship" forcibly imposed upon Fianna Fáil. Briscoe accordingly helped lead the discontented anti-Haughey faction within Fianna Fáil, which included Charlie McCreevy. Like his father before him, Ben Briscoe, too, served as Lord Mayor of Dublin from 1988 to 1989 and described winning the election as one of the proudest moments of his entire life.

The Emerald Isle Immigration Center in New York City has devoted a special prize called the Robert Briscoe Award. The group celebrates the historically very close relationship between Jewish and Irish communities in New York City and honours Jewish New Yorkers who have helped support immigration in the United States. The 2016 Award Winners were Queens Borough President Melinda Katz and Deborah King, director of SEIU 1199's training and employment funds. Previous winners have included former New York Mayor Ed Koch, disgraced former Gov. Eliot Spitzer, and U.S. Senator Charles Schumer.

== In popular culture ==
- Robert Briscoe's role in the Irish War of Independence was dramatised in The Fabulous Irishman, an episode of the American anthology drama television series Playhouse 90 broadcast on CBS in 1957. In that episode, Briscoe was played by Art Carney while David Opatoshu played Briscoe's father (and was credited as "Briscoe's Father" instead of "Abraham Briscoe" which was his actual father's name). The Fabulous Irishman, like most programs at the time, was shown live. Art Carney was praised for his performance as Robert Briscoe in a review was published in The New York Times. Another review that similarly praised Carney's acting and favourably compared the film to John Ford's The Informer was published by The Boston Globe.

== Publications ==
- — (1958). For the Life of Me. Little, Brown & Company.

Civic offices
Preceded by Denis Larkin	Lord Mayor of Dublin; 1956–1957	Succeeded by James Carroll
Preceded by Maurice E. Dockrell	Lord Mayor of Dublin; 1961–1962	Succeeded by James O'Keeffe

Dáil	Election	Deputy (Party)	Deputy (Party)	Deputy (Party)	Deputy (Party)	Deputy (Party)	Deputy (Party)	Deputy (Party)
2nd	1921	Thomas Kelly (SF)	Daniel McCarthy (SF)	Constance Markievicz (SF)	Cathal Ó Murchadha (SF)	4 seats 1921–1923		
3rd	1922	Thomas Kelly (PT-SF)	Daniel McCarthy (PT-SF)	William O'Brien (Lab)	Myles Keogh (Ind.)	4 seats 1921–1923		
4th	1923	Philip Cosgrave (CnaG)	Daniel McCarthy (CnaG)	Constance Markievicz (Rep)	Myles Keogh (Ind.)	Cathal Ó Murchadha (Rep)	Michael Hayes (CnaG)	Peadar Doyle (CnaG)
4th	1923 by-election	Philip Cosgrave (CnaG)	Daniel McCarthy (CnaG)	Constance Markievicz (Rep)	Myles Keogh (Ind.)	Cathal Ó Murchadha (Rep)	Hugh Kennedy (CnaG)	Peadar Doyle (CnaG)
4th	March 1924 by-election	James O'Mara (CnaG)	Daniel McCarthy (CnaG)	Constance Markievicz (Rep)	Myles Keogh (Ind.)	Cathal Ó Murchadha (Rep)	Hugh Kennedy (CnaG)	Peadar Doyle (CnaG)
4th	November 1924 by-election	James O'Mara (CnaG)	Daniel McCarthy (CnaG)	Constance Markievicz (Rep)	Myles Keogh (Ind.)	Cathal Ó Murchadha (Rep)	Seán Lemass (SF)	Peadar Doyle (CnaG)
4th	1925 by-election	James O'Mara (CnaG)	Thomas Hennessy (CnaG)	Constance Markievicz (Rep)	Myles Keogh (Ind.)	Cathal Ó Murchadha (Rep)	Seán Lemass (SF)	Peadar Doyle (CnaG)
5th	1927 (Jun)	James Beckett (CnaG)	Vincent Rice (NL)	Constance Markievicz (FF)	Myles Keogh (Ind.)	Thomas Lawlor (Lab)	Seán Lemass (FF)	Peadar Doyle (CnaG)
5th	1927 by-election	James Beckett (CnaG)	Vincent Rice (NL)	Thomas Hennessy (CnaG)	Myles Keogh (Ind.)	Thomas Lawlor (Lab)	Seán Lemass (FF)	Peadar Doyle (CnaG)
6th	1927 (Sep)	James Beckett (CnaG)	Robert Briscoe (FF)	Thomas Hennessy (CnaG)	Myles Keogh (CnaG)	Frank Kerlin (FF)	Seán Lemass (FF)	Peadar Doyle (CnaG)
7th	1932	James Beckett (CnaG)	Robert Briscoe (FF)	Thomas Hennessy (CnaG)	Myles Keogh (CnaG)	James Lynch (FF)	Seán Lemass (FF)	Peadar Doyle (CnaG)
8th	1933	James Beckett (CnaG)	Robert Briscoe (FF)	James McGuire (CnaG)	Thomas Kelly (FF)	James Lynch (FF)	Seán Lemass (FF)	Peadar Doyle (CnaG)
9th	1937	Myles Keogh (FG)	Robert Briscoe (FF)	Thomas Lawlor (Lab)	Thomas Kelly (FF)	Joseph Hannigan (Ind.)	Seán Lemass (FF)	Peadar Doyle (FG)
10th	1938	James Beckett (FG)	Robert Briscoe (FF)	James Lynch (FF)	Thomas Kelly (FF)	Joseph Hannigan (Ind.)	Seán Lemass (FF)	Peadar Doyle (FG)
10th	1939 by-election	John McCann (FF)	Robert Briscoe (FF)	James Lynch (FF)	Thomas Kelly (FF)	Joseph Hannigan (Ind.)	Seán Lemass (FF)	Peadar Doyle (FG)
11th	1943	Maurice Dockrell (FG)	Robert Briscoe (FF)	James Lynch (FF)	James Larkin Jnr (Lab)	John McCann (FF)	Seán Lemass (FF)	Peadar Doyle (FG)
12th	1944	Maurice Dockrell (FG)	Robert Briscoe (FF)	James Lynch (FF)	James Larkin Jnr (Lab)	John McCann (FF)	Seán Lemass (FF)	Peadar Doyle (FG)
13th	1948	Constituency abolished. See Dublin South-Central, Dublin South-East and Dublin South-West.						

Dáil	Election	Deputy (Party)	Deputy (Party)	Deputy (Party)	Deputy (Party)	Deputy (Party)
22nd	1981	Niall Andrews (FF)	Séamus Brennan (FF)	Nuala Fennell (FG)	John Kelly (FG)	Alan Shatter (FG)
23rd	1982 (Feb)	Niall Andrews (FF)	Séamus Brennan (FF)	Nuala Fennell (FG)	John Kelly (FG)	Alan Shatter (FG)
24th	1982 (Nov)	Niall Andrews (FF)	Séamus Brennan (FF)	Nuala Fennell (FG)	John Kelly (FG)	Alan Shatter (FG)
25th	1987	Tom Kitt (FF)	Séamus Brennan (FF)	Anne Colley (PDs)	John Kelly (FG)	Alan Shatter (FG)
26th	1989	Tom Kitt (FF)	Séamus Brennan (FF)	Nuala Fennell (FG)	Roger Garland (GP)	Alan Shatter (FG)
27th	1992	Tom Kitt (FF)	Séamus Brennan (FF)	Liz O'Donnell (PDs)	Eithne FitzGerald (Lab)	Alan Shatter (FG)
28th	1997	Tom Kitt (FF)	Séamus Brennan (FF)	Liz O'Donnell (PDs)	Olivia Mitchell (FG)	Alan Shatter (FG)
29th	2002	Tom Kitt (FF)	Séamus Brennan (FF)	Liz O'Donnell (PDs)	Olivia Mitchell (FG)	Eamon Ryan (GP)
30th	2007	Tom Kitt (FF)	Séamus Brennan (FF)	Alan Shatter (FG)	Olivia Mitchell (FG)	Eamon Ryan (GP)
30th	2009 by-election	Tom Kitt (FF)	George Lee (FG)	Alan Shatter (FG)	Olivia Mitchell (FG)	Eamon Ryan (GP)
31st	2011	Shane Ross (Ind.)	Peter Mathews (FG)	Alan Shatter (FG)	Olivia Mitchell (FG)	Alex White (Lab)
32nd	2016	Constituency abolished. See Dublin Rathdown, Dublin South-West and Dún Laoghaire.				

Dáil	Election	Deputy (Party)	Deputy (Party)	Deputy (Party)	Deputy (Party)	Deputy (Party)
13th	1948	Seán MacBride (CnaP)	Peadar Doyle (FG)	Bernard Butler (FF)	Michael O'Higgins (FG)	Robert Briscoe (FF)
14th	1951	Seán MacBride (CnaP)	Peadar Doyle (FG)	Bernard Butler (FF)	Michael ffrench-O'Carroll (Ind.)	Robert Briscoe (FF)
15th	1954	Seán MacBride (CnaP)	Peadar Doyle (FG)	Bernard Butler (FF)	Michael O'Higgins (FG)	Robert Briscoe (FF)
15th	1956 by-election	Seán MacBride (CnaP)	Noel Lemass (FF)	Bernard Butler (FF)	Michael O'Higgins (FG)	Robert Briscoe (FF)
16th	1957	James Carroll (Ind.)	Noel Lemass (FF)	Bernard Butler (FF)	Michael O'Higgins (FG)	Robert Briscoe (FF)
16th	1959 by-election	James Carroll (Ind.)	Noel Lemass (FF)	Richie Ryan (FG)	Michael O'Higgins (FG)	Robert Briscoe (FF)
17th	1961	James Carroll (Ind.)	Noel Lemass (FF)	Richie Ryan (FG)	James O'Keeffe (FG)	Robert Briscoe (FF)
18th	1965	John O'Connell (Lab)	Noel Lemass (FF)	Richie Ryan (FG)	Joseph Dowling (FF)	Ben Briscoe (FF)
19th	1969	John O'Connell (Lab)	Noel Lemass (FF)	Seán Dunne (Lab)	Joseph Dowling (FF)	4 seats 1969–1977
19th	1970 by-election	John O'Connell (Lab)	Noel Lemass (FF)	Seán Sherwin (FF)	Joseph Dowling (FF)	4 seats 1969–1977
20th	1973	John O'Connell (Lab)	Noel Lemass (FF)	Declan Costello (FG)	Joseph Dowling (FF)	4 seats 1969–1977
20th	1976 by-election	John O'Connell (Lab)	Brendan Halligan (Lab)	Declan Costello (FG)	Joseph Dowling (FF)	4 seats 1969–1977
21st	1977	Constituency abolished. See Dublin Ballyfermot				

Dáil	Election	Deputy (Party)	Deputy (Party)	Deputy (Party)	Deputy (Party)	Deputy (Party)
22nd	1981	Seán Walsh (FF)	Larry McMahon (FG)	Mary Harney (FF)	Mervyn Taylor (Lab)	4 seats 1981–1992
23rd	1982 (Feb)	Seán Walsh (FF)	Larry McMahon (FG)	Mary Harney (FF)	Mervyn Taylor (Lab)	4 seats 1981–1992
24th	1982 (Nov)	Seán Walsh (FF)	Michael O'Leary (FG)	Mary Harney (FF)	Mervyn Taylor (Lab)	4 seats 1981–1992
25th	1987	Seán Walsh (FF)	Chris Flood (FF)	Mary Harney (PDs)	Mervyn Taylor (Lab)	4 seats 1981–1992
26th	1989	Pat Rabbitte (WP)	Chris Flood (FF)	Mary Harney (PDs)	Mervyn Taylor (Lab)	4 seats 1981–1992
27th	1992	Pat Rabbitte (DL)	Chris Flood (FF)	Mary Harney (PDs)	Mervyn Taylor (Lab)	Éamonn Walsh (Lab)
28th	1997	Pat Rabbitte (DL)	Chris Flood (FF)	Mary Harney (PDs)	Conor Lenihan (FF)	Brian Hayes (FG)
29th	2002	Pat Rabbitte (Lab)	Charlie O'Connor (FF)	Seán Crowe (SF)	Conor Lenihan (FF)	4 seats 2002–2016
30th	2007	Pat Rabbitte (Lab)	Charlie O'Connor (FF)	Brian Hayes (FG)	Conor Lenihan (FF)	4 seats 2002–2016
31st	2011	Pat Rabbitte (Lab)	Eamonn Maloney (Lab)	Brian Hayes (FG)	Seán Crowe (SF)	4 seats 2002–2016
31st	2014 by-election	Pat Rabbitte (Lab)	Eamonn Maloney (Lab)	Paul Murphy (AAA)	Seán Crowe (SF)	4 seats 2002–2016
32nd	2016	Colm Brophy (FG)	John Lahart (FF)	Paul Murphy (AAA–PBP)	Seán Crowe (SF)	Katherine Zappone (Ind.)
33rd	2020	Colm Brophy (FG)	John Lahart (FF)	Paul Murphy (S–PBP)	Seán Crowe (SF)	Francis Noel Duffy (GP)
34th	2024	Colm Brophy (FG)	John Lahart (FF)	Paul Murphy (PBP–S)	Seán Crowe (SF)	Ciarán Ahern (Lab)
