= L 5 =

LZ 28 (L 5)

General information
- Type: M-class reconnaissance-bomber rigid airship
- National origin: German Empire
- Manufacturer: Luftschiffbau Zeppelin
- Designer: Ludwig Dürr
- Primary user: Imperial German Navy

History
- First flight: 22 September 1914
- Retired: 7 August 1915 (dismantled after being damaged by Russian anti-aircraft fire)

L 5 (factory number LZ 28) was a M-class Zeppelin built by Luftschiffbau Zeppelin in Friedrichshafen for the Imperial German Navy. It was the 28th airship built by Count Ferdinand von Zeppelin and the fifth airship operated by the Imperial German Navy.

== History ==
LZ 28 made its first flight on 22 September 1914. It was taken over by the Navy and designated as L 5. Initially, L 5 was used for reconnaissance missions over the North Sea. As early as 19 October 1914, the airship was near the English coast, approximately 60 kilometers off Yarmouth. During the British naval raid off the German North Sea coast on 25 December 1914 (Christmas Raid), L 5 bombed the British submarine E11. The submarine escaped by executing an emergency dive.

During the Battle of Dogger Bank on 24 January 1915, between British and German naval forces, L 5 patrolled above the battle area. It was fired upon by British warships but transmitted reconnaissance data via radio to the German naval command.

L 5 was particularly effective in detecting enemy minefields. If a naval airship detected a single naval mine, it was destroyed with machine gun fire. If a minefield was discovered, the airship dropped small buoys with colored flags around the perimeter and radioed the coordinates to the appropriate minesweeper flotilla. Occasionally, the Zeppelin would land next to a minesweeper and take an officer aboard so that the minesweeping officer could inspect the minefield from the air.

In June 1915, L 5 was transferred to the Baltic Sea and stationed at the Seddin Airship Station beginning on 15 June 1915. From there, L 5 conducted reconnaissance missions and bombing raids against Russian targets.

=== Fate ===
On 7 August 1915, the airship was severely damaged by Russian anti-aircraft fire during a mission and had to be dismantled.

== Technical Specifications ==
- Gas volume: 22,500 m³ of hydrogen
- Length: 158.0 m
- Diameter: 14.90 m
- Payload: 9.2 t
- Propulsion: Three Maybach engines, each producing 210 kW
- Speed: 22.5 m/s (81 km/h)

== See also ==
- List of Zeppelins
