= Charles Bewley =

Irish diplomat (1888–1969)

Charles Henry Bewley, GCSG (12 July 1888 – 1969) was an Irish diplomat.

Charles Bewley

Raised in a prominent Dublin Quaker business family, he embraced Irish Republicanism and Roman Catholicism. He was the Irish envoy to Berlin who reportedly thwarted efforts to obtain visas for Jews wanting to leave Nazi Germany in the 1930s and to move to the safety of the Irish Free State.

== Family and early life ==
Bewley was born in Dublin, Ireland, into a wealthy privileged family, the eldest of four brothers. His mother was Elizabeth Eveleen Pim, whose family owned a large department store in George's Street, Dublin. His father was physician Dr. Henry Theodore Bewley (1860-1945), related to the family that operated the successful "Bewley's cafés" chain of coffee houses in Dublin that is still famous today. His parents were both Quakers, and Charles and his brothers were raised in that tradition.

He was educated at Park House, a boarding school in England. In 1901, he won a scholarship to Winchester College, where he became the Library Prefect. That honour was withdrawn when he declared in a debate that "England is not a musical nation" and ridiculed the anthem "God save the King". He proceeded to New College, Oxford, where he read Law. In 1910, he won the Newdigate Prize for poetry. He completed his training as a barrister at King's Inns, Dublin, and in 1914 he was called to the bar.

Charles' brother Kenneth also attended Oxford University. Kenneth was a career civil servant in H.M. Treasury. His younger brothers, Geoffrey and Maurice, studied medicine at Trinity College Dublin.

Charles Bewley was seen as an "enfant terrible". He rejected his Anglo-Irish heritage and embraced Celtic mythology of the kind popularised by W. B. Yeats. He spoke against the "evils of Anglicization", supported the Boers in South Africa, and converted to Roman Catholicism. He rejected Unionist politics and supported the Home Rule movement.

== Career ==
At the outbreak of World War I in 1914, he was in Ireland, acting as a defending barrister for many nationalists and republicans. He wrote Seán Mac Eoin's death-sentence speech. In the 1918 general election, he stood, unsuccessfully, as a Sinn Féin candidate. During the Irish Civil War, he took the pro-Treaty side. As a barrister, he prosecuted many anti-Treaty prisoners. At the 1923 general election, he was a Cumann na nGaedheal candidate in the Mayo South constituency, but he was not elected.

Between the truce in the Irish War of Independence and the Anglo-Irish Treaty being signed, he was Irish consul in Berlin with responsibility for trade. He was appointed Irish ambassador to the Vatican (resident minister to the Holy See) in 1929. At that time, Irish diplomatic appointments were meant to be made by the British monarch, but Bewley frequently flouted the diplomatic niceties by ignoring the implications of that. If anything, the complaints of H.J. Chilton, the British representative, and of Sir Robert Clive, his successor, improved Bewley's reputation in Ireland.

In July 1933, the British Foreign Office became annoyed when the Pope, Pius XI, knighted Bewley into the Order of the Grand Cross of St Gregory the Great, because the King's agreement had not been sought. Bewley was told, with no effect, that, as a King's representative, he was not entitled to wear the decoration without royal permission.

However, the constant bickering between the Irish and British representatives to the Vatican pleased neither Dublin nor London. It paved the way for Bewley to obtain the appointment he really wanted, and he went to Berlin in July 1933. The President of Germany, Hindenburg, praised his impeccable German.

Bewley's reports from Berlin enthusiastically praised National Socialism and Chancellor Hitler. He gave interviews to German papers which were anti-British, and annoyed the British embassy in Berlin, ignoring the Silver Jubilee of George V in 1935. With the ending of the Anglo-Irish Trade War and the return of the treaty ports, good relations were established between Ireland and Britain. Bewley was frequently reprimanded by Dublin, which was no longer tolerant of his anti-British jibes.

== Antisemitism ==
The first indication that Bewley was antisemitic came in Berlin in 1921, where Bewley was the Irish consul for trade. The new Irish state was not yet formally recognised, and the Irish leader, Michael Collins, asked Robert Briscoe, an IRA quartermaster, to buy guns. In time, Briscoe would play an important political role and would be the first Jewish Lord Mayor of Dublin. Bewley and Briscoe went to a Jewish-owned music hall in the Tauenzien Palast, but, after Briscoe left, it was reported that Bewley insulted Judaism and was thrown out, resulting in a drunken brawl. John Chartres, the head of the Irish Bureau, was going to take action, but the Irish Civil War broke out. Briscoe took the losing anti-Treaty side, while Bewley returned to Dublin, took the pro-Treaty side, and prosecuted anti-Treaty prisoners in the courts.

In March 1922, George Gavan Duffy wrote to Ernest Blythe opposing Bewley's appointment as an Irish envoy to Germany: "there is a great objection to appointing him to such a post in Germany, because his semitic [sic] convictions are so pronounced that it would be very difficult for him to deal properly with all the persons and questions within the scope of an Envoy to Berlin, where the Jewish element is very strong." Gavan Duffy suggested instead that Munich or Vienna might be more suitable, "as the same considerations would not arise in those places".

It is believed Bewley's hatred of Jews was partly influenced by the controversial teachings of Irish Catholic priest Denis Fahey. While he was serving as an envoy to Berlin, Bewley once referred to Fahey's pamphlet The Rulers of Russia when being interviewed by the permanent secretary of the Irish Ministry for External Affairs Joseph Walshe.

== Envoy to Berlin ==
Bewley was the "Irish Minister Plenipotentiary and Envoy Extraordinary" in Berlin in the crucial years from 1933 to 1939. Reading his reports to Dublin during the 1930s gives the impression that German Jews were not threatened, and that they were involved in pornography, abortion and "the international white slave traffic". That from a man responsible for processing visa applications from Jews wishing to leave Germany for Ireland. His explanation of the Nuremberg Laws was: "As the Chancellor pointed out, it amounts to the making of the Jews into a national minority; and as they themselves claim to be a separate race, they should have nothing to complain of." He reported that he had no knowledge of any "deliberate cruelty on the part of the [German] Government ... towards the Jews", and criticised Irish refugee policy as "inordinately liberal, and facilitating the entry of the wrong class of people" (meaning Jews). The Irish legation in Berlin consisted of two people, Bewley and a German secretary called Frau Kamberg. She appeared more sympathetic to the Jews than Bewley. Fewer than a hundred Jews obtained Irish visas between 1933 and 1939. Bewley was dismissed from his position in 1939.

== Later years ==
Bewley was dismissed just as World War II was breaking out, and never received a pension. However, Joseph Goebbels gave him a job writing propaganda. For a time, Bewley worked for a Swedish news agency, which was part of Goebbels' propaganda machine.

At the end of the War he was held by British troops, having been picked up in Merano, Northern Italy, in May 1945 and held in Terni. He was carrying Irish diplomatic papers identifying him as the Irish minister to Berlin and to the Vatican. Joseph Walshe, Secretary of the Department of External Affairs, and Sir John Maffey, the British diplomatic representative in independent Ireland, decided on a solution that would undermine Bewley's ego.

At that time, passports required the identification of the holder's trade or profession. Bewley was issued with a new Irish passport which had for that entry, "a person of no importance". At the end of the war, passport checkpoints were frequent. Bewley never produced that passport. He was released in Rome, and apparently never left. He wrote some newspaper articles, and a biography of Hermann Göring in 1956.

In his final years, he and Monsignor Hugh O'Flaherty, "the Vatican Pimpernel", who had rescued thousands of Jews and escaped POWs from the Nazis, became great friends. Charles Henry Bewley died unmarried in Rome in 1969.
