= Eamon Martin (Irish republican) =

Eamon Martin (1892–1971) was an Irish Republican who fought in the Easter Rising and was chief of staff of Fianna Éireann. He was also a member of the Irish Republican Brotherhood. and a member of the Irish Volunteers executive council.

== Biography ==
Martin joined the Gaelic League at age fifteen. In 1909 his former schoolmaster informed him that an organisation (Na Fianna Éireann) was soon to be set up. He told Martin that Countess Markievicz had been to see him and that she had told him to recommend it to his pupils. He encouraged him to attend the first meeting. At the meeting he met Bulmer Hobson and Countess Markievicz for the first time. In August 1915 Martin became director of organisation and recruiting and commandant of the Fianna's Dublin Battalion and held these positions until Easter 1916. From January 1917 to 1920 he was chief of staff of the organisation. Martin was also a member of the Irish Volunteers Executive Council, representing Fianna Éireann.

In 1914 Martin was involved in the Kilcoole gun-running and Howth gun-running operations. On Easter Monday, the first day of the rising, he and a group of about 30 Fianna members attacked the Magazine Fort in Phoenix Park. The detachment disarmed the guards and took guns and ammunition. They intended to blow up the fort, which would signal the start of the rising, but the type of explosives inside the fort were not what they expected. The following day Martin was involved in the attempt to occupy Broadstone railway station. As the detachment approached the station Martin was shot and was taken to Richmond Hospital. It was discovered that a bullet had passed through his arm, into his chest and out through his lung and back.

After the rising Martin was commandant of a special Fianna Éireann commando, with the purpose of resisting army conscription during World War I.

== Legacy and death ==
Martin died in May 1971 and is buried in Deansgrange Cemetery. His funeral was attended by then Taoiseach, Jack Lynch and then president Éamon de Valera's aide-de-camp Col. Sean Brennan. Shots were fired at the graveside by an Irish Army detachment.

Martin's great grandson, Eamon Murphy is an amateur historian. He has a blog titled "The History of Na Fianna Eireann" and is currently writing a book on Eamon Martin's life.
