= Charles McGuinness =

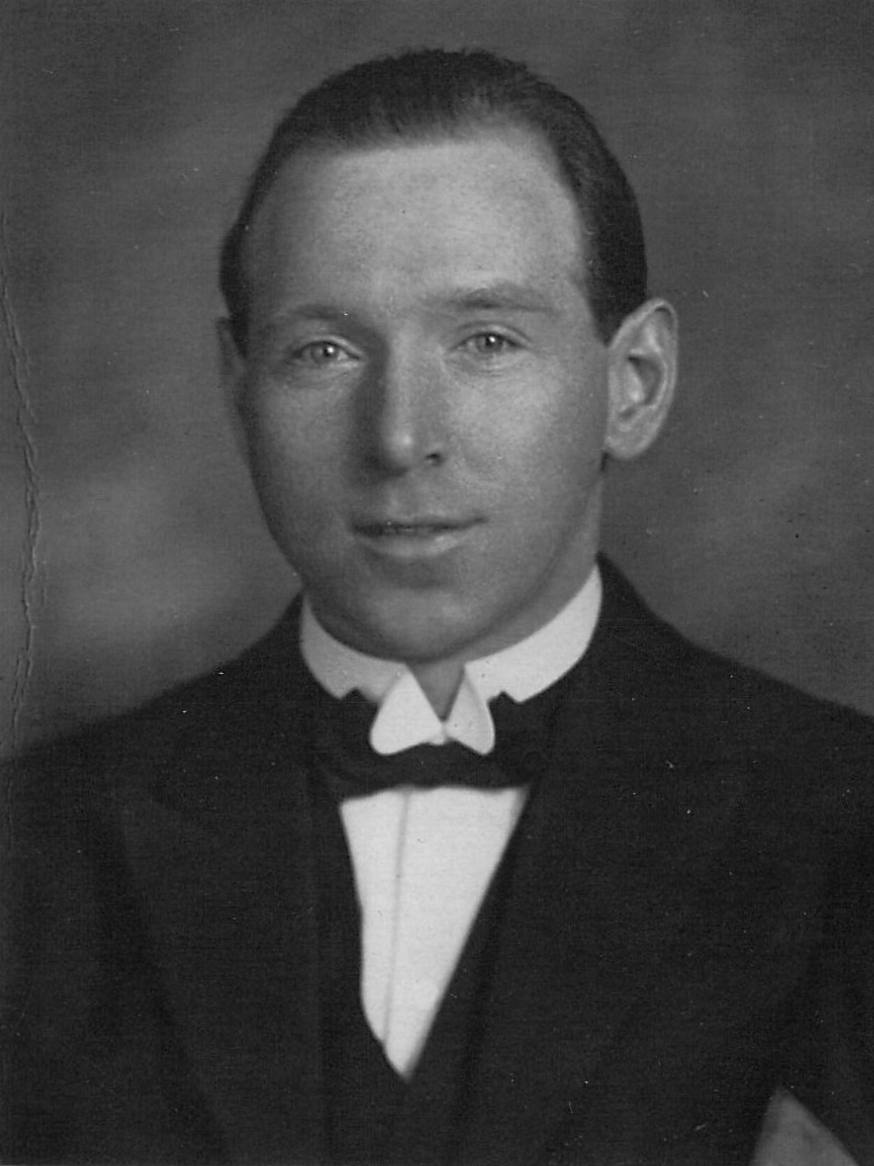
- McGuinness, c. 1922
- Born: 6 May 1893
- Died: 7 December 1947 (aged 54); Ballymoney Strand near Gorey, County Wexford, Ireland
- Other name: "Charles T. Hennessey"
- Military career
- Allegiance: United Kingdom; South Africa; Irish Republic; Second Spanish Republic; Irish Free State
- Branch: British Navy; South African Army; Irish Republican Army; Anti-Treaty IRA; International Brigades; Irish Naval Service
- Rank: Commanding officer of the 3rd Battalion of the Northern IRA (1921); Chief Petty Officer (Irish Naval Service)
- Nicknames: "Charlie", "Nomad", "Night-Hawk"
- Conflicts: World War I; East African campaign; War of Irish Independence; Irish Civil War; Spanish Civil War

Charles John 'Nomad' McGuinness (6 March 1893 – 7 December 1947) was an Irish adventurer supposed to have been involved with a myriad of acts of patriotism and nomadic impulses. Due to a habitual trait of embellishing his own life story mixed with his genuine wanderlust and actual achievements, discerning what is and is not accurate about McGuinness' life has been a challenge for historians. In a 1934 autobiography, McGuinness summarised himself as an "Irish Sailor, Soldier, Pearl-fisher, Pirate, Gun-runner, Rum-runner, Rebel and Antarctic Explorer". Writing for the Irish Independent, Irish historian Breandán Mac Suibhne remarked that "bush-fighter, big-game hunter, hobo, jail-breaker, radio broadcaster, set-maker in Hollywood, construction worker on Long Island, journalist, author of children's literature and internee" could also be reasonably added to that list.

Primarily a sailor over the course of his life, McGuinness served in several militaries over the course of his life. During the Irish revolutionary period, McGuinness aided the Irish Republican Army by running guns from Germany across the sea. Thereafter McGuinness variously spent time living and working in the United States and Soviet Russia, briefly involved himself in the Spanish Civil War, before return to Ireland for the World War II period. In 1942 he was found guilty while serving as part of the Irish Naval Service of attempting to collaborate with Germany. He is believed to have drowned at sea in 1947.

== Early life ==
Charles John "Nomad" McGuinness was born 6 March 1893. He was raised in Lower Road, Derry, Ireland. His mother, Margaret Hernan was of Irish descent from Donegal, and his father, John McGuinness, was a ship captain born in the United States. Margaret died when Charles was young. Charles had two brothers, Hugh and John McGuinness. Hugh was a headmaster of St. Eugene's in Rosemount, Derry, and John was a teacher as well.

In 1908, at the age of 15, McGuinness went to sea on the schooner Vixen, the start of a trip which would take him away from home for several years. His first world trip was in 1909 on the ship Cedarbark. It went from Wales to Iquique in Chile and then on to New York. In 1910, he arrived in Sydney on The Pilgrim. The Pilgrim ended up shipwrecked off of the coast of Tahiti in 1910 and McGuinness was left stranded on a lifeboat for two weeks until rescued. He subsequently remained in the Tahiti region for a year, working as a pearl fisher.

McGuinness would claim later in life that between c. 1913 and c. 1914, he visited the Mediterranean, the Black Sea, South and West Africa, Mexico, West Indies, Brazil, China, Japan & S. Africa before attempting to start gold mining in Australia. None of this can be verified. However, by 1914 McGuinness does seem to have made his way to Canada, where he was a beggar until joining the Canadian militia.

== Military career ==
=== World War I ===
McGuinness' time in the Canadian militia was brief. By August 1914 he had joined the Royal Navy where he served as part of Admiral Reginald Bacon's Dover patrol off the coast of Cameroon. However, McGuinness deserted in 1916 upon learning of the Easter Rising. Unable to find a way back to Ireland, McGuinness joined the South African Army and fought in the East African campaign. In 1916 McGuinness was captured by the German Schutztruppe of Colonel Paul von Lettow-Vorbeck, but was later able to escape them.

McGuinness claimed in his autobiography to have been the sole survivor of a shipwreck in Delagoa Bay near Mozambique in November 1917. As the story goes, he was aboard the S.S. Vasco de Gama, a Portuguese steamer, when the shipwrecked and sank at the mouth of shark-infested waters.

=== Irish War of Independence ===
McGuinness finally returned to Derry in 1920, and upon arrival threw himself into the ongoing War of Irish Independence. Although McGuinness was viewed as an eccentric, having brought a monkey back from Africa to Derry, he was made the commander of the 3rd Battalion of the Irish Republican Army's (IRA) Northern Capacity, and in that capacity, he assisted in the escape of Frank Carty, the commander of the Sligo IRA, from Derry Gaol in February 1921.

Following a failed bank raid in the Glenties in County Donegal, McGuinness was captured by British forces in June 1921 and charged with the murder of Inspector Robert Johnson in Glasgow, Scotland which had occurred the previous month. However, McGuinness was able to escape from Ebrington Barracks before any serious case could be brought against him. His guards thought he was too weak to escape so they paid little attention to him. A local Derry priest, Friar Coyles, claimed that McGuinness escaped by being smuggled out in a coffin

==== Gun-running with Anita ====
In December 1920, McGuinness was made captain of a ship by the name the "Anita" and sent to the Weimar Republic, where he purchased a large number of firearms. However, on the day the crew were due to depart, McGuinness was observed by the port authorities paying the crew in large notes, which aroused their suspicions. The German police arrested McGuinness and the rest of the crew. McGuinness was brought to trial, but Robert Briscoe was able to arrange and paid for a good lawyer on McGuinness' behalf. Before a sympathetic German court, McGuinness' gun-running against the British Empire was deemed to be a minor offence and he was charged a token fine of 2,000 Deutschmarks. After passing sentence, the German judge wished McGuinness, "better luck next time". The incident caused an uproar back in the United Kingdom. While Michael Collins officially denied all knowledge of McGuinness or his gun-running; some sources credit Collins himself with ordering McGuinness to Germany, if nothing else, to get the eccentric McGuinness "out of the way".

In July 1921, McGuinness was again sent to Weimar Germany by Liam Mellows to purchase more weapons.

==== Gun-running with Frieda ====
In November 1921, McGuinness jokingly claimed to have established the first-ever "Irish navy" after he successfully purchased a tugboat named "Frieda" in Hamburg, Germany with funds supplied by Robert Briscoe, which he again used to run guns. Crewed by German sailors and laden full of Gewehr 98 rifles, and Mauser C96 pistols, the Frieda originally sailed for Helvick, County Waterford but, as the ship was nine days late on its rendezvous due to bad weather, there was no one there to greet it, and the ship was forced by fog to offload near Waterford City. McGuinness went ashore himself and was able to bring back a group of IRA men led by Vincent White, Lord Mayor of Waterford, to unload the cargo. The men toasted then the successful operation with a round of German schnapps.

Although the Frieda had delivered one of the biggest supplies of weapons yet to the IRA, none of them would ever be used against the British, as a ceasefire between the Irish and the British had been called in June 1921 and a peace treaty would soon be signed.

=== Irish Civil War ===
Following the signing of the Anglo-Irish Treaty and the ensuing Irish Civil War, McGuinness supported and supplied the Anti-Treaty IRA but did not take part directly in any further fighting, feeling that the Anti-Treaty IRA was militarily incompetent. Sources differ on what became of the Frieda following her successful gun-running in November 1921, but what is not disputed is that McGuinness and Robert Briscoe continued to work together. Together, they secured funding to purchase a motorised schooner named Hanna and once again ran guns from Germany to Ireland. Using the experience of the Frieda and Waterford as a template, McGuinness successfully brought his cargo to Helvick, County Waterford on 2 April 1922 to deliver what was reportedly "the largest military shipment ever to reach the IRA". Estimates of the size of the arms shipment vary - a cargo of 300 guns and 20,000 rounds of ammunition or 1500 rifles, 2000 pistols and 1.7 million rounds of ammunition.

Unfortunately for the Anti-Treaty forces, they were never able to make use of the shipment, as just one month after the landing Anti-Treaty IRA Chief of Staff issued a ceasefire order, bringing an end to the Civil War. The arms brought abroad by the Hanna would be seized by the National Army.

== 1920s ==
Following the end of the Irish revolutionary period, McGuinness did not end his restless ways. In 1922 he claimed to have been arrested in Berlin for conspiring with Bulgarian revolutionaries and released on the condition that he leave Germany. In 1923, McGuinness immigrated to New York City where he took up work as a building contractor.

McGuinness claimed that in 1926 he had gone to China to serve in Chiang Kai-Shek's forces for a time.

=== Antarctic explorer ===
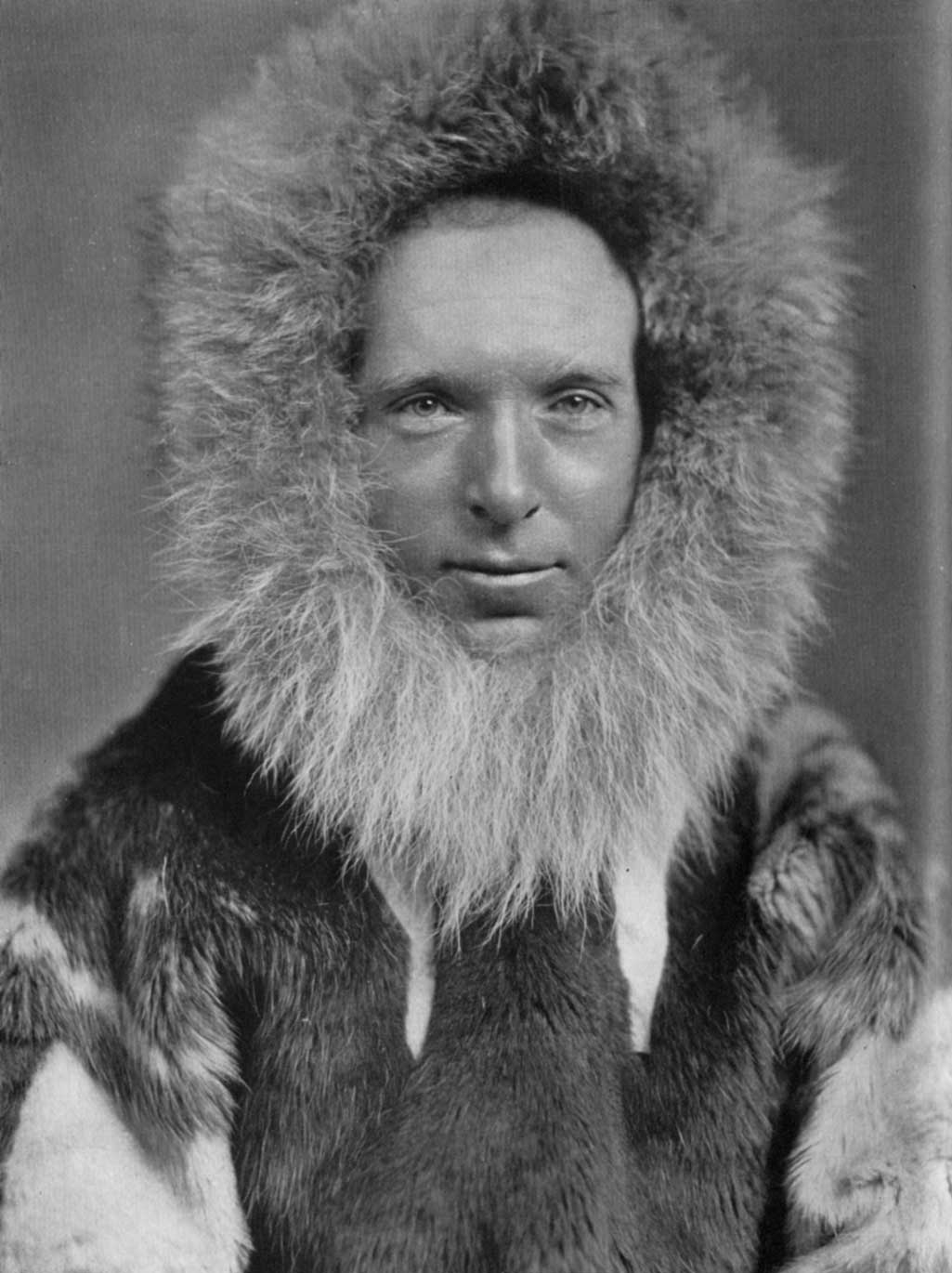
McGuinness in fur gear previous to his Antarctic expedition

In 1928 McGuinness joined the crew of Admiral Richard E. Byrd, who was undertaking an expedition to the Antarctic. McGuinness served as a navigation officer as part of the successful endeavour. Upon their return to New York City in 1929, McGuinness presented the Irish-American Mayor of New York Jimmy Walker with an Irish flag that McGuinness alleged had been flown over the South Pole. A claim by McGuinness to have received a congressional medal from the secretary of the navy in 1930 is not generally considered credible.

== 1930s ==
=== Rum-runner ===
In the midst of the now ongoing Great Depression as well Prohibition in the United States, McGuinness turned back to the life of smuggling cargo between countries, when in 1930 he began smuggling rum from Canada into the United States. However, his fortunes were quickly dashed when his ship and its cargo were impounded in the summer of 1931.

=== Working in Soviet Russia ===
For two years in c. 1932, McGuinness claimed to have gone to Soviet Russia to experience a communist-run country, where he worked as a harbour master in the port city of Murmansk.

=== Spanish Civil War ===
In late 1936, McGuinness arrived in Spain to fight in the International Brigades on behalf of the Republican side in the Spanish Civil War. However, his time spent fighting seems to have been brief and he soon deserted following disagreements with the authorities. Upon his return to Ireland in 1937, McGuinness wrote a series of articles for the Irish Independent entitled "I fought with the Reds".

== 1940s ==
=== Collaborating with Germany ===
By 1942, McGuinness had converted his considerable maritime experience into becoming a chief petty officer with the Irish Naval Service at their base in Haulbowline, County Cork. It was that same year that McGuinness sent offers by phone and by letter to the German Foreign Office legation in Dublin, offering to give them information about Irish shipping. McGuinness was caught by Irish Directorate of Military Intelligence under Colonel Dan Bryan. At his court-martial, McGuinness was found guilty of espionage and sentenced to seven years in prison. However, he was released towards the end of "The Emergency", in 1945. On 27 May 1947, the Irish Independent and Irish Times noted that McGuinness, alongside several other Irish republicans, was one of the mourners at the funeral of German Abwehr spymaster Hermann Goertz.

== Death ==
McGuinness is believed to have died on 4 December 1947 when he drowned alongside four other crew members of the schooner Isaalt that he was piloting off on Ballymoney Strand near Gorey in County Wexford. Two members of the crew survived, managing to swim ashore; the ship was a mere 100 metres from land.

However, members of McGuinness' family expressed doubt over the years. A nephew claimed to have encountered McGuinness on the London Underground in 1955. Upon their gazes meeting, McGuinness is reported to have smiled and said four simple words: "You never saw me".

== Literary works ==
=== Sailor of Fortune (Nomad) ===
McGuinness' first book was published as "Sailor of Fortune" in the United States and published as "Nomad" in the United Kingdom. This eighteen chapter book, published in 1935 is an autobiography of McGuinness' and his travels. The memoir details his life in the army as well as his various adventures which include shipwrecks and imprisonment.

McGuinness' publisher, Methuen Publishing, was sued by John William Nixon on account of the book. In Sailor of Fortune/Nomad, McGuinness makes reference to a thinly disguised Nixon and implies that Nixon was the former RUC detective inspector who, in 1922, led a gang in Belfast who carried out the McMahon killings. In March 1935, Nixon, by then Member of Parliament in Northern Ireland, received £1,250 in damages.

=== Behind the Red Curtain ===
"Behind the Red Curtain", published in the United Kingdom in 1936 is a chronicle of McGuinness' time in Russia where he worked as a harbour master for the Port of Saint Petersburg. The usage of the "curtain" metaphor in the title may be one of the earliest reference applied to the Soviet Union.

=== Irish Independent Spanish Civil War feature articles ===
McGuinness wrote a six-piece article featured in the Irish Independent Newspaper in 1937. The introduction titled, "True Story That Will Thrill You," depicts McGuinness's account of his adventures at the time of the Spanish Civil War. The first piece, entitled "Adventures in War-Torn Spain," continues his account of this period. The second piece is entitled "Foul War on Religion." The third piece is called "Massacre in A Cemetery." The fourth piece is called "Under Fire by the Enemy." The fifth piece is called "Among those about to Die." These featured articles depict Charles "Nomad" McGuinness's adventures at the time of the Spanish Civil War. His articles mainly focus on the destruction, death, and corruption related to the war in Spain.

== Personal life ==
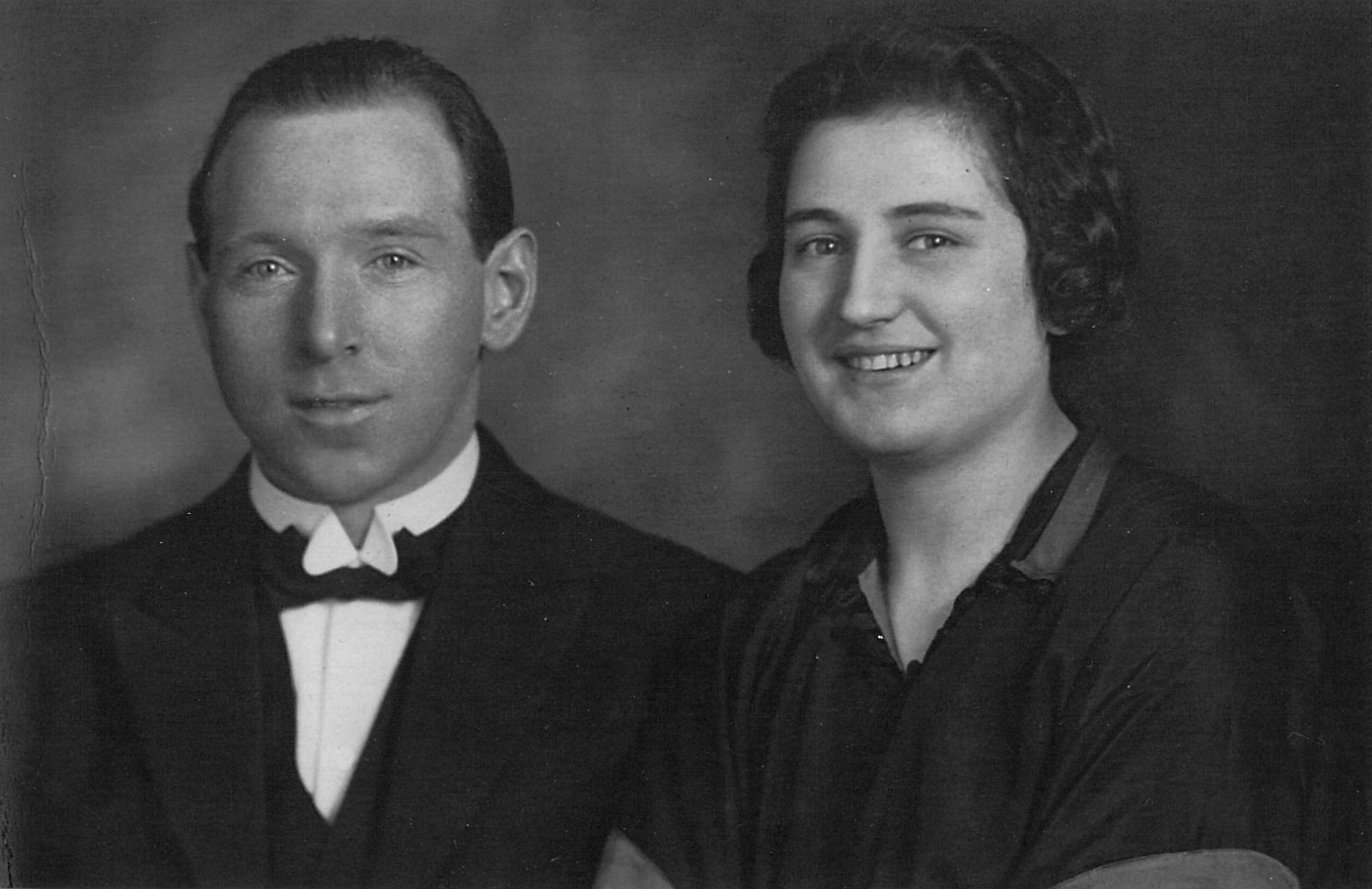
McGuinness alongside his first wife Klara Zuckerkandel, circa 1921

McGuinness had three wives in his lifetime. His first wife, Klara Zuckerkandel (referred to as "Claire" in Ireland) was German, whom he married in Vienna then moved to New York where they had their son, Patrick Joseph. Little is known about his second wife, other than her burial in the City cemetery. His third wife was buried in Donegal.

=== Tattoos ===
As a sailor for much of his life, McGuinness engaged in the maritime culture of tattooing his body. According to Robert Briscoe, "from the soles of his feet to his neck, he was a picture gallery, with everything from mermaids to alligators". In addition to statements that almost his entire body was tattooed, a number of sources allege that McGuinness had the Union Jack tattooed to the soles of his feet so that he would forever be 'trampling on "the butcher's apron'".
