= Christmas Raid =

1939 Irish Republican Army raid in Ireland

The Christmas Raid was an attack on 23 December 1939 by the Irish Republican Army (IRA) against the Irish Army and the Phoenix Park Magazine Fort—Ireland's largest munitions dump. The attack resulted in the capture of the munitions dump by the IRA and the seizure of a huge quantity of weapons. Although the operation was initially successful, two of the raiders were captured shortly after the raid and, in the following days, most of the stolen military equipment was recovered and several IRA volunteers were arrested.

== The fort ==
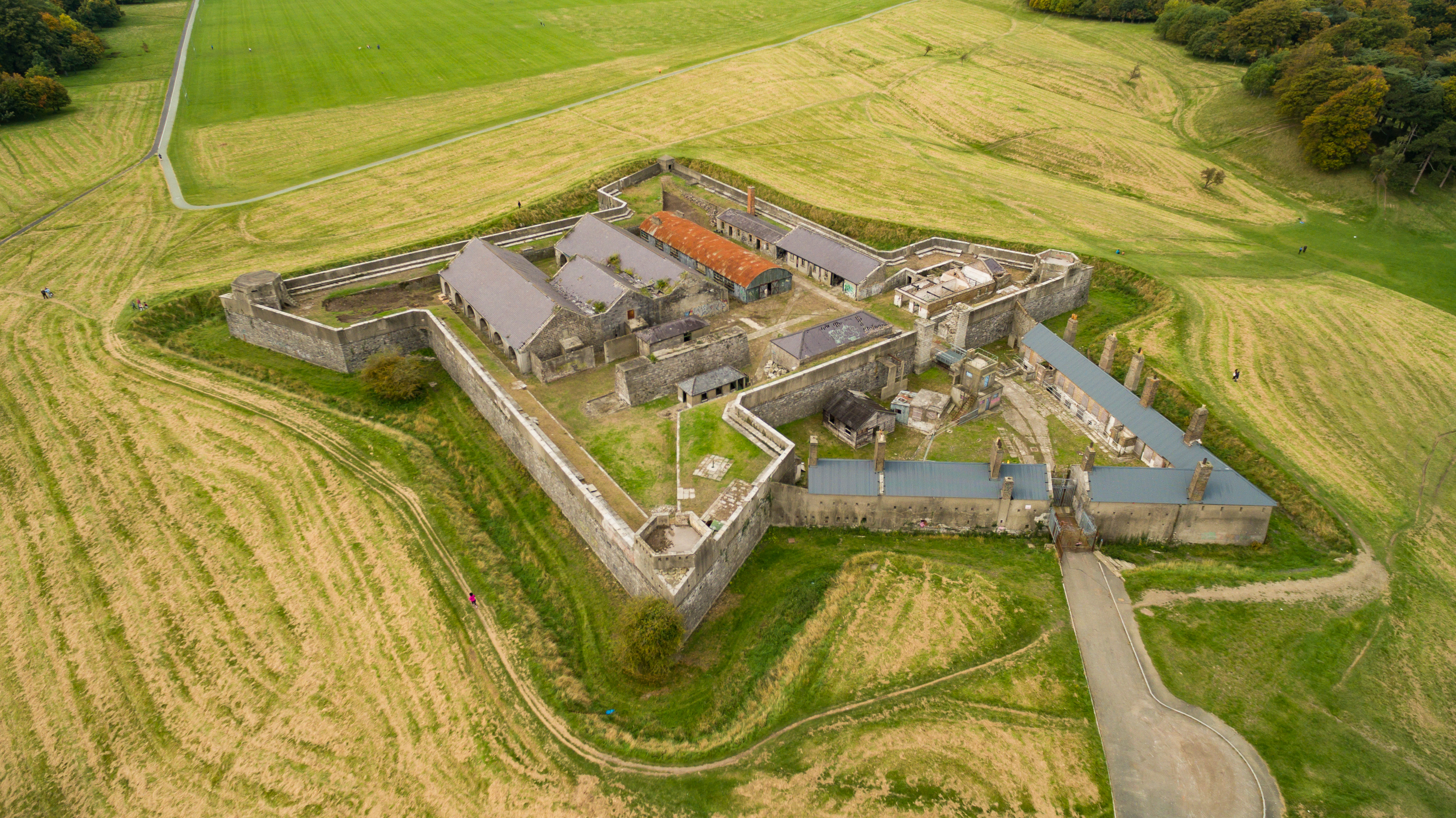
Aerial view of the Magazine Fort

The Dublin Magazine Fort was built in 1735. The fort is in the west of the city, north of the River Liffey within Phoenix Park. The building is located in the south-eastern part of the park, close by a wooded ridge, and has a commanding view of the surrounding area. It was occupied by the British Army during the period of British rule, and after independence was utilised by the Irish Army to store their stocks of arms and ammunition.

== Reasons for raid ==
The IRA was still involved with the Sabotage Campaign at the time of the raid, with a lot of units either interned, on the run, in Britain, or recently deported from Britain. A number of members of the Army Council were also on the run, trying to evade capture by the Garda Síochána (Irish police). The stated reason for a raid on the Fort being ordered was that, although the IRA had many Thompson submachine guns (imported with the help of Clan na Gael over the preceding decade), the .45 ACP ammunition used in these guns was not easily available in continental Europe. It so happened that the Irish Army also used the Thompson and had large supplies of ammunition. Permission was sought to steal ammunition, either from the Magazine Fort or nearby Islandbridge Barracks. Acting Chief of Staff in Seán Russell's absence, Stephen Hayes, gave the order.

A raid on the Fort was not a new idea—it had been floated initially in 1937, but IRA Chief of Staff Mick Fitzpatrick had dismissed the idea as unworkable, because there would be nowhere to store the stolen ammunition. Hayes, on hearing that the raid was possible, felt he should take the risk. The Christmas season was chosen as the perfect time for the operation, as security was expected to be even more lax than usual. However, the people operating the arms dumps had not expected the sheer amount of weaponry taken during the raid.

Many IRA members had been interned under the Offences against the State Act 1939 on the outbreak of the war, but released in December when the Supreme Court ruled in State (Burke) v. Lennon that the relevant section of the 1939 act violated the constitution. Some of those released participated in the raid.

== The garrison ==
The Magazine Fort did not have its own guard troops. These were supplied from infantry units stationed in the Command area. That particular night, the 7th (Dublin) Infantry Battalion, a reserve battalion stationed at Portobello Barracks (now Cathal Brugha Barracks), was responsible for supplying the guard, and the fire picket was supplied by a unit stationed in Islandbridge Barracks (now Clancy Barracks).

On the evening of the Raid, the officer responsible for the defence of the fort, the same man who had filled the post for twenty-four years, had the following at his disposal for guard duty:

- One Non-Commissioned Officer (NCO)
- Six men armed with rifles and one Lewis gun
- One Military Policeman (MP)
- A fire picket, consisting of one NCO and four men, also equipped with rifles.

The guard party were warned for duty on the evening of 22 December and given precise instructions as to their duties for the next morning.

== The raid ==
Around 2000 hrs that night, according to the statements of the guards, the officer commanding left his post to go into the city. To do this the MP guarding the gates had to switch on the outer lights illuminating the entrance, open the inner gate, then open the outer gate. This was against standard operating procedure, but seemed to be a regular occurrence for visitors arriving and people leaving the fort. Once the officer had cleared the gate, the MP closed both gates and went back to his post. A little later, the son of the officer-in-charge appeared at the gate and was admitted. Around 2030, the gate bell rang again and the MP saw a civilian who said he had a parcel to deliver to the officer-in-charge. At his court martial, the MP testified that he answered that he would take the parcel and bent down to unbolt the gate, and when he stood up straight again he saw the muzzle of a revolver pointed in his face. The unidentified man told the MP to open the gate fully and put his hands up. At this point the IRA team appeared from both inside and outside the fort, confiscating the weapons of the sentry and MP. The sentry on guard at the time testified in contrast that the MP had left both gates open and, when the gun was pointed in his face, had run in the other direction crying for help. At that point, another man appeared from inside the fort and disarmed him.

The two hostages were then forced to act as human shields for the two intruders to the guardroom where the remaining soldiers were caught by surprise and surrendered without a fight. Whilst this was happening a second IRA team overcame and disarmed the fire picket troops. At this point, all the troops attached to the fort and the gatekeeper were held prisoner until around 2220 hrs that evening and made no attempt to resist their captors. During this time, the captives heard 'many' heavy lorries coming and going from the depot. At 2220 hrs the IRA locked the prisoners in the 'C' Magazine area, which the raiders had completely emptied of weaponry. They were warned not to give away details to the authorities that could identify them.

By this time, an alarm had been raised at Islandbridge Barracks after a lorry failed to stop when driving through the gate. It was 2250 by the time a party of soldiers was dispatched from Portobello Barracks to investigate what was happening at the fort. They managed to capture two of the raiders, who were seen hiding near the fort's entrance. In the meantime, the duty officer at Portobello had raised the general alarm. Around midnight, a new guard was ordered posted at the Magazine Fort and orders were issued for the arrest of the old guard.

A total of 1,084,000 rounds of ammunition had been taken and removed in thirteen lorries with no casualties or hindrance.

== Recapture of the ammunition ==
Over the next three to four days a massive nationwide hunt was launched to find the stolen items. On 1 January 1940 it was reported that almost three-quarters of the ammunition had been recovered, a total of 850,000 rounds.

- two and a half tons were seized in Dundalk, County Louth,
- eight tons in Swords, County Dublin,
- sixty-six cases of Thompsons and ammunition in South Armagh (2 and a half tons captured by the Royal Ulster Constabulary (RUC)),
- one hundred crates containing 120,000 rounds in Straffan, County Kildare.

In addition, some IRA volunteers were caught storing the ammunition, and were arrested.

== Aftermath of raid ==
The raid had turned into another disaster for the IRA to contend with. The volume of material stolen, and the massive hunt to recover it that followed, turned up all the stolen ammunition and weapons plus more, along with the IRA volunteers attempting to store it. The positive effect on morale that the raid had made evaporated. The Oireachtas was recalled on 3 January 1940 and in two days the government rushed through amendments to both the Emergency Powers Act (EPA; to extend its internment powers to Irish civilians) and the Offences Against the State Act (OSA; to re-establish non-emergency internment within the parameters of the Burke v. Lennon judgment). Many IRA members were re-interned for the rest of war; additionally, the OSA's Special Criminal Court and the EPA's military tribunal were used for non-jury trials of IRA members.

== See also ==
- The Emergency
- Irish Republican Army (1922–1969)
- Sabotage Campaign (IRA)
- Northern Campaign (IRA)

== Further information/sources ==
- Mark M. Hull, Irish Secrets. German Espionage in Wartime Ireland 1939–1945, Dublin:Irish Academic Press, 2003, ISBN 0-7165-2756-1
- IRA volunteer Liam Brady's recollection of the Christmas Raid and the part he played in it, is archived here.
