= Fianna Éireann =

Irish nationalist youth organisation

- Founder: Constance Markievicz
- Dates active: 16 August 1909 - Present
- Headquarters: Dublin
- Active regions: Republic of Ireland; Northern Ireland
- Ideology: Irish republicanism Irish nationalism
- Wars: Irish War of Independence; Irish Civil War
- Website: nafiannaeireann.wordpress.com

Na Fianna Éireann (The Fianna of Ireland), known as the Fianna ("Soldiers of Ireland"), is an Irish nationalist youth organisation founded by Constance Markievicz in 1909, with later help from Bulmer Hobson. Fianna members were involved in setting up the Irish Volunteers, and had their own circle of the Irish Republican Brotherhood (IRB). They took part in the 1914 Howth gun-running and (as Volunteer members) in the 1916 Easter Rising. They were active in the War of Independence and many took the anti-Treaty side in the Civil War.

The Fianna were declared an illegal organisation by the government of the Irish Free State in 1931. This was reversed when Fianna Fáil came to power in 1932, but re-introduced in 1938. During the splits in the Republican movement of the later part of the 20th century, the Fianna and Cumann na mBan supported Provisional Sinn Féin in 1969 and Republican Sinn Féin in 1986. The Fianna have been a proscribed organisation in Northern Ireland since 1920.

== Origins ==
An earlier "Fianna" was organised "to serve as a Junior Hurling League to promote the study of the Irish Language" on 26 June 1902 at the Catholic Boys' Hall, Falls Road, in West Belfast, the brainchild of Bulmer Hobson. Hobson, a Quaker influenced by suffragism and nationalism, joined the Irish Republican Brotherhood in 1904 and was an early member of Sinn Féin during its monarchist-nationalist period, alongside Arthur Griffith and Constance Markievicz. Hobson later relocated to Dublin and the Fianna organisation collapsed in Belfast. Markievicz, inspired by the rapid growth of Baden-Powell's Boy Scouts, formed sometime before July 1909 the Red Branch Knights, a Dublin branch of Irish National Boy Scouts. After discussions involving Hobson, Markievicz, suffragist and labour activist Helena Molony and Seán McGarry, the Irish National Boy Scouts changed their name to Na Fianna Éireann at a meeting in 34 Lower Camden Street, Dublin, on 16 August 1909 (the building today marked with a commemorative plaque), at which Hobson was elected as president (thus ensuring a strong IRB influence), Markievicz as vice-president and Pádraig Ó Riain as secretary. Seán Heuston was the leader of the Fianna on Dublin's northside, while Cornelius "Con" Colbert was the leader on the south side. The Fianna formed as a Nationalist alternative to Powell's Scouts with the aim to achieve the full independence of Ireland by training and teaching scouting and military exercises, Irish history, and the Irish language.

== Early years ==
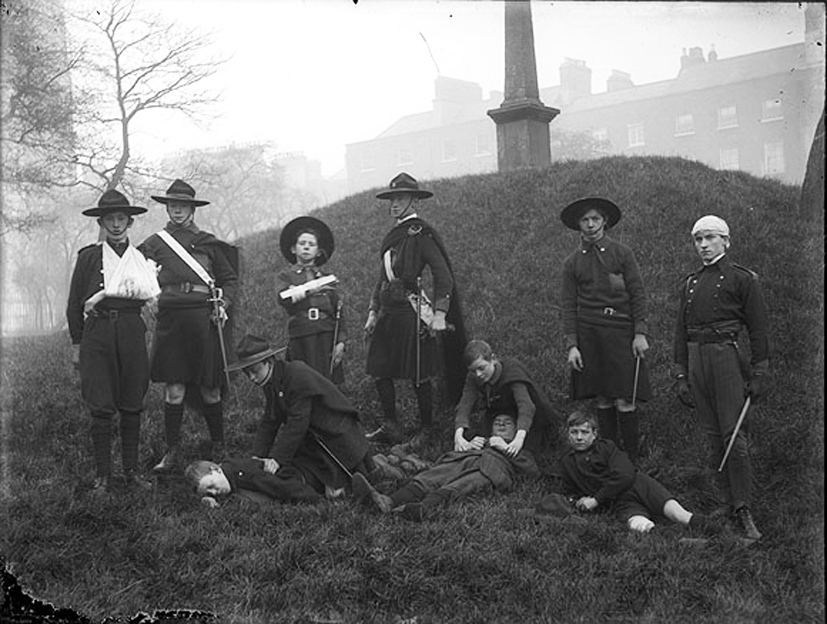
Fianna Scouts engaged in field medical training, c.1914

In 1913, a Fianna instructional handbook was published and produced by Pádraig Ó Riain with articles being contributed by Patrick Pearse and Roger Casement, as well as advertisements from suppliers of uniforms and equipment. The timing coincided with the Irish Volunteers being established and the book was widely used by them Countess Markievicz bought a large rambling house at Ranelagh, Surrey House. It became the unofficial headquarters of the Fianna for some time. The older boys would gather and train here, and a mini firing range was set up in the basement. The boys also had a radio set in operation, which led to a raid by the Dublin Metropolitan Police. A separate HQ was later set up in 12 D'Olier Street.

The Irish Republican Brotherhood (IRB) focused on recruiting any members who had reached the age of seventeen, and in 1912, Hobson started an IRB circle within the Fianna named the John Mitchel Literary and Debating Society, whose members included Colbert, Ó Riain, Heuston, Garry Holohan, Desmond Ryan, Liam Mellows and Barney Mellows.

== Irish Volunteers ==
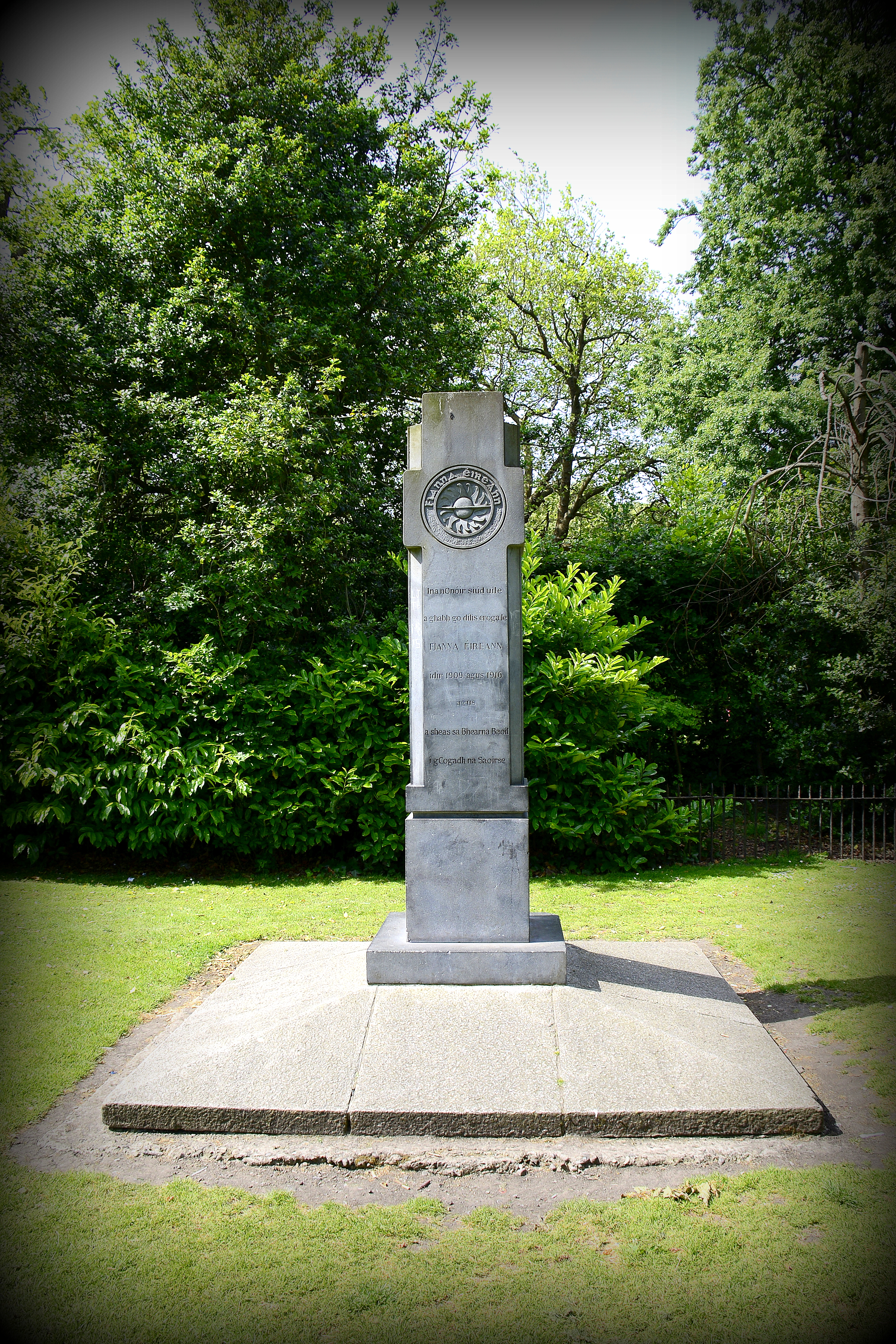
Fianna memorial at St Stephen's Green, Dublin, Ireland

The Fianna played an active part during the 1913 Dublin Lock-out. A Fianna member, Patsy O'Connor, died after being battened on the head by a Dublin Metropolitan Police man while giving first aid to an injured man.

As the Fianna was organised four years earlier than the Irish Volunteers, and as many of its members were now young adults, fully trained in many aspects of military discipline, many young members transferred to the Volunteers on the army's foundation in November 1913. The committee which set up the Irish Volunteers had three Fianna members on it. Con Colbert, Michael Lonergan, Éamon Martin and Padraig Ó'Riain were prominent in training Irish Volunteers. Seamus Pounch was instrumental in the training of the Cumann na mBan women's auxiliary in 1914.

=== 1914 gun running ===
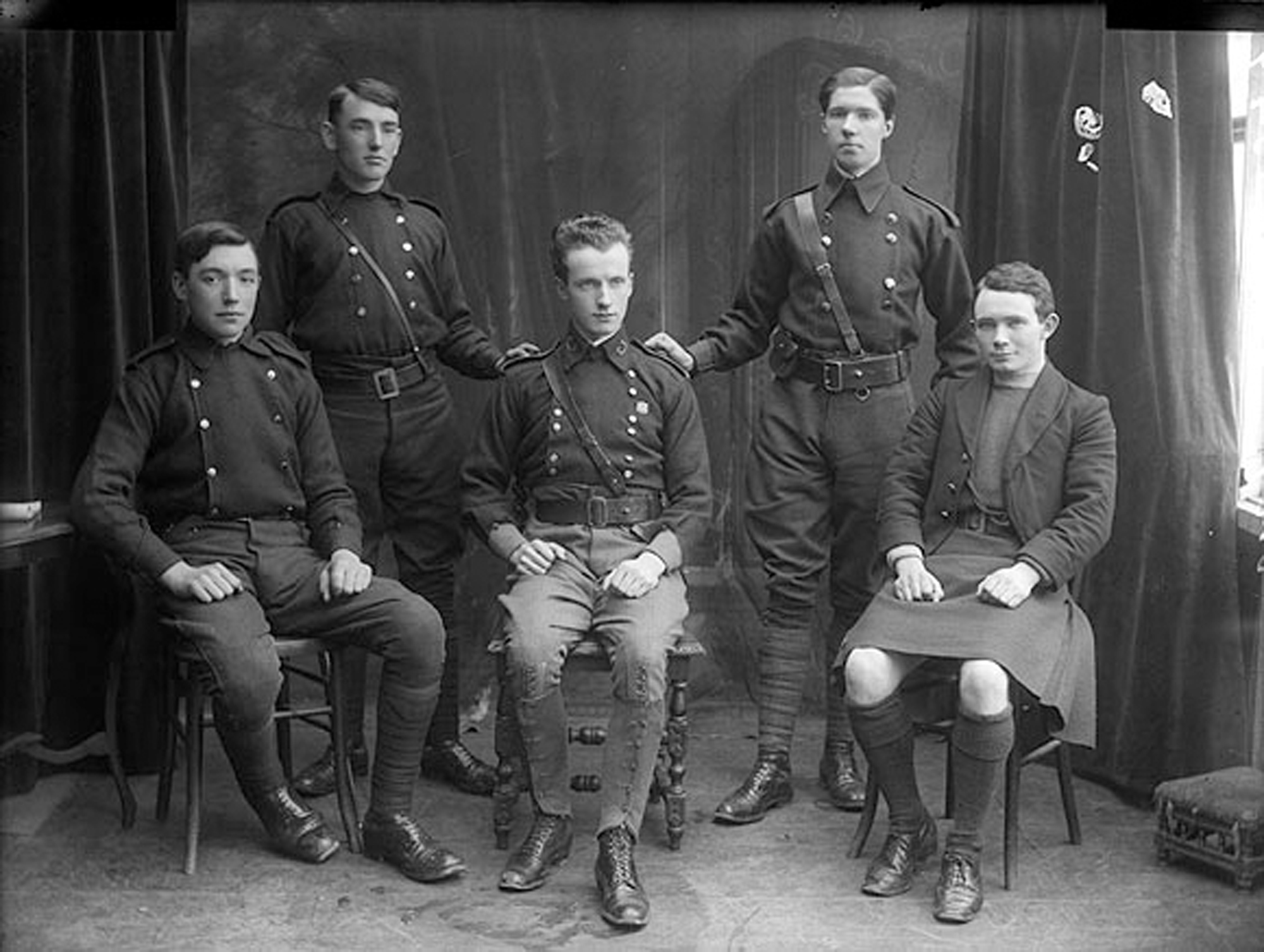
Fianna Éireann Council, between 1912 and 1915. Front row (left to right) Patrick Holohan, Michael Lonergan and Con Colbert. Back row (left to right) Garry Holohan and Padraig Ó Riain

The Fianna played a part in gun-running in Kilcoole and Howth. Fianna members brought their trek-cart to Howth Pier to meet the Asgard. The trek-cart was full of home-made batons, and these were distributed to the Volunteers on the pier. The cart was then used to carry the surplus rifles back to the city. At Clontarf, the DMP and British military were awaiting the return of the volunteers and a confrontation ensued. Fianna officers detoured with their gun-laden cart up the Howth Road, arriving eventually at Kilmore Road, Artane, where the arms were stored for later recovery.

John Redmond forced his nominees to be added the Volunteers' central committee in 1914, leading to a split at the outbreak of World War I. Bulmer Hobson's help to Redmond, and his subsequent opposition to the Easter Rising (he was kept under armed guard by Seán Mac Diarmada on Easter Monday 1916 as the Rising broke out, and held until the rising was under way, upon which he fled home to Belfast) led to Hobson's being sidelined by the republican movement and removed from any leadership role for the rest of his life.

=== Easter Rising (1916) ===
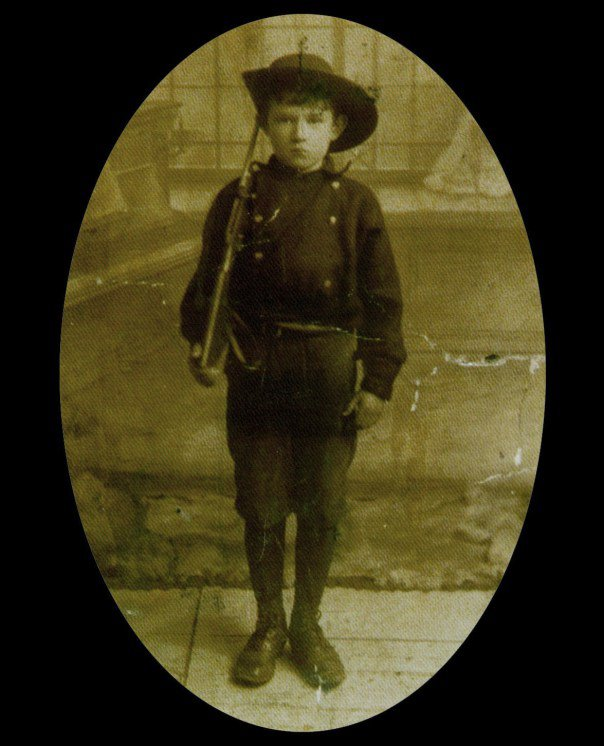
Fian Seán Healy, the youngest casualty in the Easter Rising on the Republican side at 15 years old

Among the first shots fired during the Rising were by Fianna members who attacked and captured the Magazine Fort in the Phoenix Park. A son of the Magazine Fort's commander was shot dead by an IRA volunteer, Garry Holohan, as he [the son] ran to raise the alarm at Islandbridge.

The Fianna fought in all the garrisons involved in the 1916 Easter Rising. Though they were by then members of the Irish Volunteers, Seán Heuston and Con Colbert were still regarded as Fianna members. Heuston was commander of the Mendicity Institution garrison, while Colbert was under the command of Éamonn Ceannt at Watkins Brewery. Heuston and Colbert were executed for their part in the Rising.

Markievicz and Molony fought as members of the Irish Citizen Army (the Irish Volunteers were an exclusively male force); Markievicz, operating under Michael Mallin at the College of Surgeons, was sentenced to death but eventually reprieved, but kept in prison longer than any other person involved in the Rising, often in solitary confinement.

In Galway, Liam Mellows was in command of activities, but escaped capture and got to the United States, where he raised help for the War of Independence. (Mellows later returned to Ireland and was executed by order of the Irish Free State Government while imprisoned during the Irish Civil War.)

After the garrison abandoned the GPO and retreated to Moore Street, James Connolly gave command of the GPO to Seán McLoughlin, a Fianna officer. His orders were to oversee the safe retreat of the rest of the occupants.

Several of the Fianna were killed during the Rising. Seán Healy was shot dead at Phibsboro while delivering dispatches. Seán Howard and Seán Ryan died in similar fashion. Volunteers under the command of Fianna officer Paddy Holahan captured and burned down the Linenhall Barracks. Eamon Martin, a future Chief of Staff, was seriously wounded at the Broadstone Railway Station. At least fifteen Fianna officers from the Dublin Brigade were later interned at Frongoch internment camp, North Wales after the Rising was put down. Seán Heuston and Con Colbert were executed for their role in the Rising.

== Post 1916 reorganisation ==
The Fianna was first to reorganise after the Easter Rising of 1916. A provisional governing committee was set up in Dublin in May 1916, whose members included Eamon Martin, Seamus Pounch, Theo Fitzgerald, Liam Staines, and Joe Reynolds. All had evaded the round-up after the Rising. This committee functioned until January 1917, when it handed over command to the newly released senior officers. In February 1917, a section of the Fianna marched in full uniform to mass at Blanchardstown, County Dublin for Michael Mallin, who had been executed following the Easter Rising. Garry Holohan reported that "As the police did not interfere, we got courage and got bolder and bolder. On one route march, the police at James Street stopped us and an Inspector of the DMP grabbed me. However, as the Fianna Scouts became so threatening, I was released."L. O'Sullivan, John (24 September 2014), ""1916 Easter Rising"", Easter Rising in BBC, vol. BBC, no. II, BBC: Ahmed Ramadan, pp. pp, archived from the original on 1 August 2023 Alt URL

A year after the Rising, a large demonstration was held outside the burnt-out shell of Liberty Hall. A large contingent of Dublin Metropolitan Police (DMP), including one ranked inspector, John Mills, arrived and the Riot Act was read to the crowd. The police waded into the crowd with batons to arrest those addressing the crowd, including Cathal Brugha and George Noble (Count) Plunkett. While escorting the prisoners, Inspector Mills was struck a mortal blow to the head with a camán. Later Fianna witness statements indicated that the blow was struck by Eamon Murray, a young Fianna officer, who was O/C of a Sluagh (branch) on Parnell Square. He made off along Abbey Street, pursued by a DMP man. He was cornered at Marlborough Street, but he or another Fianna member drew a pistol and the policeman backed off. He was sheltered by Constance Markievicz then smuggled to the United States, where he remained until the Truce of 1921, and later fought with the anti-Treaty IRA during the Civil War.

An intensive recruiting campaign was set in motion throughout the city and county after the earlier reorganisation of January 1917, and it proved to be a tremendous success. Recruits came in large numbers and new companies were formed. In June, the Dublin Battalion had become so large and unwieldy, that it was decided to set up a Brigade structure of two battalions. The county was simply split in two, with the Liffey as the divide. South of the Liffey became the 1st Battalion and north of the Liffey became the 2nd Battalion. The Dublin Brigade Staff in June 1917 comprised Garry Holohan (Commandant), P.J. Stephenson (Adjutant) and Joe Reynolds (QM).

The Fianna continued to defy the British ban on marching and parading, and drilled openly with hurleys in open defiance. This led to clashes with the DMP and the Royal Irish Constabulary. In July 1917 the whole Dublin Battalion went on a route march through the south city and county. Efforts were made by the DMP to stop the march and break it up at Terenure and Rathmines DMP stations, but the marchers broke through the cordons at both points. The march continued to the GPO, where the parade was dismissed. Seán Saunders recalled being arrested at Milltown with Roddy Connolly (son of James Connolly), Hugo MacNeill, Theo Fitzgerald, Seán McLoughlin and Garry Holohan.

=== Army Agreement ===
It came to the attention of GHQ Staff c1918 that in many areas around the country the Fianna was controlled by the local units of the Irish Volunteers. A meeting of Fianna GHQ representatives and Volunteer representatives was held in Dublin to discuss the problem. What emerged from this meeting was the Army Agreement. From that point on, the Volunteers would not seek to control Fianna in their areas. Those who reached the age of seventeen had transferred to the Volunteers; this would now cease and any transfer would be voluntary. The volunteer O/C was to liaise with the Fianna O/C on all local matters, and due consideration was to be extended to Fianna.

== War of Independence ==
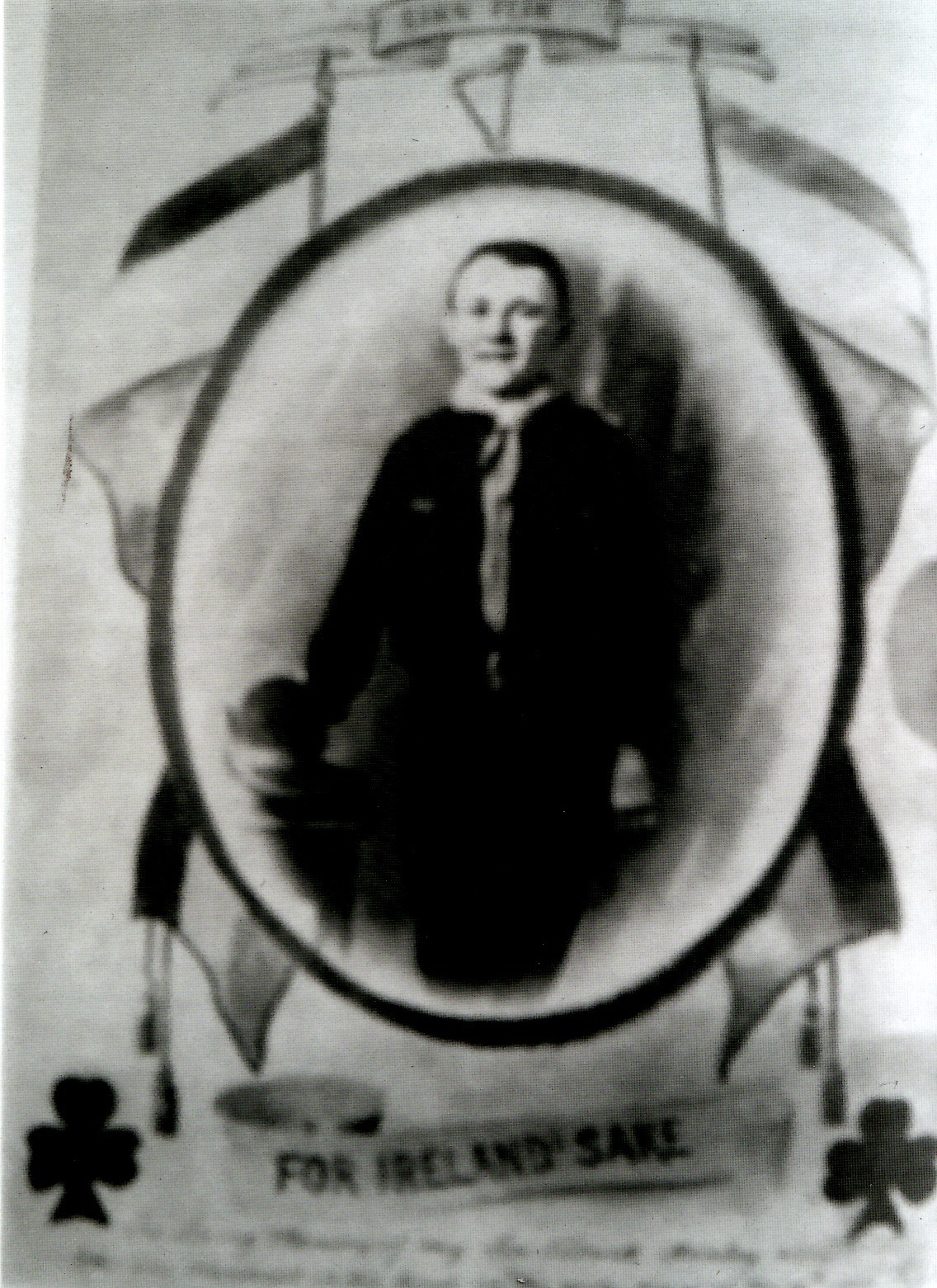
Fianna Scout Patrick Hanley, killed in action by the RIC in Cork, 27 Nov 1920

During the "Tan War", Fianna members featured prominently in every brigade area. Some lost their lives or were imprisoned. In a picture taken of the West Mayo Brigade Active Service Unit in 1921, ten of the thirty in the photograph had been members of the Westport Fianna Sluagh, as had Tom Derrig, who rose to the rank of Adjutant General during the Civil War.

During the Truce of July to September 1921, the Fianna devoted a great amount of time to training. At least three full-time training camps were set up to train potential officers. One of these camps was held at Kilmore Road, Artane, Dublin and another at Kilmashogue Mountain. At the 1921 Ard Fheis held in Dublin Munster was described as having 84 Fianna sluaithe (branches); Ulster 20; Connacht 10, and Leinster 41. Kerry had 37 Sluaithe, Cork 24, and Dublin 16. The Fianna held discussions all over the country where they debated the terms of the Anglo-Irish Treaty. The Fianna rejected the Treaty and called for all members to continue work for a Republic. In support of this, the Dublin Brigade's Fianna marched to Smithfield where they were reviewed by senior Republican leaders.

== Civil War ==
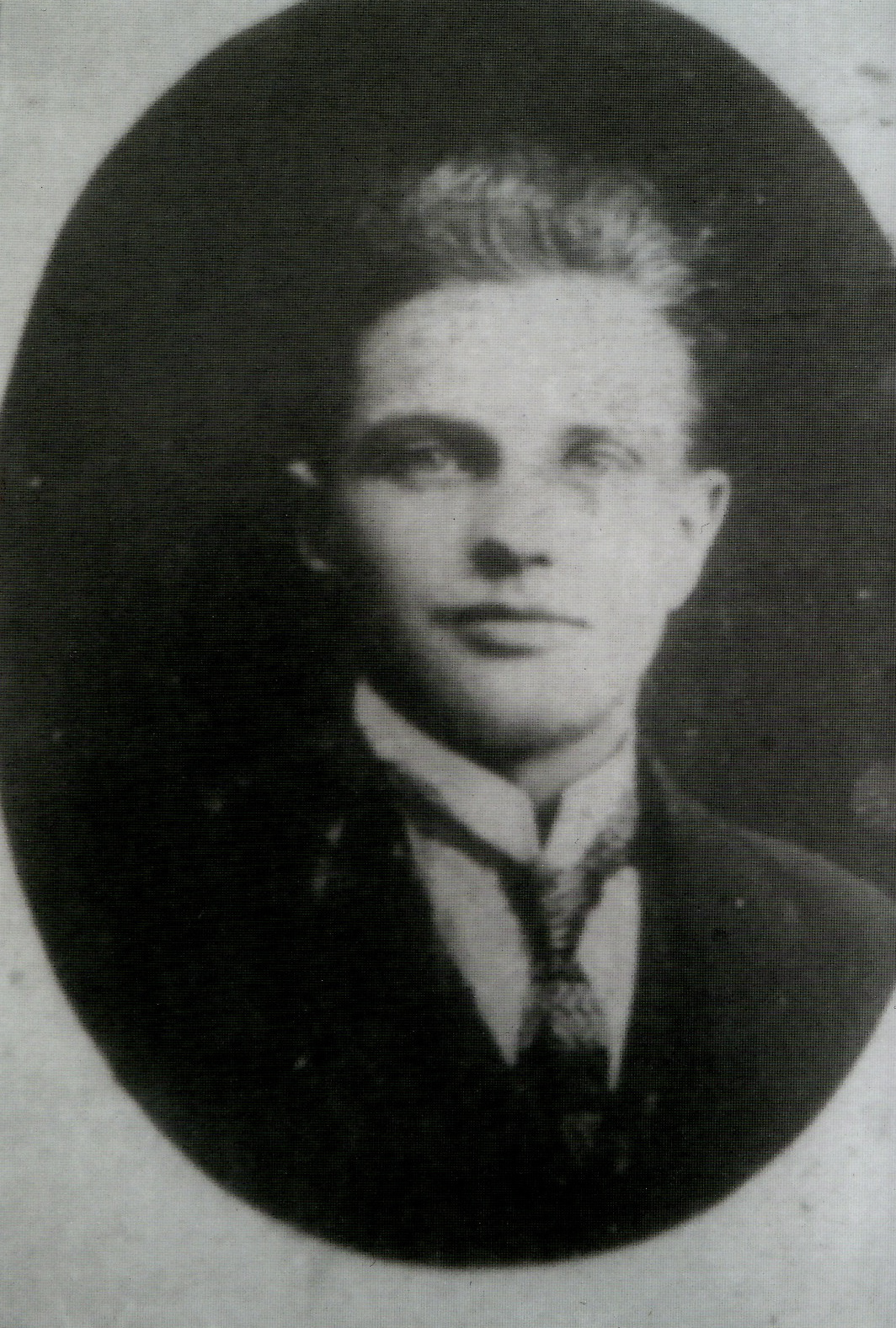
Brigadier Alf Colley, killed during Irish Civil War at Whitehall, August 1922

Fianna Éireann played a major part in the Civil War fighting, especially in Dublin. When the Four Courts garrison was attacked in July 1922, a second front was created to relieve the Four Courts. The Dublin Brigade of the Fianna provided many leaders in this period. All along the eastern side of O'Connell Street buildings were taken over and barricaded. Parnell Square and Parnell Street were similarly barricaded. Fianna, under their new Brigadier, Seán Harling, took over 35 North Great Georges Street as a barracks.

In August 1922 (the same month in which Michael Collins and Arthur Griffith) died, the Fianna sustained a heavy blow when two of their senior officers in Dublin, Seán Cole and Alf Colley, were shot dead by Free State Army Intelligence members at The Thatch, Whitehall.

Four hundred officers and boys of the Fianna had taken part in the Dublin fighting of 1922. By October of that year, the only active members were in an eight-member active service unit led by Frank Sherwin.

The bullet-riddled corpses of three teenaged Fianna Scouts, Edwin Hughes (17), Joseph Rogers (16) and Brendan Holohan (16), were found at The Quarries, Naas Road, Clondalkin on 28 November 1922. They were all from the Drumcondra area and had been putting up republican posters in the Clonliffe Road district. They were arrested by a high-ranking Free State officer, Charlie Dalton (younger brother of Emmet Dalton). The Scouts were brought for interrogation to Wellington Barracks, where Free State Army Intelligence had their HQ. That was the last time that they were seen alive.

When the Free State started to execute Republican prisoners, the first to be shot were four young men who had left the Fianna to join the Irish Republican Army. The executions of Rory O'Connor, Joe McKelvey, Liam Mellows and Dick Barrett became a symbol for the Fianna. They became known as "The Four Martyrs". A prominent ex-Fianna officer, Hugo MacNeill (nephew of Eoin MacNeill), commanded the firing squad. Eamon Martin related that he was a cellmate of Mellows in Mountjoy Prison. Until 1964, an annual concert was held by the Fianna to commemorate their executions. These executions were followed by another group of three, who had similarly graduated from the ranks of the Dublin Brigade of the Fianna.

The Fianna ceased to function as an open organisation by Christmas 1922. All senior Fianna members were being rounded up by the Free State military and CID, and at the brutal internment camp Tintown 3 in The Curragh there was one hut dedicated to Fianna members, some as young as fourteen.

== 1925 Ard Fhéis ==
- Fianna Chief: Constance Markievicz
- Adjutant General: Barney Mellows
- A/Adjutant General: Alfie White
- Director of Organisation: Liam Langley
- A/Director of Organisation: Frank Sherwin
- QMG: Joe Reynolds
- A/QMG: Sean Harling

After internment Sean Harling, former leader of the Fianna, married and eventually fell on hard times. In his own words, he was compromised by the Free State Special Branch and agreed to become an agent for them within the republican movement. He was eventually exposed by Fianna Intelligence Officer Frank Sherwin in 1926. Two former Fianna members made an attempt on his life in 1928, but Harling escaped and shot dead one of his attackers, Tim Coghlan of Inchicore. Harling was secreted out of the country by the Special Branch and lived in the US until his return in 1933 to Ireland.

== Fianna proscribed ==
Fianna Éireann was decimated after the Civil War, and further disintegration occurred in 1926 when Fianna Fáil was founded. Constance Markievicz was a founding member of that party but, her health broken by years of imprisonment, she died in 1927 after two appendix operations. In 1930 the Fianna got the use of the Hardwicke Hall in Dublin (owned by the family of Joseph Plunkett and site of Thomas MacDonagh's Theatre of Ireland from 1914 to 1916) as a headquarters as George Plunkett was nominated by the IRA as Chief Scout. This was a nominal position; the organisation was run by the HQ staff. At this time, the Fianna expanded in proportion to the rest of the Republican Movement. In 1933 Frank Ryan became Adjutant General for eight months. The 1934 HQ report said that there were 104 sluaithe in operation. Eight hundred people paraded under the Fianna flag at Bodenstown that year, and Diarmuid MacGiolla Phadraig became Adjutant General.

The Free State government brought in new legislation in 1931 to counter the popularity of resurgent republicanism. Now the Fianna, the IRA and Cumann na mBan were all classified as illegal organisations. Many arrests followed, and these organisations had to go underground. When the Fianna Fáil government was elected to power in March 1932, this legislation was revoked, most of the prisoners were freed and many young republicans switched allegiance to Fianna Fáil. In 1934, the Fianna Fáil government expanded the Free State CID, the new ranks were filled largely by enticing members of the IRA's Dublin Brigade to join the Special Branch of An Garda Síochána. Former volunteers were sworn in as Gardaí detective officers and issued handguns, ammunition, badges and whistles. They were under the control of Ned Broy of the CID in a group known as the "Broy Harriers", a term first used in the Seanad by Senator Brian O'Rourke during the discussion on the Garda Síochána estimates on 16 August 1933.

The 1936 Fianna Convention reported that there were 18 sluaithe in the organisation. The IRA, Cumann na mBan and the Fianna were once again outlawed that June. In 1938 an advisory body of prominent republicans was set up to help reorganise the Fianna; included were George Plunkett, Brian O'Higgins, Mary MacSwiney and Madge Daly. The following year, Joe Atkinson of Belfast was appointed as a national organiser and cycled through the country contacting failed Fianna sluaithe and creating new ones. Later that year he was appointed Adjutant General and Liam Nolan of Kerry became National Organiser. George Plunkett resigned as Chief Scout for health reasons. In 1940, 150 Fianna marched in Dublin on the eve of the executions of two republicans responsible for a fatal bombing in Coventry, Barnes and McCormack in Britain. Fianna in Dublin were under the control of Jack Rowan, Kevin Hudson and Mattie O'Neill. Four sluaithe were reported active in Dublin and although the use of Hardwicke Hall was lost, newly released internees helped in the re-organization, including Wattie Bell, Noel and Des Goulding, Paddy Dillon and Mattie Carey.

By 1943, owing to arrests, internment and emigration, the Fianna in Dublin was reduced to one sluagh, run by Peadar Timmins. Dick Bell was released from internment in 1945 and led the Fianna in Dublin, with Con Dillon as his adjutant and Mattie O'Neill as quartermaster. They set up a Fianna GHQ. By 1947 Dublin had a new O/C, Des Carron, with Wattie Bell as his adjutant. The first annual camp of the new group was held in 1947 and later that year Carron and Bell cycled to Munster, organising Fianna sluaithe at Clonmel and Tralee. The following year the first Ard Fheis since 1940 was held in Dublin. Dublin reported having one sluagh, which met at 9 Parnell Square.

== Fianna organisation after 1950 ==
When World War II broke out, the old IRA and old Fianna organisations marched as a body to Griffith Barracks in Dublin and joined the Irish Army as a battalion (the 26th Battalion). When on parade, this battalion flew the Fianna and Óglaigh na h-Éireann flags. When the war was over these bodies stayed intact and had premises at Parnell Square. They marched in Bodenstown with Fianna Fáil and attended all the usual commemorations organised by the government. In 1953, the Old Fianna organisation issued an invitation to Ned Kelly (Chief Scout) to meet with them. The Old Fianna reportedly offered their Fianna flag to the then-current Fianna. However, when Kelly heard that the flag would be handed over in a military barracks in an official ceremony, that was unacceptable, and the parley proved fruitless. The old Fianna petered out in the late 1950s.

In 1951 the Ard Fheis in Dublin reported that 9 sluaithe were in existence. 500 Fianna were present at the Bodenstown commemoration and Dick Bell was re-elected as Chief Scout. He did not seek re-election at the 1952 Ard Fheis and Tomas MacCurtain was nominated as a nominal Chief Scout, succeeded by Ned Kelly of Long Lane, Dorset Street, Dublin in 1953. Ned Kelly soon he gathered around him a cadre of young leaders and had four sluaithe running in the Dublin area. These were at North City, Drimnagh/Crumlin, Dundrum and Finglas. He had as his adjutant Brian McConnell from Swilly Road in Cabra. His QM was Annrai MacGloin from Bohernabreena.

In 1954/55 a split occurred in the republican movement. Activists led by Joe Christle became disenchanted with the leadership. They were looking for armed action in Northern Ireland, but were restrained by the Army Council. This breakaway group aligned with Saor Uladh. They set up a youth group who also called themselves Fianna Éireann with Gearoid O'Kelly as Chief Scout; he previously had a Fianna sluagh in Newbridge, but was now living in Ballyboden. This Fianna had one sluagh, at Inchicore, with members mainly from the Drimnagh and Crumlin area. A serious clash occurred between the two groups later in 1959 over the sale of the Easter Lily, commemorating the republican dead.

Ned Kelly was dismissed from the republican movement in 1955 and replaced as Chief Scout by George Darle from Drumcondra, a nominee of the IRA who had some Catholic Boy Scouts experience. He brought new blood into the organisation, including Frank Lee and Terry Kiely. They set about reorganising the Fianna and soon new sluaithe were being formed in Navan, Dundalk, Drogheda and Sligo.

The Border Campaign by the IRA, which began in December 1956, led to the Fianna losing many of its members, especially in Dublin. In January 1957, 38 IRA recruits were surrounded and arrested in a house used for training in Glencree, Co Wicklow. At least 12 of these had been members of the Dublin Battalion of the Fianna.

=== Uniform changes ca. 1958 ===
The uniform in 1958 was basically the same as when Fianna was founded in 1909: a green blouse with two rows of brass buttons, an orange neckerchief, slouch hat, black shorts and a white lanyard with a whistle. Officers wore riding breeches and a military jacket, slouch hat and a Sam Browne belt. The uniform was now changed to resemble an American Boy Scout uniform: a green shirt with two pockets and a military-style side hat. Eventually, the side hats were replaced by a green beret, and the long trousers for officers were replaced by black shorts or breeches.

=== Jubilee Camp 1959 ===
A committee was sent up by GHQ in 1958 to commemorate the 50th anniversary of the Fianna's founding. Chief Scout Jimmy Cruise headed this body and it was decided to hold a camp in central Ireland for all Fianna sluaithe. Permission was given by the Patrician Brothers, Ballyfin, County Laois, to use their grounds for this purpose in August 1959. These were years when money was scarce and travelling made difficult. Consequently, only about 100 Fianna members attended the camp. Each sluagh catered for itself and there were joint activities organised. The Special Branch of the Garda Síochána was busy while the camp was in progress, visiting the homes of Fianna members, especially the young Scouts, telling the parents that the boys were on an IRA training camp. Quite a few members were lost this way. In 1959, Fianna was given the privilege of having its colour party lead the annual pilgrimage to the grave of Wolfe Tone at Bodenstown. A report to the Ard Fheis in 1963 showed that, as well as the sluaithe mentioned above, there were now new units in Roscrea, Nenagh, and Ballyfermot/Chapelizod. A new department had been set up which catered for friends of the Fianna who were either too old to join, or were not in a position to do so. This was known as the dept. of Associated Members. This new section was run by the Adjutant General.

=== Junior members ===
Fianna had always catered for boys between the ages of eleven years and sixteen years. About 1959, a new idea was put in place to cater to younger boys. With the assistance of some Cumann na mBan members, boys as young as eight years were allowed into the ranks of the Fianna. They wore a plain green sweater and yellow neckerchief. This venture was a success and most sluaithe (branches) followed suit.

=== New Fianna handbook ===
A committee was set up circa 1963 to gather funds to produce a new Fianna handbook. All of the committee were members of the GHQ, and included Liam MacAnUltaigh, Deasún Ó Briain, Brian Mulvanney, Uinsionn O'Cathain and Tony Shannon. Funds and advertisers were procured and a new handbook appeared ca. 1965. This was the third edition of the handbook, the others having been printed in 1913 and 1924.

=== Arrest of Fianna officers ===
Around November 1963 action was taken against Gearóid O'Kelly who was allegedly collecting money in pubs for "Republican Prisoners' Dependents". On a Saturday night in November 1963 he was stopped near his home at Ballyboden Road, Rathfarnham by a party of armed men. They bundled him into a field and "tarred and feathered" him. About eleven senior officers were arrested by the Special Branch the following Monday morning and brought to the Bridewell.

After a few hours, O'Kelly was brought in to try to identify those who may have assaulted him. The officers were all brought into one room and O'Kelly viewed them through a glass panel from an adjoining room. No one was detained, and most had alibis, as they were at an Ard Coiste meeting at Gardiner Place at the time of the assault and had been seen entering and leaving the building by the Special Branch men who constantly watched that premises. O'Kelly had also fallen out with his 'Fianna' and two of his associates (Weldon and Phelan), spent six months in prison for assaulting him. He gave up his activities at this stage.

=== Activities ===
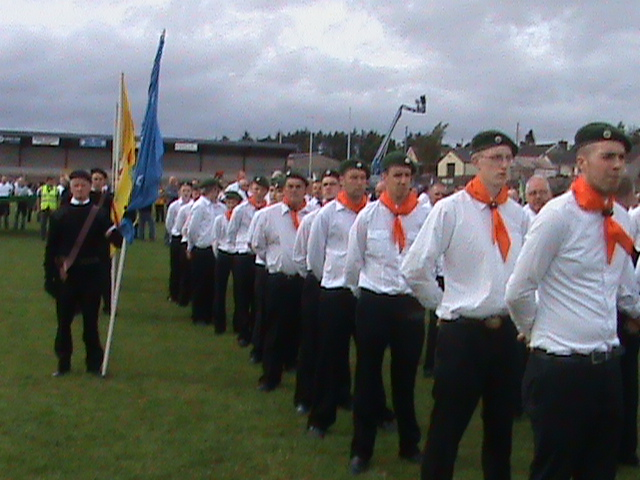
A Fianna Éireann/Ógra Shinn Féin colour party at Galbally, Tyrone 2009

The 1950s and 1960s were very active years for Fianna members. A Sluagh usually held one meeting per week, where all met on parade in full uniform. All the usual Scouting test work was undertaken, games played and instructions given regarding hikes or camps on the following weekend. Weather never held the Scouts back from the 'great outdoors', and Fianna members could be encountered in all weathers, especially in the Dublin/Wicklow mountains. This was a time when much military surplus clothing and camping equipment was coming onto the market following the end of the Korean War. One Sluagh, Finglas, had snow tents previously used by the British Army, suitable for camping out in all types of weather.

Another favourite weekend pastime was 'shacking'. Throughout the mountains were numerous old deserted houses (shacks), and at weekends the Fianna would use them for shelter. One favourite one was called 'Thunders' in Glencree. Another was in the Glen of the Downs, near the village of Delgany, where there was a Fianna Sluagh. All-night hikes were a favourite with the officers. The last bus out of town to Rathfarnham, Enniskerry or Bohernabreena would be taken, and then the group would march all night across the hills, to where they would pick up the first bus back to the city again. Youth-hosteling was also undertaken, popular with the younger Scouts. Hostels such as Glencree, Baltyboys and Knockree were all within striking distance of the buses from Dublin. Many Dublin Sluagh organised Whit weekend camps and annual week long camps. During the early 1960s national camps were held at Castledermot (County Carlow) and another at Glencolumbkille (County Donegal).

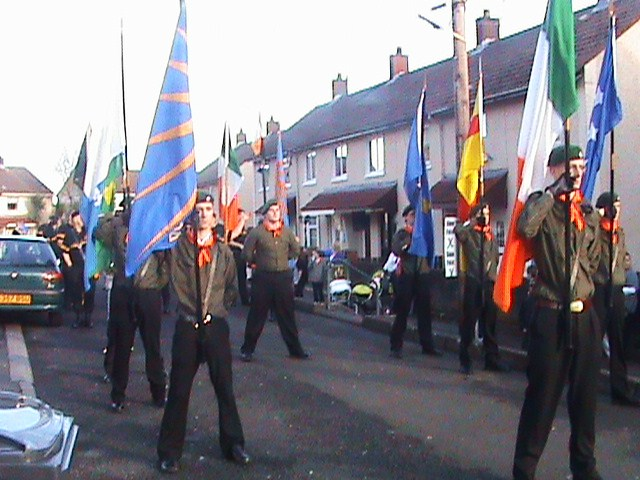
A Fianna Éireann/Ógra Shinn Féin colour party in Belfast 2010

Republican commemorations were constantly being held and the Fianna was obliged to turn out in full to them. And during this time high ranking Inchicore republican John McGrath brought in several new members to the Fianna. The annual Easter Commemoration was usually the first on the calendar. The parade would line up at St. Stephens Green and march all the way to Glasnevin Cemetery. On the same day, a parade was usually held in Blackrock or Deans Grange Cemetery as well. The Wolf Tone Commemoration was next in line, usually on the last Sunday in June. This was usually a great day out. Trains would come from Dublin, Cork and Kerry for the occasion, and buses from all parts of the country: it was a festive occasion. In November there was held the Manchester Martyrs parade and concert, and in December the Fianna always hosted the Four Martyrs Concert in Dublin. In between all of these occasions, there were many times when the Fianna was invited to provide colour-parties and contingents in various parts of the country to commemorate fallen republican soldiers.

Many republican demonstrations were held in these years to protest against internment and coercion. The Fianna always played its part on these occasions and was highly visible on the streets when needed. A major source of income always came from the sale of the Easter Lily at Eastertime. Many times the boxes and contents were confiscated by the Garda, as the Fianna never applied for permits.

A plaque in memory of Fian John Dempsey – the last member of the organisation to have been killed on active service

=== After 1969 ===
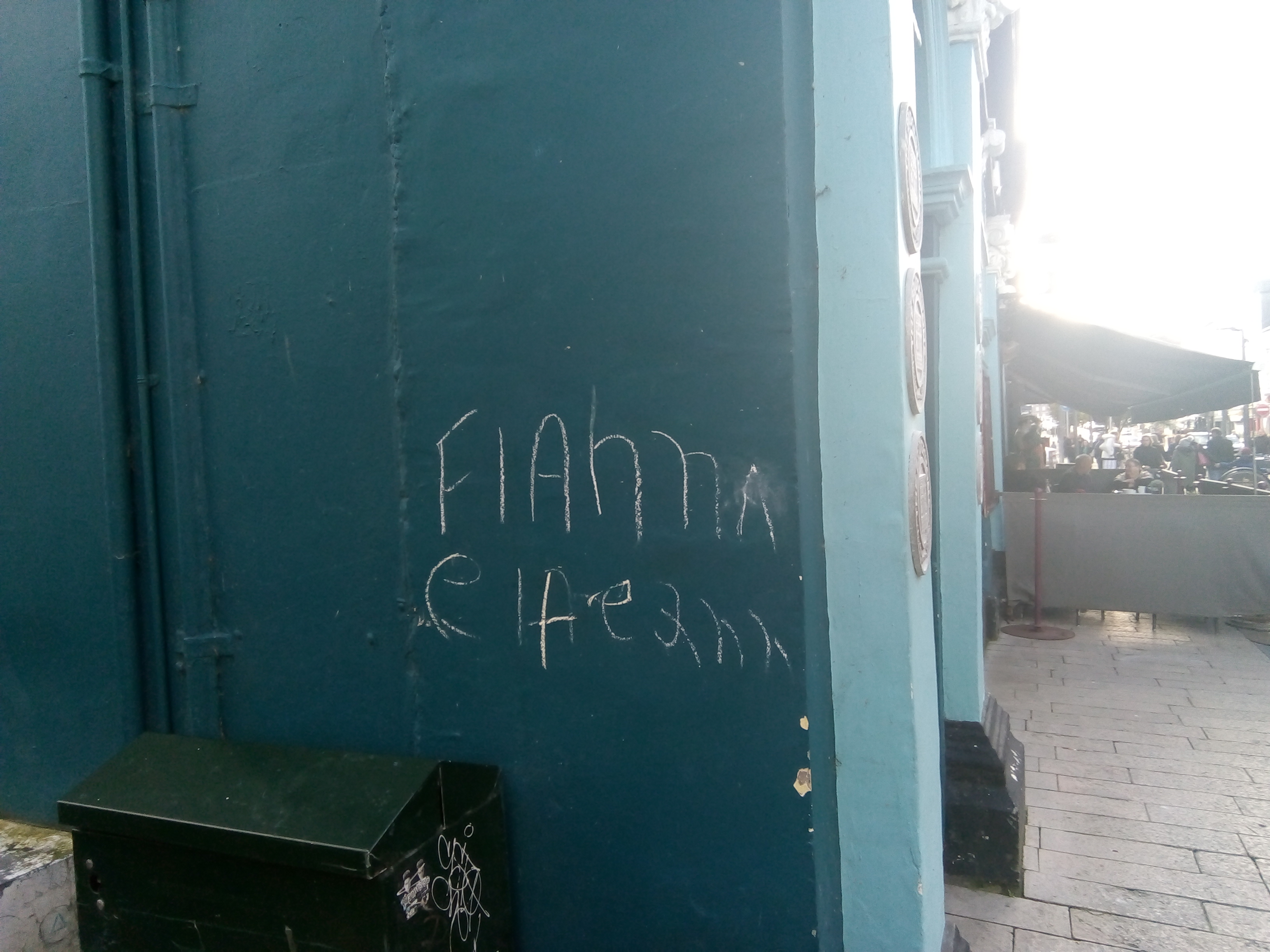
Pro-Fianna Éireann graffito in County Waterford

Similarly to the wider republican movement, the Fianna experienced a number of splits after the outbreak of the Troubles. In 1969 two rival groups claimed the title of the Fianna Éireann; one composed of members under the control and influence of the Official movement who wanted to end the Sinn Féin abstentionist policy, and the other aligned to the re-organized Provisional Sinn Féin and IRA movement who supported a continuation of the traditional policy.

The Fianna group aligned with the Officials was dissolved in 1976 by the Official Army Council and replaced by the Irish Democratic Youth Movement after a significant number of Fianna volunteers left, taking with them a significant quantity of arms, in the 1974 OIRA-INLA split.

In 1986 there was a further split within (Provisional) Sinn Féin and the IRA due to the dropping of Sinn Féin's abstentionist policy. After this split the Fianna withdrew its support from the Provisional movement, citing republican principles. It now supports Republican Sinn Féin and the Continuity IRA. Vice News reported that in early 2015 the group had about 30 members.

According to a 2020 study, four factors are associated with Fianna membership: "First, working-class background, with its related deprivation and social problems (such as criminality and drug addiction); second, the importance of family links and social networks; third, social media as an introduction to republicanism; and, fourth, fascination with Irish history."

In May 2025, Fianna na hEireann was on the UK Government List of proscribed groups linked to Northern Ireland related terrorism.

== Leaders ==
- Eamon Martin (ca. 1917–1922)
- Pádraig Ó Riain, July 1915 (Ó Riain fell out of favour after the Rising; Bureau of Military History Statement from Ó Riain's sister, ca. 1953)
- Constance Markievicz (ca. 1923)
- Liam Langley (Langlaoich) (ca. 1929)
- Frank Ryan (ca. 1932)
- George Plunkett (ca. 1933)
- Tomás Óg Mac Curtain, Cork. (c.1948–50)
- Dick Bell, Dublin. (ca. 1950–52)
- Ned Kelly, Dublin (1952–55)
- George Darle, Dublin (1955–57)
- Pat Madden, Cork (1958)
- Jimmy Cruise, Dublin (1958–60)
- Brian Murphy, Dublin (1960–62)
- Uinsionn Ó Cathain (1962–1964)
- Seán Ó Cionnaith (temporary Chief Scout in late 1964)
- Liam Mac an Ultaigh (1965–19??)

== See also ==
- Ógra Shinn Féin
- Urz Skaouted Bleimor
- Urdd Gobaith Cymru
