= Magazine Fort =

Bastion fort and magazine in Dublin, Ireland

- Dún na hArmlainne
- Near Phoenix Park, Dublin in Ireland
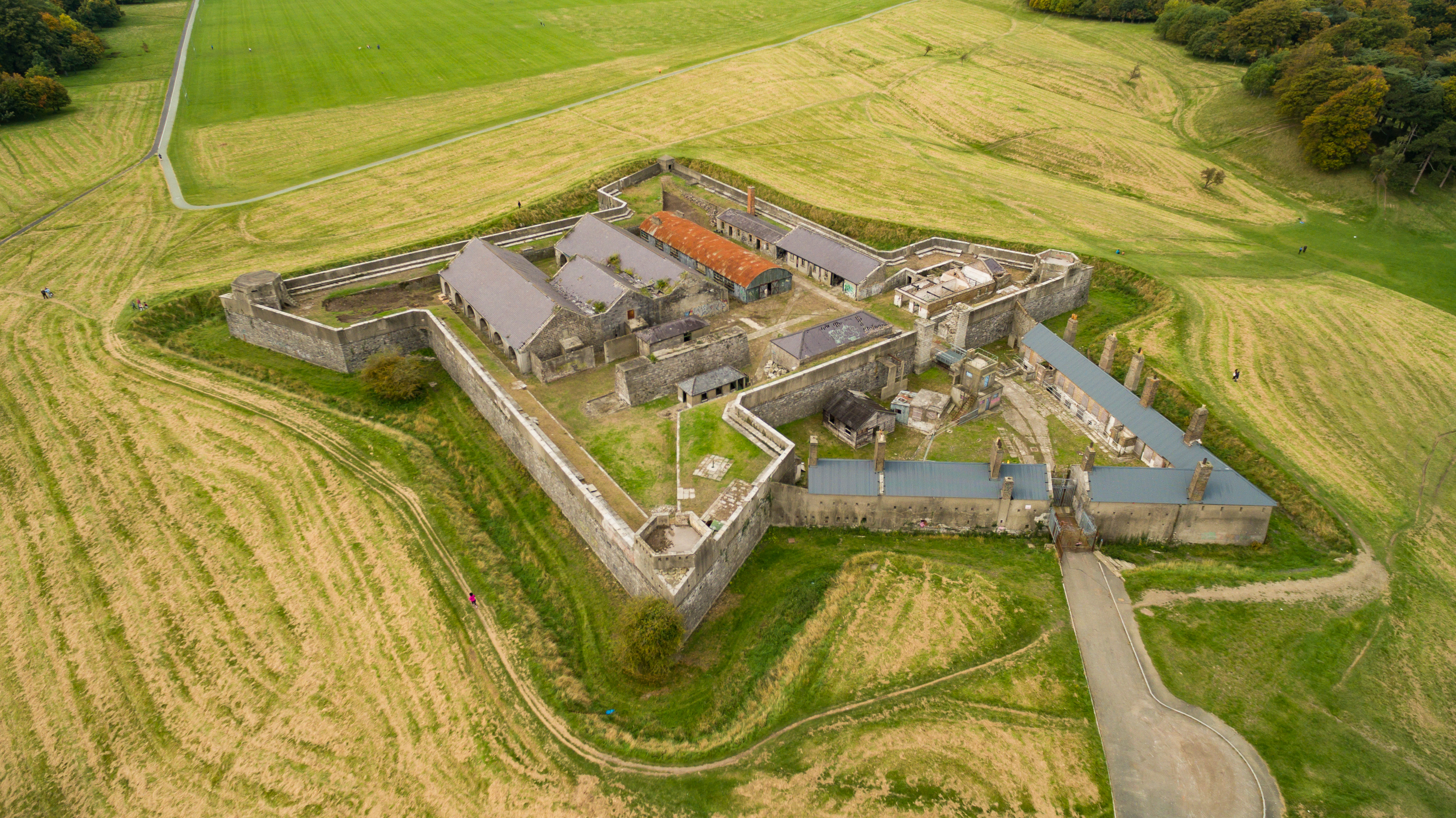
- Aerial (drone) image of Magazine Fort

Site information
- Type: Bastion fort and magazine
- Owner: Office of Public Works
- Open to the public: Yes
- Condition: Partially restored

Location
- Location within Ireland
- Coordinates: 53.3486°N 6.3163°W

Site history
- Built: 1735
- Built by: John Corneille (military engineer)
- In use: 1980s (demilitarisation)
- Events: Easter Rising (1916), Christmas Raid (1939)

Garrison information
- Occupants: British Armed Forces, Irish Defence Forces

The Magazine Fort is a bastion fort and magazine located within the Phoenix Park, in Dublin, Ireland. Built in 1735, it was occupied by British Armed Forces until 1922 when it was turned over to the Irish Defence Forces after the Anglo-Irish Treaty. The Irish Army continued to operate the site as an ammunition store through the mid-20th century. It was fully demilitarised by the 1980s. The fort is now managed by the Office of Public Works. As of 2015, it was in a derelict state and not open to the public, however, some repairs were undertaken and the site was opened for pre-booked guided tours from 2016.

== History ==
=== Background ===
In the 1530s, during the Dissolution of the Monasteries, lands within what is now the Phoenix Park were confiscated from the Knights Hospitaller. These lands were later leased to Sir Edward Fisher. By 1611, Fisher had built a house known as "Phoenix Lodge" on St Thomas' Hill. By the mid-17th century, Fisher's house and lands were returned to the state, and the house used as the seat of the Lord Deputy of Ireland.

Although Thomas Burgh (1670–1730) had engineered a larger earthwork star fort quite close by in 1710, by the 1730s, the then Lord Lieutenant, Lionel Sackville (1688–1765) directed that a new gunpowder store be built at St Thomas' Hill on the site of the house. Phoenix Lodge was therefore demolished in 1734, and construction on the magazine fort commenced in 1735 to designs by engineer John Corneille. At the time the city was relatively poor, prompting the satirist Jonathan Swift to publish a verse on the seeming futility of the fortification:

Now's here's a proof of Irish sense/Here Irish wit is seen / When nothing's left that's worth defence/We build a Magazine

— Jonathan Swift, c.1737 (attrib)

=== Construction ===
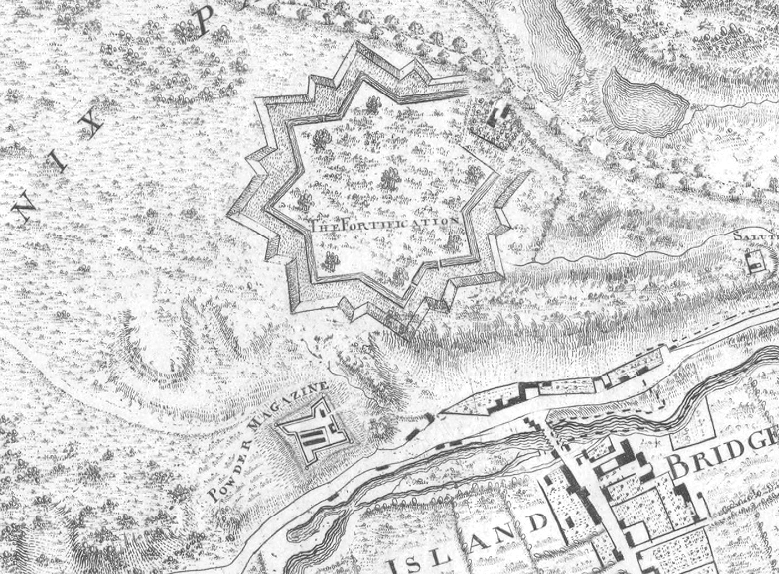
Extract from 1757 map, showing Burgh's earthwork fort (demolished 1837) and Corneille's powder magazine

Unlike de Burgh's nearby star fort, which was primarily earthwork and demolished in the 1830s, Corneille's bastion fort was built of brick and limestone.

The main body of the fort is approximately 2 acres in area and is surrounded by a dry moat. Each corner is defended by a demi-bastion (with embrasures), and the walls are approximately 1.5 metres (5 ft) thick. The large barrel-vaulted brick magazine chambers themselves are approximately 270 square metres (2,900 sq ft) in size and located to the northwest of the main enclosure. These were serviced by overhead cranes and gantries – for moving powder kegs. A later triangular barracks and accommodation block was added on the south-side in 1801, to designs by Francis Johnston. Other sheds and outbuildings were added in the 20th century.

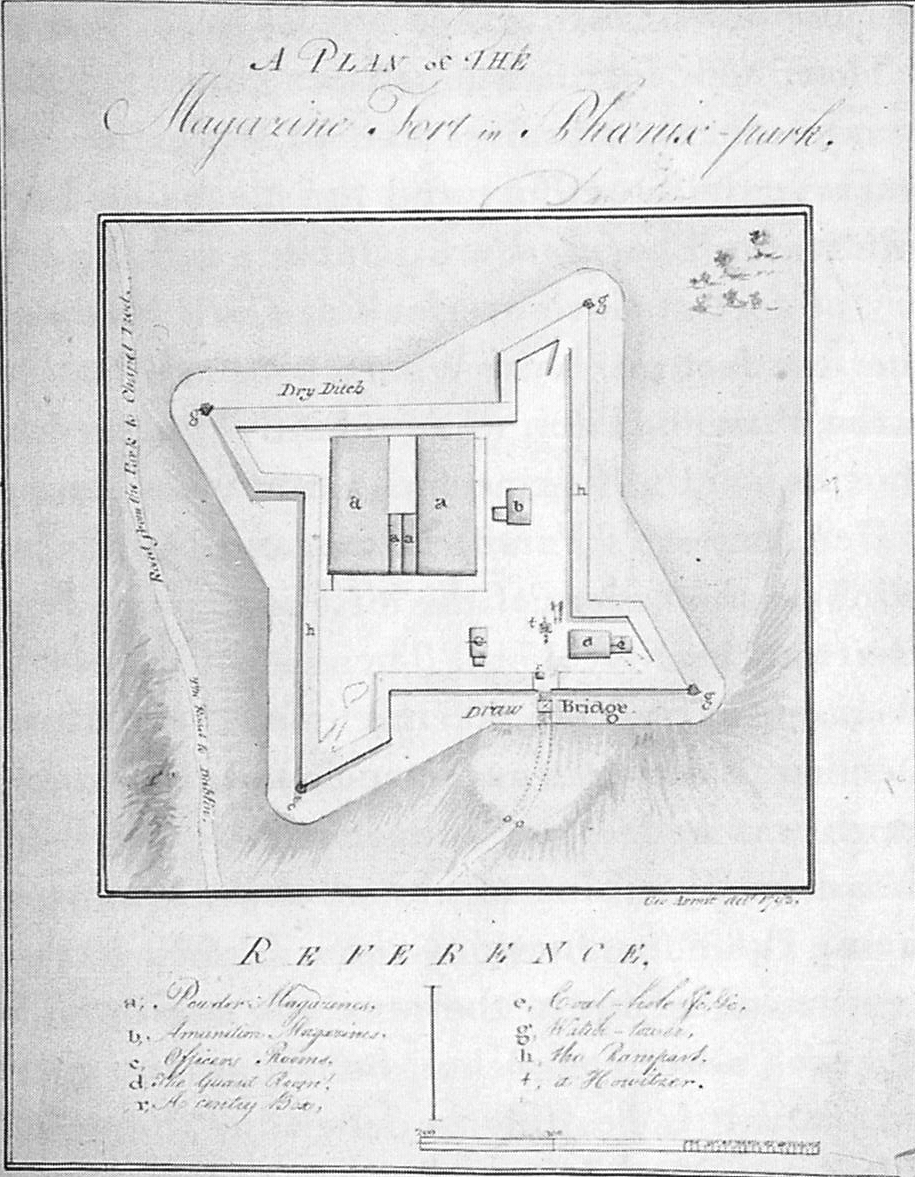
1793 plan of the fort referencing "a Howitzer" defending the gate

=== Defences ===
A 1793 survey indicates that a large artillery piece was used to defend the main gateway. By the 1890s, there were ten 12-pounder guns mounted at the fort. In the early 20th century, the corner demi-bastions were converted to include concrete pillbox machine-gun posts.

=== Raids ===
In use by British and Irish forces for 250 years, the fort was subject to two notable raids in the 20th century. The first occurred on 24 April 1916, during the Easter Rising, when predominantly young members of Fianna Éireann raided the fort for arms and set explosives to blow it up, however, "after setting fires to blow up the magazine’s ordinance; but the fuses burned out before reaching the ammunition and little damage was caused."

Some of the first shots of the Easter Rising were believed to have been fired during this raid when an unarmed member of the garrison household and an armed sentry were shot. The latter was seriously injured but apparently survived; the former died nine hours later. These marked the first shootings of the Easter Rising. (Note: While contemporary accounts (e.g. Irish Times, 29 April 1916) suggested the garrison commander's adolescent son (Gerald Playfair, aged 14) was shot dead by an IRA volunteer (Garry Holohan), later investigations (i.e. Duffy, History Ireland, 2013) suggest that it was an elder son (George Alexander "Alec" Playfair, aged 23) who was killed.)

The second raid occurred on 23 December 1939 when, during the so-called "Christmas Raid", members of the Irish Republican Army raided the magazine for weapons and more than one million rounds of ammunition. Most of the stolen equipment was recovered over the following weeks.

== Today ==
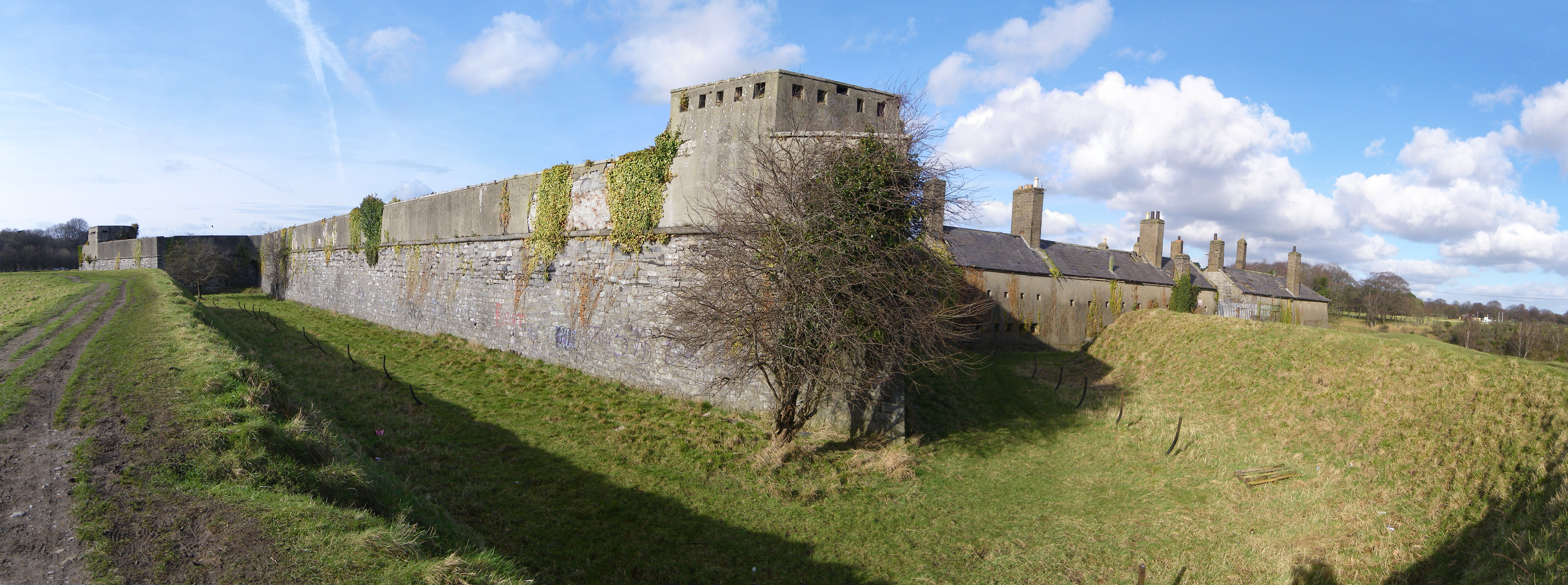
Magazine fort demi-bastion and moat. Some 18th-century walls were rendered with concrete in the early 20th century

As with other military installations within Dublin, following the Anglo-Irish Treaty, the Irish defence forces took possession of the fort from British armed forces. The Irish Army continued to operate the facility, including time as an ammunition store, until 1988, when it was handed over to the Office of Public Works (OPW).

Though some repair and maintenance works had previously been carried out by the OPW, as of 2015, the site was in a somewhat derelict state. Some repairs were undertaken in 2016 to allow for the site to be partially opened to the public - initially as part of 1916 Rising centenary events.

As of 2019, some conservation works were on-going within the fort and the OPW operated limited guided tours of the site, with tours departing the Phoenix Park visitor centre at set times. Additional works were undertaken in 2023. Work to stabilise sections of perimeter walling and the re-instatement of the Duke of Dorset's Gate facilitated the reopening of the fort to the public in July 2026.

== See also ==
- Dublin gunpowder explosion – a 16th-century disaster arising from gunpowder storage/transport within the city proper
- Elizabeth Fort – a similarly sized star-plan fort in Cork city
