= Swedish neutrality =

Swedish foreign policy from the 19th century to the early 21st century

Sweden had a policy of neutrality in armed conflicts from the early 19th century, until 2009, when it entered into various mutual defence treaties with the European Union (EU), and other Nordic countries. The policy originated largely as a result of Sweden's involvement in the Napoleonic Wars, during which over a third of the country's territory was lost in the Finnish War (1808–1809), including the traumatic loss of Finland to Russia, which it remained part of until Finland gained independence in 1917. Resentment towards the Swedish king Gustav IV Adolf, who had consistently pursued an anti-Napoleonic policy and thereby caused the war, precipitated a coup d'état known as the Coup of 1809. The new regime deposed the king and introduced the Instrument of Government (1809), later formulating a new foreign policy that became known as The Policy of 1812.

Since the Napoleonic Wars, Sweden has not initiated any direct armed conflict. However, Sweden's military and government have been involved in major peacekeeping actions and other military support functions around the world. The accession to the European Union in 1995 meant that neutrality as a principle was abolished. Sweden remained a non-aligned country in regard to foreign and security policy until joining the North Atlantic Treaty Organization (NATO) in 2024.

Swedish neutrality during World War II has been much debated in the years since. Despite the British naval blockade of Nazi Germany, and the official posturing of the Swedish government, Sweden exported iron ore to supply Nazi Germany's war industry via the Norwegian port of Narvik. The German war industries' dependence on Swedish iron ore shipments was the primary reason for the United Kingdom and its allies to launch Operation Wilfred and the Norwegian Campaign in early April 1940. By early June 1940, the Norwegian Campaign stood as a failure for the Allies, and by securing access to Norwegian ports by force, the Nazis were able to obtain the Swedish iron ore it needed for war production, even with the British naval blockade still in place. Sweden also supplied the Nazi German war industry with steel and machined parts throughout the war and provided transportation for armed German reinforcement troops, the 163rd Infantry Division/Division Engelbrecht commanded by General Erwin Engelbrecht, and military equipment through Swedish territory by train from Norway to the eastern front in Finland.

Sweden maintained its policy of neutrality after World War II, despite substantial cooperation with the West. Former Prime Minister of Sweden Carl Bildt has noted that this policy was in response to fears that if Sweden were to join NATO the Soviet Union might respond by invading Finland, with which Sweden retained close relations.

Sweden's policy of neutrality came to an end with the 2022 Russian invasion of Ukraine. On 18 May 2022, the country alongside Finland submitted an application to join NATO, and on 7 March 2024, Sweden became the 32nd member of the alliance.

== The Policy of 1812 ==
The new foreign policy, often called The Policy of 1812, was directed by Jean Baptiste Bernadotte, the recently elected Crown Prince, who had served as Regent since 1811. The policy of 1812 was in sharp contrast to Sweden's previous foreign policy, during which Sweden had been involved in many conflicts, especially with its arch enemy, Russia. However, in 1812, with Napoleon starting a campaign against Russia and Emperor Alexander, the Emperor was in need of allies, and so met with the Swedish Crown Prince in Åbo. At the meeting it was agreed that Sweden would accept that Finland was part of Russia in exchange for the Tsar's help in pressuring Denmark to cede Norway to Sweden.

Swedish troops led by Bernadotte took part in the Napoleonic Wars in 1813 and 1814, wherein the Crown Prince authored the Allied Campaign Plan, known as the Trachenberg Plan, and commanded the Allied Army of the North. Bernadotte's army fought against the French in the fall of 1813 and defeated them at the Battle of Grossbeeren, Battle of Dennewitz and played a key role in the mammoth Battle of Leipzig. Bernadotte then led an invasion of Denmark. Sweden forced Denmark to hand over Norway by the Treaty of Kiel. This was recognised by the Allied powers at the Congress of Vienna. Since this time Sweden has not taken part in armed warfare (with the exception of peacekeeping).

== Schleswig Question ==
During the First War of Schleswig, from 1848 to 1851, Swedish troops were located in Jutland as support for Denmark against Prussian-supported rebels; the Swedish regular troops, however, never experienced any combat. Hundreds of Norwegian and Swedish volunteers joined and fought in the Danish army.

After 40 years of successful trust-building with Russia, Sweden took no serious policy risks in the Crimean War, despite the possibility of a revision of the harsh peace of 1809. Although Sweden concluded an alliance with Britain and France, (November 25, 1855), the country did not engage in warfare.

At the Second war of Schleswig, the Riksdag of the Estates refused to fulfill King Charles XV's promises of military support; and Sweden observed a strict neutrality, which would prove to be advantageous. Prussia would soon forge and dominate Imperial Germany, an unmatchable foe for Sweden—whose relative strength had diminished strikingly since its zenith during the Thirty Years' War.

== World War I ==
Prussia's dominance had made the following forty years peaceful in the Baltic region, and by the outbreak of World War I, neutrality seemed a natural state to many Swedes. Although feelings of cultural and scientific kinship with the German Empire were strong in Sweden, mercantile and personal ties with Britain and France were strong as well. Opinion was split between Conservatives, with sympathies for Germany, and Liberals, with more mixed sympathies. Organized but politically less influential were the Social Democrats, antimilitarists and opposed to the war. The neutralist stance was reinforced when Denmark and Norway remained neutral. Voices for neutrality dominated the public debate, but Queen Victoria and some conservatives were strong advocates for entrance in the war on the German side, and the government's policy had a clear pro-German bias. From 1911 until 1916, Swedish volunteers were hired by the Persian government to help modernize their army in order to crush local insurgencies, but British and Russian pressure forced Sweden to recall its soldiers.

In 1916, the pro-German policy was abandoned, having resulted in famine, rebellious opinions, and no tangible advantages. Once again, the conviction that strict neutrality was most suitable for Sweden dominated Swedish society. A new, less German-minded Conservative cabinet was appointed, and to calm the social unrest, democratic reforms were promptly initiated that cemented Sweden's neutralist policy and would soon lead to the political hegemony of Social Democrats lasting up to the 21st century.

== Åland Islands ==
The politician who stood as the biggest thorn in the side of the government was the Swedish Foreign Minister, Rickard Sandler (1932–1936 and 1936–1939). Sandler strongly opposed the government's policy of strict neutrality, feeling it necessary that the government relax its stringent policy. Sandler expressed a desire to defend Åland from either German or Soviet control, by mining the area around the islands in conjunction with the Finnish government.

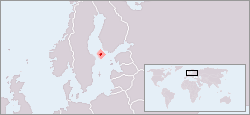
The location of Åland in the Baltic Sea

The Åland Islands are of extreme strategic importance in the Baltic. Lying at the base of the Gulf of Bothnia, the Åland Islands are situated alongside all the sea traffic lanes that come in and out of the Gulf, and are within range of Sweden, Finland and the Baltic states to the east.

Prior to 1809, the Åland Islands were part of Sweden, who was forced to give them up, along with the mainland area of Finland, in the Treaty of Fredrikshamn on September 17, 1809, to Russia. Out of the ceded areas, including the Åland islands, Russia formed the Grand Duchy of Finland. With the Treaty of Paris of April 18, 1856, at the conclusion of the Crimean War, Russia was required to stop the construction of any new fortifications on the islands, which Russia obeyed, despite unsuccessfully attempting to change the status of the islands in 1908.

In 1914, however, the Russian government turned the islands into a submarine base for the use of British and Russian submarines during the First World War. In December 1917, the Finnish government proclaimed that Finland was a sovereign state and a dispute over whether the islands belonged to Sweden or Finland ensued. In 1921, again despite the fact that almost 100 percent of the islands' population was Swedish—and that they expressed a desire of being incorporated into Sweden—the League of Nations decided that the Åland Islands should remain a part of Finland.

Despite Sweden's grievances over failing to gain control of the islands in 1921, all difficulties between Sweden and Finland were resolved by the mid-1930s. The fear of the Åland islands falling under German or Soviet influence was very real, and that is why Sandler proposed defending the status of the islands.

However, the Swedish government opposed Sandler's proposal, in that it was felt that this would set a precedent for further moves—moves that might provoke an invasion from either Germany, the Soviet Union or both. When a new coalition was formed to represent Sweden's policy of neutrality, in light of the Winter War, Sandler was dropped from the new lineup of ministers. It was initially believed that the Swedish government had dropped Sandler due to his outspoken comments on the government's policies, and the German press' allegations that Sandler was pro-British; however, in reality it was Sandler who requested permission to retire from the Swedish cabinet, because the government did not represent Sandler's anti-neutral views.

== Armed neutrality ==
The 1930s marked a new period when Sweden's long-standing policy of neutrality was severely tested on numerous occasions, most of which came from a strongly rejuvenated nationalistic Germany. Since the founding of the League of Nations in 1919 and up to the year 1935, Sweden had been a strong supporter of the League, and most of Sweden's energy on the international stage had been put into its preservation.

As the collective security system of the League of Nations started to crack with the Abyssinia crisis, and the approach of World War II, Sweden could look back on 120 years of successful neutralist politics – with one singular exception: the volunteer force stationed on Funen to assist the Danes during the First Schleswig War. Sweden now pursued a policy of forging a bloc of neutralist countries in Northern Europe. Belgium, the Netherlands, Denmark, Norway, Finland and the Baltic States were all members of this club of neutral states. Of them, only Sweden would be fortunate enough to remain unattacked during World War II.

Opposition to this new policy of armed neutrality was weak in that all major parties, such as the Conservatives, Agrarians and Liberal People's Party, supported the government's position. On a regular basis, beginning in 1936, the Swedish government requested increases in its defence budget to strengthen its military preparedness as the international situation continued to worsen. The actual military budget from 1936 to 1939 increased many times over. In 1936, military spending was $37,000,000; 1937, $50,000,000; 1938, $58,575,000; and in 1939 it was at $322,325,000. After the war began, military spending peaked in 1942 at $527,575,000 in one year alone. With the increased need of an expanded military, Swedish industry was required to not only supply the increased demand for domestic products, exacerbated by the German blockade of the North Sea, but also had to meet an increased demand in military armaments for the Swedish government. Before the war, production of armaments did not exceed more than tens of millions of Swedish kronor, but during the war, production exceeded the cost of one billion Swedish kronor ($240,000,000).

=== Significance of the neutrality policy ===
The fate of the Swedish nation largely rested upon the outcomes of distant battles and the policies of distant governments—events outside the control of Swedish politicians and diplomats. Had certain battles or policies during the war been different, Sweden's ability to attain a successful policy of neutrality might very well not have succeeded. Finland was invaded by the Soviet Union in the Winter War, fought from December 1939–March 1940. In April 1940, Germany invaded Norway in the Norwegian campaign and occupied Denmark. The British and French sent reinforcements to the Norwegians, but the Battle of France caused a reassessment in priorities, and Norway was abandoned to the Germans. Sweden's position was tenuous, with German-occupied territory all around it. Whether from fear of a German invasion if they did not comply with German desires for iron or genuine sympathy, Sweden under Prime Minister Hansson was deferential to the Nazi government. After Germany invaded the USSR in 1941 with Operation Barbarossa, Finland joined in with the Continuation War against the USSR. Sweden was now entirely surrounded by Nazi allies, but the German war machine would also be distracted for the remainder of the war with their struggle with the Red Army. If there were ever serious plans for a Nazi invasion of Sweden, they were put indefinitely on hold due to the more pressing struggle with the Soviets. Sweden would avoid the devastating losses and destruction that so much of Europe suffered during World War II, although how much was due to luck and how much was due to their diplomatic stance may never be clear.

One beneficial consequence of Sweden's neutrality was that Sweden was able to act as a refuge to people from occupied lands. Approximately 70,000 Finnish children were evacuated and placed with families in Sweden. There were also refugees from the Baltic nations and the other Scandinavian countries. Nearly all of Denmark's Jewish population was able to escape to Sweden on fishing boats in a coordinated effort by the Danish people and the Swedes who gave them shelter on the other side. Sweden's neutral stance allowed Swedish diplomats access to Germany, allowing for espionage which benefited the Swedish intelligence as well as the Allies. The Swedish diplomats Raoul Wallenberg and Count Folke Bernadotte saved over 10,000 European Jews from the concentration camps, although they did this largely as individuals rather than being directed to do so as part of an official Swedish policy.

== Scandinavian defence union ==
A Scandinavian defence union that would have included Sweden, Norway and Denmark was considered among the three countries after World War II. They would remain separate sovereign countries but act as a single bloc in foreign policy and security issues. The proposed union was discussed by a joint Scandinavian committee during the winter of 1948–1949, but in the end the Cold War tension between the United States and the Soviet Union and preparations for a western alliance that would result in the North Atlantic Treaty superseded the Scandinavian negotiations.

When it became known that the western alliance's own pressing needs would prevent them from supplying the Scandinavian countries with armaments, Norway, wanting access to those arms, decided that it would be more advantageous to be a member of NATO and resigned from the talks. Denmark was still willing to enter into an alliance with Sweden, but the Swedes saw few advantages in this and the proposal failed. Norway and Denmark subsequently became signatory parties to the North Atlantic Treaty and members of NATO, while Sweden remained neutral.

== The Cold War ==
Sweden maintained its policy of neutrality after WWII, despite substantial cooperation with the West. Former Prime Minister of Sweden Carl Bildt has noted that this policy was in response to fears that if Sweden were to join NATO the Soviet Union might respond by invading neighbouring Finland, with which Sweden retained close relations. While nominally independent, Finland adopted a policy of neutrality on foreign affairs during the Cold War in deference to the neighbouring Soviet Union, which was commonly referred to as Finlandization. During the early Cold War, Sweden's neutrality policy was maintained even though its leaders understood that neutrality would probably fail in a third world war. The aim of the policy was to avoid the violent initial nuclear exchange between the superpowers. This was the rationale behind Sweden's policy of neutrality until the late 1960s with the advent of second strike capability and nuclear parity.

Initially after the end of World War II, Sweden quietly pursued an aggressive independent nuclear weapons program involving plutonium production and nuclear secrets acquisition from all nuclear powers, until the 1960s, when it was abandoned as cost-prohibitive. During the Cold War Sweden appeared to maintain a dual approach to thermonuclear weapons. Publicly, the strict neutrality policy was forcefully maintained, but unofficially strong ties were purportedly kept with the U.S. Sweden, for instance, cooperated extensively with U.S. intelligence: "Though officially neutral, Sweden in fact built very close ties to both NATO and the US security establishment in the late 1940s and early 1950s and was deeply involved in cold war spying operations."

It was hoped that the U.S. would use conventional and nuclear weapons to strike at Soviet staging areas in the occupied Baltic states in case of a Soviet attack on Sweden. Over time and due to the official neutrality policy, fewer and fewer Swedish military officials were aware of the military cooperation with the west, making such cooperation in the event of war increasingly difficult. At the same time Swedish defensive planning was completely based on help from abroad in the event of war. Later research has shown that every publicly available war-game training included the scenario that if Sweden was under attack from the Soviets, it would rely on NATO forces for defence. The fact that it was not permissible to mention this aloud eventually led to the Swedish armed forces becoming highly misbalanced. For example, a strong ability to defend against an amphibious invasion was maintained, while an ability to strike at inland staging areas was almost completely absent.

In the early 1960s U.S. nuclear submarines armed with mid-range nuclear missiles of type Polaris A-1 were deployed outside the Swedish west coast. Range and safety considerations made this a good area from which to launch a retaliatory nuclear strike on Moscow. The submarines had to be very close to the Swedish coast to hit their intended targets though. As a consequence of this, in 1960, the same year that the submarines were first deployed, the U.S. provided Sweden with a military security guarantee. The U.S. promised to provide military force in aid of Sweden in case of Soviet aggression. This guarantee was kept from the Swedish public until 1994, when a Swedish research commission found evidence for it. As part of the military cooperation the U.S. provided much help in the development of the Saab 37 Viggen, as a strong Swedish air force was seen as necessary to keep Soviet anti-submarine aircraft from operating in the missile launch area.

== Post–Cold War ==
After the end of the Cold War and the fall of the Soviet Union, Sweden dropped its official policy of military neutrality, but continued to behave as a neutral and non-aligned country. In 1995 Sweden joined the European Union (but declined Eurozone membership) and has since the mid-1990s continued to reduce its armed forces and became involved in more international missions in countries like Bosnia and Afghanistan. The continued reduction of its own national defence and the question of whether the country really could defend itself against an aggressor has led to some criticism.

In 2009 Sweden agreed to enter into mutual self-defence treaties with the EU, and with other Nordic countries, thus ending a nearly 200 year long period of official military neutrality. As a result of a 2010 U.S. diplomatic cables leak, it was learned that the United States government had described Sweden's "official security policy" as "non-participation in military alliances during peacetime and neutrality during wartime." However, Sweden does contribute to various NATO and EU battlegroups and is involved in international organizations. From March–October 2011, Sweden was a participant in the NATO-led international contingent in the War in Libya. In May 2016, a survey showed for the first time that more Swedes favored NATO membership than opposed it. All of the political parties that are part of the right-of-centre coalition favor full NATO membership.

After the full-scale Russian invasion of Ukraine that began on 2022, more Swedes favored NATO membership than opposed it. On May 16, the Swedish government announced its decision to apply to join NATO after staying militarily non-aligned for 200 years. After all 31 NATO members ratified the application, Sweden became the 32nd member of NATO on March 7, 2024.

=== Global surveillance disclosure ===
Despite Sweden's formal neutrality, Edward Snowden's disclosures suggest intelligence links with the US and its allies. In an alleged internal document dating from the year 2006, the U.S. National Security Agency acknowledged that its "relationship" with Sweden is "protected at the Top Secret level because of that nation's political neutrality." Specific details of Sweden's cooperation with members of the UKUSA Agreement include how:

- The National Defence Radio Establishment of Sweden (FRA) has been granted access to XKeyscore, an analytical database of the U.S. National Security Agency (NSA).
- Sweden updated the NSA on changes in domestic Swedish legislation that provided the legal framework for information sharing between the FRA and the Swedish Security Service.
- Since January 2013, a counterterrorism analyst of the NSA has been stationed in the Swedish capital of Stockholm

Several years before the Riksdag passed a controversial bill proposing a change in legislation of the FRA, Britain's Government Communications Headquarters (GCHQ), the NSA and the FRA signed an agreement in 2004 that allows the FRA to directly collaborate with the NSA without having to consult the GCHQ. As part of the UKUSA Agreement, a secret treaty was signed in 1954 by Sweden with the United States, the United Kingdom, Canada, Australia and New Zealand, regarding collaboration and intelligence sharing.

== See also ==
- List of Swedish wars
- Neutral country
- Austrian neutrality
- Irish neutrality
- Moldovan neutrality
- Swiss neutrality
- Neutral and Non-Aligned European States
- Neutral member states in the European Union
