= Irish neutrality =

Military neutrality of the Republic of Ireland

Ireland has a longstanding policy of military neutrality, which has meant not joining military alliances or defence pacts, or taking part in international conflicts. Irish neutrality is in general a matter of government policy rather than a requirement of statute law, with the 1937 constitution not defining neutrality as an aim of the state, and its nature has varied over time.

The Irish Free State declared itself a neutral country in 1922, and Ireland remained neutral during the Second World War; although it allowed Allied military aircraft to fly through part of its airspace, and shared intelligence with the Allies (see Irish neutrality during World War II). During the Cold War, it did not join NATO nor the Non-Aligned Movement. Since the 1970s, some have defined Irish neutrality more broadly to include a commitment to "United Nations peacekeeping, human rights and disarmament". Recent Irish governments have defined it narrowly as non-membership of military alliances.

Ireland is one of four European Union countries that are not members of NATO; the others are Austria, Cyprus and Malta. The compatibility of neutrality with Ireland's EU membership has been a point of debate in EU treaty referendum campaigns since the 1990s. The Seville Declarations on the Treaty of Nice acknowledge Ireland's "traditional policy of military neutrality". The Irish Defence Forces have been involved in many UN peacekeeping missions.

== Concept ==
There are notable differences between Irish neutrality and “traditional” types of neutral states:

- Traditionally, neutral states maintain strong defence forces; Ireland has a relatively small defence force of approximately 10,500 personnel.
- Traditionally, neutral states do not allow any foreign military within their territory; Ireland has a long history of allowing military aircraft of various nations to refuel at Shannon Airport. Under the Air Navigation (Foreign Military Aircraft) Order, 1952, the Minister for Foreign Affairs, exceptionally, could grant permission to foreign military aircraft to overfly or land in the state. Confirmation was required that the aircraft in question be unarmed, carry no arms, ammunition or explosives and that the flights in question would not form part of military exercises or operations.

After the September 11 attacks, these conditions were "waived in respect of aircraft operating in pursuit of the implementation of the United Nations Security Council Resolution 1368". Irish governments have always said that allowing aircraft to use Irish soil does not constitute participation in any particular conflict and is compatible with a neutral stance, adducing the transit of German troops between Finland and Norway through neutral Swedish territory during World War II.

A neutral state may also allow its citizens to serve in the armed forces of other, possibly belligerent, nations. Ireland does not restrict its citizens from serving in foreign armies, and significant numbers of Irish citizens serve or have served in the British, and to a lesser extent United States armies and the French Foreign Legion.

== Legal status ==
Ireland's neutrality is in general a matter of government policy rather than a requirement of statute law. One exception is Article 29.4.9° of the Irish constitution:

The State shall not adopt a decision taken by the European Council to establish a common defence pursuant to Article 42 of the Treaty on European Union where that common defence would include the State.

This was originally inserted by the 2002 amendment ratifying the Treaty of Nice, and updated by the 2009 amendment ratifying the Treaty of Lisbon. An earlier bill intended to ratify the Treaty of Nice did not include a common defence opt-out, and was rejected in the first Nice referendum, in 2001.

Other European Union member states have also maintained neutrality or military non-alignment alongside EU membership. Malta's constitution provides that "Malta is a neutral state" pursuing a policy of non-alignment and "refusing to participate in any military alliance", while Austria declared permanent neutrality in 1955. The Treaty on European Union provides that a common Union defence would require a unanimous decision of the European Council and adoption by member states "in accordance with their respective constitutional requirements", and states that EU security and defence policy "shall not prejudice the specific character of the security and defence policy of certain Member States".

The Defence Act 1954, the principal statute governing the Irish Defence Forces, did not oblige members of the Irish Army to serve outside the state (members of the Air Corps and Naval Service were not so limited). A 1960 amendment was intended to allow deployment in United Nations peacekeeping missions, and requires three forms of authorisation, which since the 1990s have come to be called the "triple lock":

1. A UN Security Council resolution or UN General Assembly resolution;
2. A formal decision by the Irish government;
3. Approval by a resolution of Dáil Éireann (the lower house of the Oireachtas or parliament, to which the government is responsible).

These provisions were modified in 1993 to allow for Chapter VII missions and again in 2006, when an "International United Nations Force" was defined to include an international force or body "established, mandated, authorised, endorsed, supported, approved or otherwise sanctioned" by a resolution of either the Security Council or the General Assembly. The General Assembly has authorised or mandated peace operations in the past, including the United Nations Emergency Force in 1956, the United Nations Temporary Executive Authority in West New Guinea in 1962, a joint United Nations/regional peace operation in Haiti in 1993, and a peace operation in Guatemala in the 1990s.

In 2025, the government proposed to eliminate the requirement of a UN mandate. Government arguments for reform have centred on the veto power of the permanent members of the Security Council. In March 2025, the Department of Defence said proposed amendments would remove "the power of UN Security Council permanent members to veto our national sovereign decisions", while also increasing the number of Defence Forces personnel that could be deployed without a Dáil resolution from twelve to fifty. In a Dáil debate in May 2026, a Government speaker said that the existing system "effectively allows permanent members of the Security Council to bind Ireland's hands in its international engagement". The statutory definition introduced in 2006, however, refers to a force or body sanctioned by a resolution of either the Security Council or the General Assembly.

A cited example was the 1999 Chinese veto of the renewal of the United Nations Preventive Deployment Force in Macedonia; the Security Council draft resolution had received thirteen votes in favour, with China voting against and Russia abstaining. In 2023, the Irish government stated that because the subsequent European Union peace operation in the former Yugoslav Republic of Macedonia, fYROM/CONCORDIA, did not have a Security Council mandate, Ireland was unable to participate in that mission.

== History ==
=== Before independence ===
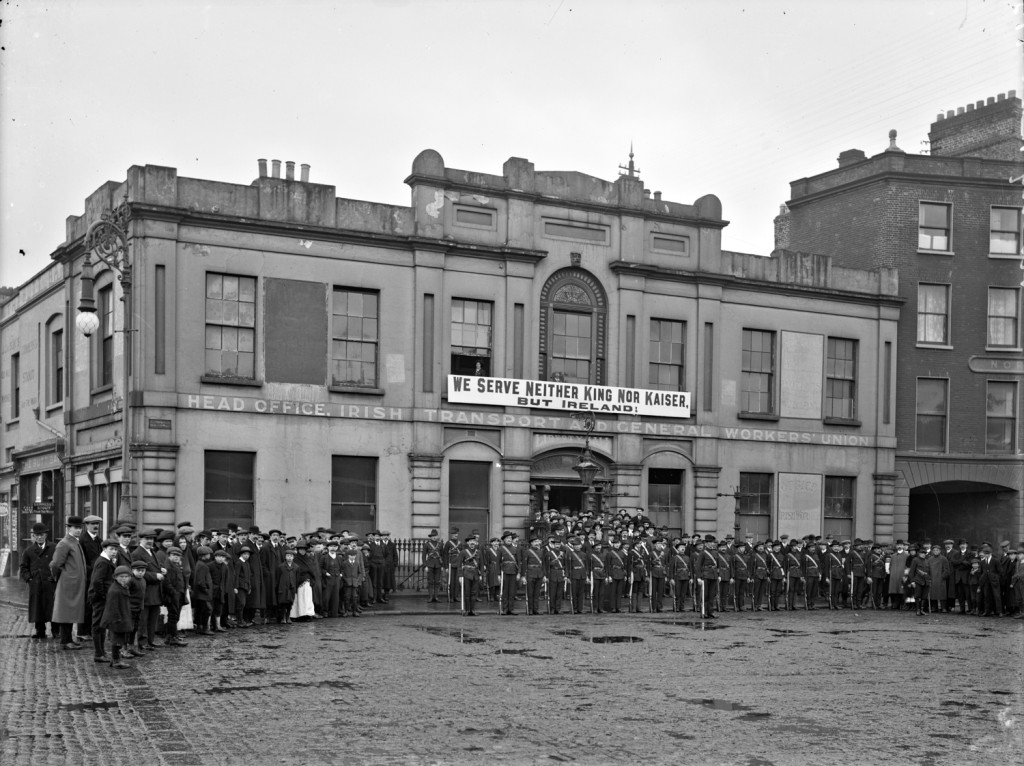
Irish Citizen Army outside Liberty Hall in 1914, in front of a banner reading "We serve neither King nor Kaiser but Ireland".

Irish leaders in the Nine Years' War (1594–1603) allied with Habsburg Spain, who sent military aid to the Irish. Following their defeat, all of Ireland was a dependency of England and then of Great Britain. During this period, Catholic soldiers from Ireland fought in the armies of several European Catholic countries, in what is known as the Flight of the Wild Geese. In 1644–1645, during the Wars of the Three Kingdoms, the Irish Confederacy sent a military expedition to Scotland to help the Scottish Royalists. During the Irish Rebellion of 1798, the United Irishmen sought and received military assistance from the French First Republic.

Ireland was part of the United Kingdom of Great Britain and Ireland from 1801 to 1922. While Irish unionists supported political integration with Britain, Irish nationalists were divided between those who envisaged some continuing link with Britain and the "advanced nationalists", mainly republicans, who wanted full independence. Separatists generally envisaged an independent Ireland being neutral, but were prepared to ally with Britain's enemies in order to secure that independence, reflected in the maxim "England's difficulty is Ireland's opportunity". At the outbreak of the First World War, James Connolly was president of the Irish Neutrality League and was prosecuted for a banner reading "We serve neither King nor Kaiser but Ireland". During the 1916 Easter Rising, Connolly and the other leaders of the uprising sought military aid from Germany.

In the 1921 negotiations leading to the Anglo-Irish Treaty, Erskine Childers envisaged the Irish Republic having a neutral status guaranteed in international law on the model of Belgium and Switzerland.

=== Irish Free State ===
The Irish Free State established in 1922 by the Anglo-Irish Treaty was a Dominion of the British Commonwealth, with the UK retaining responsibility for Ireland's marine defence as well as three naval bases, the "Treaty Ports". Article 49 of the 1922 Constitution of the Irish Free State stated, "Save in the case of actual invasion, the Irish Free State ... shall not be committed to active participation in any war without the assent of the Oireachtas [parliament]". In the 3rd Dáil debate on the draft constitution, the Provisional Government rejected a Labour Party amendment requiring assent of the electorate via referendum. Thomas Johnson argued "The war that is to be guarded against is a war overseas, is a war that this country may be drawn into by Parliament, by the will of Parliament perhaps, at the instigation of perhaps Canada, or perhaps Australia, or perhaps South Africa, or perhaps Great Britain, and the last is very much the more likely".

In the Statute of Westminster 1931, the UK renounced the right to legislate for the Free State. The 1938 Anglo-Irish Trade Agreement saw the Treaty Ports handed over to the Free State.

The Free State joined the International Committee for Non-Intervention in the Spanish Civil War. The Spanish Civil War (Non-Intervention) Act, 1937 made it an offence to travel from Ireland to Spain to fight for either side. This applied both to Irish citizens and nationals of other countries on the committee. Nevertheless, there was Irish involvement in the Spanish Civil War on both sides by private individuals and groups. Another statute related to the committee was the Merchant Shipping (Spanish Civil War) Act 1937, which restricted Irish shipping's access to Spain until 27 April 1939.

=== World War II ===
Ireland remained neutral during World War II. The Fianna Fáil government's position was flagged years in advance by Taoiseach Éamon de Valera and had broad support. James Dillon was the only member of Dáil Éireann to oppose it during the war, resigning from Fine Gael in 1942 and demanding that Ireland assist the Allies (while not necessarily declaring war on the Axis). However, tens of thousands of Irish citizens, who were by law British subjects, fought in the Allied armies against the Nazis, mostly in the British army. Senators John Keane and Frank MacDermot also favoured Allied support.

De Valera said in his wartime speeches that small states should stay out of the conflicts of big powers; hence Ireland's policy was officially "neutral", and the country did not publicly declare its support for either side. In practice, while Luftwaffe pilots who crash-landed in Ireland and German sailors were interned, Royal Air Force (RAF), Royal Canadian Air Force (RCAF), and United States Army Air Forces (USAAF) pilots who crashed were released on personal assurances and usually allowed to cross the border into British territory (although some Allied personnel were also interned). The internees were referred to as "guests of the nation". The German embassy had to pay for their keep. If they were on a non-combative mission they were repatriated. While it was easy for Allied pilots to make that claim, it was not realistic for Luftwaffe pilots to make a similar claim. Towards the end of the war, the German embassy was unable to pay, so the internees had to work on local farms. Strict wartime press censorship had the effect of controlling a moral reaction to the war's unfolding events and reiterated the public position that Irish neutrality was morally superior to the stance of any of the combatants.

Allied military aircraft were allowed to overfly County Donegal to bases in County Fermanagh. This was known as the Donegal Corridor. The bodies of any crashed Allied airmen were repatriated by the Irish Army at the border, where they would be met by an Allied officer. On at least one occasion, an Allied Air Force officer thanked his Irish counterpart for the honour they bestowed upon the repatriated airmen. The Irish captain was said to reply, "Ours may be the honour, but yours is the glory."

USAAF aircraft flying to North Africa refuelled at Shannon Airport and flying boats at nearby Foynes.

During the war, an estimated 70,000 citizens of neutral Ireland served as volunteers in the British Armed Forces (and another estimated 50,000 from Northern Ireland). Those who deserted the Irish Army to serve in the British Army, on returning to Ireland were stripped of all pay and pension rights, and banned for seven years from any employment paid for by state or government funds.

Irish military intelligence (G2) shared information with the British military and even held secret meetings to decide what to do if Germany invaded Ireland to attack Britain, which resulted in Plan W, a plan for joint Irish and British military action should the Germans invade. However General Hugo McNeill, the commander of the Irish Second Division based on the Northern Ireland border, had private discussions with the German ambassador, Edouard Hempel, about German military assistance in the event of a British invasion from the north. De Valera declined Germany's offer of captured British weapons. The Germans did have a plan for an invasion of Ireland called Operation Green, similar to the Allies' Operation Bodyguard, but it was only to be put into operation with Operation Sea Lion, the plan to conquer Britain.

During the Belfast Blitz in April 1941, when the Luftwaffe bombed Belfast in Northern Ireland, De Valera responded immediately to a request for help from Basil Brooke, Prime Minister of Northern Ireland. Fire engines were sent from the south to help their Belfast colleagues. De Valera formally protested to the German government and made a speech declaring "they are our people".

Irish neutrality during the war was threatened from within by the Irish Republican Army (IRA), which sought to provoke a confrontation between Britain and Ireland. This plan collapsed, however, when IRA chief of staff Seán Russell died in a U-boat off the Irish coast as part of Operation Dove; the Germans also later came to realise they had overestimated the capabilities of the IRA. The American ambassador, David Gray, stated that he once asked de Valera, early in the war, what he would do if German paratroopers "liberated" Derry. According to Gray, de Valera was silent for a time and then replied "I don't know."

Many German spies were sent to Ireland, but all were captured quickly as a result of good intelligence and sometimes their ineptitude. The chief Abwehr spy was Hermann Görtz.

As the state was neutral, Irish cargo ships continued to sail with full navigation lights. They had large tricolours and the word "EIRE" painted large on their sides and decks. Irish ships rescued more than 500 seamen, and some airmen, from many countries during the war. However, many Irish ships were attacked by belligerents on both sides. Over 20% of Irish seamen died, on clearly marked neutral vessels, in the Irish Mercantile Marine during World War II.

Winston Churchill, the British wartime Prime Minister, made an attack on the Irish Government and in particular Éamon de Valera in his radio broadcast on VE Day. Churchill maintained that the British government displayed restraint on the Irish state while the de Valera government were allowed to "frolic with the Germans". Churchill maintained that the British could have invaded the Irish state, but displayed "considerable restraint" in not doing so. De Valera replied to Churchill in a radio broadcast:

Mr. Churchill makes it clear that in certain circumstances he would have violated our neutrality and that he would justify his action by Britain's necessity. It seems strange to me that Mr. Churchill does not see that this, if accepted, would mean that Britain's necessity would become a moral code and that when this necessity became sufficiently great, other people's rights were not to count....this same code is precisely why we have the disastrous succession of wars... shall it be world war number three?

=== The Cold War ===
During the Cold War, Ireland maintained its policy of neutrality. It did not align itself officially with NATO, the Warsaw Pact, or the Non-Aligned Movement. It refused to join NATO due to a sovereignty dispute over Northern Ireland with the United Kingdom, a NATO member. Ireland offered to set up a separate alliance with the United States but this was refused. This offer was linked in part to the $133 million received from the Marshall Aid Plan.

However, secret transmission of information from the government to the CIA started in 1955. The link was established by Liam Cosgrave via a Mr. Cram and the Irish embassy in London, and was not revealed until December 2007. In 1962–63, during the Cuban Missile Crisis, Seán Lemass authorised searches of aircraft that stopped over at Shannon while flying between Warsaw Pact countries and Cuba, for "warlike material".

In 2023, The Irish Times reported that in 1952 the Irish government agreed to a secret memorandum of understanding with the UK government regarding air defence, by which the Royal Air Force can apply to intercept hostile or unidentified aircraft in Irish airspace, as the Irish Air Corps lacked the means to do so. Unidentified sources said the agreement has been renewed by subsequent Irish governments despite misgivings. A spokesperson for the Department of Foreign Affairs said its policies are carried out "with full respect for Irish sovereign decision-making authority and for Ireland's long-standing policy of military neutrality". James Heappey, a British minister of state for defence, acknowledged that RAF jets had "deployed into Irish airspace on occasion". In 2023, Irish senator Gerard Craughwell applied to the High Court for a judicial review of its constitutionality. According to the UK Defence Journal, "the arrangement does not constitute UK responsibility for Irish air defence", but is mainly for air traffic safety, as hijacked or non-transponding aircraft are a risk to civilians.

Ireland applied to join the then European Communities in 1963 and finally acceded in 1973. Garret FitzGerald, who was Minister for Foreign Affairs 1973–77, claims that both Fianna Fáil and Fine Gael in the 1960s and 1970s accepted that European integration would eventually reach a point where Ireland would have to join in defence co-operation. FitzGerald points to Charles Haughey's opposition to the explicit mention of neutrality in a 1981 Dáil motion, stating that Haughey adopted a more pro-neutrality stance upon entering opposition later in 1981.

=== 1990s–2010s ===
The 1994 coalition government undertook not to change the policy of military neutrality without a referendum. That government's 1996 white paper on foreign policy stated:

The majority of the Irish people have always cherished Ireland's military neutrality, and recognise the positive values that inspire it, in peace-time as well as time of war. Neutrality has been the policy of the State in the event of armed conflict and has provided the basis for Ireland's wider efforts to promote international peace and security.

It recommended joining NATO's Partnership for Peace and participating in humanitarian missions of the Western European Union (WEU), but opposed joining NATO or the WEU as incompatible with military neutrality.

Ireland provided 120 Defence Forces personnel as trainers to the International Security Assistance Force mission in the 2001–2021 Afghanistan War. The personnel were provided under United Nations mandate.

The Fianna Fáil-led government did not take a position on the 2003 invasion of Iraq. Ireland, then a member of the UN Security Council, voted "yes" to Resolution 1441, which warned of "serious consequences" if Iraq did not comply with weapons inspectors. Some United States Air Force planes were allowed to refuel at Shannon Airport before and during the conflict, as were civilian aircraft transporting US military personnel; others had permission to overfly Irish air space. A resolution of the Dáil on 20 March 2003 approved these arrangements.

Anti-war activist Edward Horgan took a case in the High Court seeking declarations that the government, in allowing use of Shannon, had breached the state's obligations as a neutral state. While the court held that the custom in international law was that "a neutral state may not permit the movement of large numbers of troops or munitions of one belligerent State through its territory en route to a theatre of war with another", it found this was not part of Irish domestic law, as Irish neutrality was "a matter of government policy only". The Dáil resolution implied that letting military aircraft refuel at Shannon did not amount to "participation" in the war, and the courts had no power to overrule the Dáil on this issue.

In 2006, the Minister for Defence, Willie O'Dea, announced that the Irish government would open talks on joining the European Union battle groups. O'Dea said that joining the battlegroups would not affect Ireland's military neutrality, and that a UN mandate would be required for all battlegroup operations with Irish participation. Green Party foreign affairs spokesperson John Gormley condemned the decision, saying that the government was "discarding the remnants of Irish neutrality".

Taoiseach Enda Kenny said in 2007: "the truth is, Ireland is not neutral. We are merely unaligned".

In 2012, the Oireachtas established a joint committee to review petitions submitted by the public. An early petition sought clarification of government policy in relation to the use of Irish airspace by foreign military aircraft. In 2013–16 the committee held discussions with the petitioners, government members, the Secretary General of the Department of Foreign Affairs and Trade, and academics, and issued a report, which stated:

The Joint Committee note the lacuna between what is understood by the citizens by neutrality and what is the de facto position. Accordingly, the Joint Committee recommend that the Dáil and Seanad debate the matter of neutrality with a view to the holding of a Referendum so that the will of the people can be determined.

In 2015, the Fine Gael–Labour government published a foreign policy review which stated, "Our policy of military neutrality remains a core element of Irish foreign policy." It defined neutrality as "non-membership of military alliances and non-participation in common or mutual defence arrangements", while working with international organisations for peacekeeping missions.

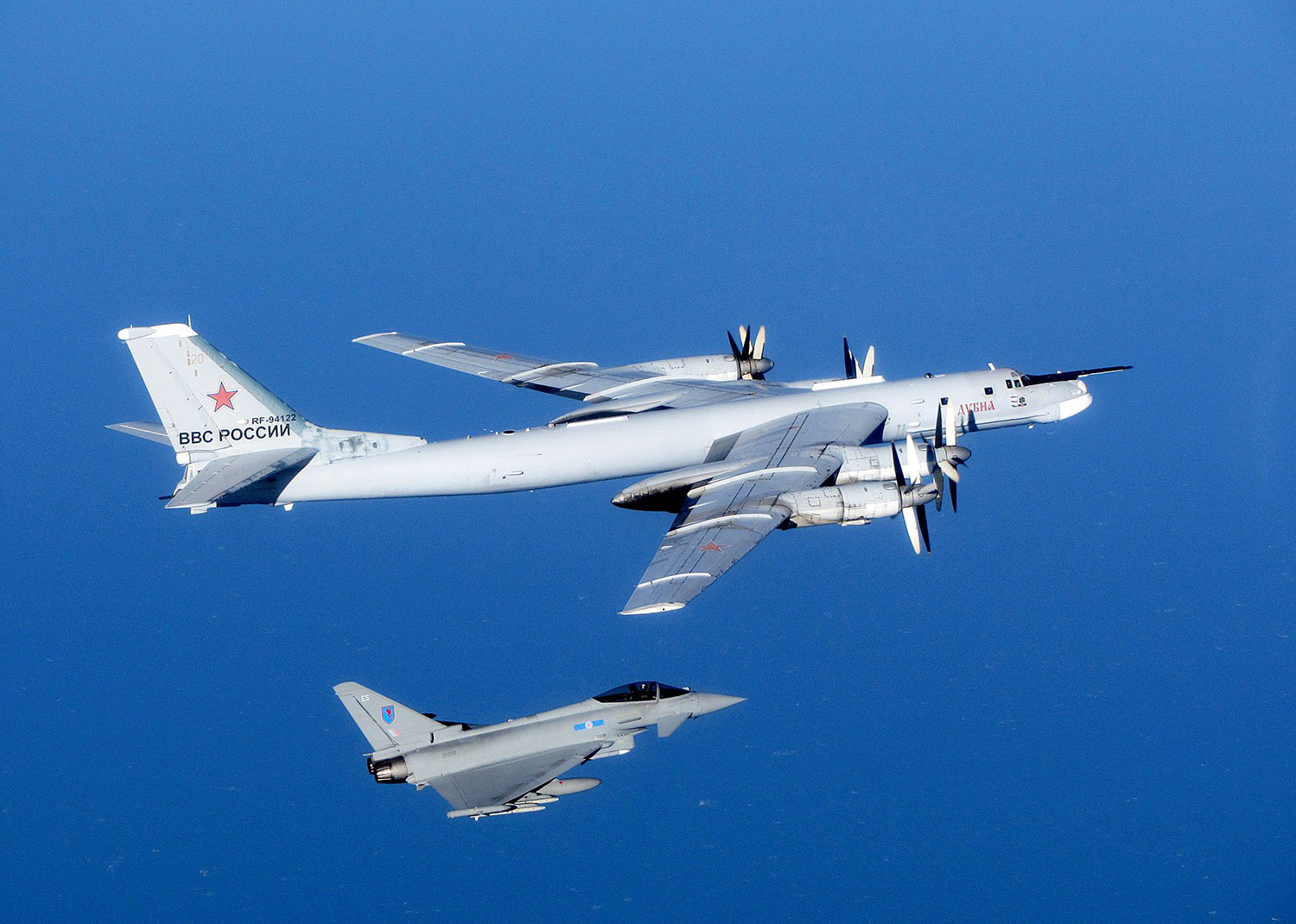
An RAF Typhoon intercepting a Russian Tupolev Tu-95 bomber in 2014

Since the Russian annexation of Crimea, Russian bomber aircraft have deliberately flown into Irish-controlled airspace several times, without warning or permission, and with their transponders switched off. This poses a safety threat to civilian airliners. Because the Irish Air Corps lacks air defence or the means to intercept these bombers, the British Royal Air Force (RAF) have entered Irish-controlled airspace (which differs from Irish sovereign airspace) and intercepted them. In February 2015, it was reported that two Russian Tupolev Tu-95 "Bear" bombers twice flew into Irish-controlled airspace, with their transponders switched off. Unidentified sources in the Norwegian and British militaries claimed that the bombers were carrying unarmed nuclear warheads. The bombers flew within 25 nautical miles of the Irish coast. In March 2020, the IAA said two unidentified military aircraft entered Irish-controlled airspace. The British airforce said they were Russian bombers, which were intercepted by British fighters, with a British airforce spokesperson saying it was a "routine response to Russian aircraft approaching UK air space and co-ordinated with several other Nato allies".

Ireland joined the EU's Permanent Structured Cooperation (PESCO) when it was founded in December 2017. The Fine Gael-led government said it would participate on a case-by-case basis and membership did not compromise neutrality. Fianna Fáil supported membership; Sinn Féin, the Greens, Solidarity, and People Before Profit opposed it; the Labour Party had reservations.

=== Since the Russian invasion of Ukraine ===
In January 2022, during the buildup to the Russian invasion of Ukraine, Russia controversially announced plans to hold naval drills about 150 nautical miles off the coast, within Ireland's exclusive economic zone. It was to involve naval artillery and missiles. Local fishermen protested to the Russian embassy and announced they would continue to fish in the area regardless. Russia's Ambassador to Ireland, Yury Filatov, warned the fishermen to "refrain from any provocative actions which might endanger all involved". Eventually, in response to requests from the Irish government, Russia's Minister of Defence Sergey Shoigu agreed to move the naval drills further away from Ireland.

In a Dáil discussion that month on the Russo-Ukrainian crisis, Richard Boyd Barrett of People Before Profit asked:

Why does the Government correctly condemn Russian military exercises in Irish waters but allow the US military to use Shannon Airport [?] ... Neutrality means not taking sides in dangerous conflicts and game-playing between major imperial powers.

Taoiseach Micheál Martin replied:

Ireland accepts Ukrainian territorial integrity [...] We're not politically neutral but we're militarily neutral. It's an important distinction. We're members of the European Union. We work with our European Union colleagues in terms of rules-based multilateral approaches to international disputes.

In response to Russia's invasion of Ukraine on 24 February 2022, the Tánaiste Leo Varadkar stated that while Ireland is not militarily aligned, the country is "not neutral at all" in relation to this conflict and that "support for Ukraine is unwavering and unconditional". Days later the Department of Foreign Affairs said it would "constructively abstain" from an EU fund for military aid to Ukraine, but contribute instead to a fund that did not include weaponry.

Since the invasion, the Irish Navy and Air Corps have increasingly observed Russian "spy ships" believed to be mapping critical undersea communications cables and energy pipelines off the Irish coast. Some of them are escorted by Russian warships and are fitted with equipment for sabotaging undersea cables.

In March 2023 a bill to hold a referendum on Irish membership in a hypothetical European army was opposed by the government, who called it "unnecessary". Micheál Martin said that if the referendum had taken place he was confident it would have passed and that Ireland needs to 'reflect' on the issue of neutrality.

A Consultative Forum on International Security Policy was held in Dublin, Cork and Galway during 2023. It was a public forum to discuss Ireland's foreign, security and defence policy. Micheál Martin, then Minister for Defence and Foreign Affairs, said every country in Europe had reviewed their defence and security in the wake of Russia's invasion of Ukraine. President of Ireland, Michael D. Higgins, rebuffed the forum, saying that Ireland was drifting away from neutrality and "playing with fire". His comments were criticised by government ministers. The forum was disrupted by anti-NATO protesters from the Connolly Youth Movement; with Martin accusing them of being "undemocratic" and "trying to shut down debate". Boyd Barrett accused those involved in the forum of "trying to soften up public opinion to abandoning Ireland's neutrality."

In the 2025 Irish presidential election, eventual winner Catherine Connolly criticised government proposals to remove the triple lock. Her vision statement on the President of Ireland's official website states she "wants to be a voice for equality and justice and for the defence of neutrality as an active, living tradition of peacemaking, bridge-building and compassionate diplomacy".

== United Nations peacekeeping ==
Irish Defence Forces personnel first served on United Nations peacekeeping duties in 1958, when about fifty officers were assigned to the United Nations Observation Group in Lebanon (UNOGIL); after that mission ended, some transferred to the United Nations Truce Supervision Organization (UNTSO). The first armed Irish contingent was deployed to the United Nations Operation in the Congo (ONUC) from 1960 to 1964; more than 6,000 Irish personnel served in the mission and 26 died, while Irish officer Seán Mac Eoin served as force commander from 1961 to 1962.

Peacekeeping has been described by the Irish government as a central part of Ireland's international role. The Department of Foreign Affairs states that Ireland has had a continuous presence on UN and UN-mandated peace support operations since 1958, while the Defence Forces state that Ireland has continuously provided an armed contingent to the UN since the Congo mission except between May 1974 and May 1978. Major deployments have included UNFICYP in Cyprus, UNIFIL in Lebanon, UNDOF in the Golan Heights, and UNTSO in the Middle East.

Irish participation has included both UN-led operations and missions authorised or mandated by the UN but led by other organisations. In 1998, Ireland signed a memorandum of understanding with the United Nations Standby Arrangements System, offering to provide up to 850 Defence Forces personnel for UN peacekeeping operations at any given time. Since 2007, Irish Defence Forces personnel have also served in missions authorised by the UN and led by the European Union or NATO, including EUFOR Chad and KFOR in Kosovo.

== Weapons control ==
A 2004 report by Forfás noted that the policy of neutrality is a factor in Ireland's lack of an arms industry and strict export controls on weapons. The latter were previously enforced by the Control of Exports (Goods and Technology) Order 2009, a statutory instrument made under the Control of Exports Act 1983. The 2009 order was replaced by the Control of Exports (Goods and Technology) Order 2012, which reflects the 2008 EU Common Position on Arms Exports. The 2004 Forfás report noted concerns about dual-use technology and the use as weapons components of products from major Irish export industries such as chemicals, telecommunications equipment, computer chips and software. The state is also bound by EU regulations and international arms control treaties. In 2017, four export licence applications were refused for dual-use items. In the 1980s and early 1990s, successive governments rebuffed proposals by companies including Eurometaal and Thyssen Henschel to establish arms manufacturing and repair plants in the state, on the grounds that it might compromise neutrality and that there was then no specific legislation limiting the area to which the arms could be exported.

== See also ==
- Austrian neutrality
- Finlandization
- Foreign relations of the Republic of Ireland
- Ireland–NATO relations
- Neutral states
- Neutral member states in the European Union
- History of Ireland
- History of Northern Ireland
- Moldovan neutrality
- Swedish neutrality
- Swiss neutrality
- Conscription in Ireland
- Irish Shipping Limited
- Seville Declarations on the Treaty of Nice
- Visa policy of Ireland
