= Moldovan neutrality =

Policy of Moldova

Moldova is officially a neutral country. Neutrality is enshrined by Article 11 of the 1994 Constitution of Moldova. Adopted following Moldova's defeat in the Transnistria War in 1992, neutrality enjoys widespread support among the Moldovan population. Moldova together with Turkmenistan are the only post-Soviet states that declared neutrality after independence.

== History and analysis ==
Neutrality is enshrined in the 1994 Constitution of Moldova. Article 11 states "the Republic of Moldova proclaims its permanent neutrality" and "the Republic of Moldova does not accept the presence of any foreign military troops on its territory". Furthermore, Article 142 states that neutrality, among other issues, can only be revised through a referendum. Earlier, the 1990 sovereignty declaration of the Moldavian SSR within the Soviet Union called for the demilitarization of Moldova in the context of the need of the withdrawal of the Soviet Armed Forces from the republic, with this call being renewed in Moldova's 1991 Declaration of Independence. Moldova and Turkmenistan are the only among the post-Soviet states that declared neutrality after their independence.

Moldovan historian Gheorghe E. Cojocaru stated in 2022 that the adoption of neutrality was a consequence of the Moldovan defeat in the Transnistria War in 1992. This would have had the objectives of helping overcome the consequences of the war, maintain an internal political balance and remain at an equal distance between the main geopolitical actors of the region. Cojocaru stated that the impact that Moldova's neutrality has had so far could be analyzed from two aspects, these being that neutrality had ensured that Moldova resisted all attempts of getting it involved into military collaboration projects in the region and that the policy had not been respected in the face of continued Russian military presence in Transnistria.

The Russian invasion of Ukraine in 2022 caused reconsiderations in Moldova regarding its neutral status. In an interview for Politico, published on 20 January 2023, President of Moldova Maia Sandu said a "serious discussion" was taking place in the country about Moldova's capacity to defend itself and about whether it should join a larger military alliance, without explicitly mentioning NATO. She also said that any such change would require a democratic process. Shortly after, on 16 February, the first day of his premiership, Prime Minister Dorin Recean defied what he called the narrative of "some politicians" according to which Moldova's neutral status automatically implied its defence and declared that a time when neutrality "will no longer work" could come.

== Public opinion ==
Neutral status enjoys widespread support within Moldovan society. A poll held from 14 to 18 October 2022 showed that 44.1% of Moldovans believed neutrality was the solution for ensuring Moldova's security, well above the second most voted option, accession to the European Union (EU), with 12.2% of the votes. In a poll held from 13 to 28 June 2023, 30.6% voted that the best solution would be neutrality without an increase in investments into the country's defence and security, 18.6% voted neutrality with an increase in such investments and 19.2% voted EU accession.

Furthermore, a potential accession of Moldova into neighbouring military alliances or enhanced collaboration with them is not very favored by most Moldovans. The 13–28 June 2023 poll showed that 28% would vote in a hypothetical referendum in favor of Moldova's accession into NATO while 60.3% would vote against. As for the Collective Security Treaty Organization (CSTO), a poll held from 12 to 22 February 2023 showed Moldovan collaboration with the alliance was regarded as the method for guaranteeing Moldova's security by 16.3%, the second most voted option, well below the option of neutrality and strengthening of the armed forces with 43.3% of the votes.

In a 2023 article for Deutsche Welle, Moldovan journalist Vitalie Ciobanu noted the apparent contradiction shown in polls by the Moldovans in favor of uniting with Romania and those in favor of joining NATO, as the former was more popular than the latter even though Romania is a NATO member.

== See also ==
- Moldova–NATO relations
- Transnistria conflict
- Austrian neutrality
- Finlandization
- Irish neutrality
- Swedish neutrality
- Swiss neutrality
