= Declaration of Neutrality =

1955 Austrian law declaring the country's permanent neutrality

The Declaration of Neutrality (German: Neutralitätserklärung) was a declaration by the Austrian Parliament declaring the country permanently neutral. It was enacted on 26 October 1955 as a constitutional act of parliament, i.e., as part of the Constitution of Austria.

Pursuant to resolution of the Federal Assembly of Parliament following the Austrian State Treaty, Austria declared "its permanent neutrality of its own accord". The second section of this law stated: "In all future times Austria will not join any military alliances and will not permit the establishment of any foreign military bases on her territory."

== History ==
Formally, the declaration was promulgated voluntarily by the Republic of Austria. Politically, it was the direct consequence of the Allied occupation by the Soviet Union, the United States, the United Kingdom, and France between 1945 and 1955. Prior to that, Stalin's government in the USSR did not want to withdraw from its occupation zone in Austria, which included Vienna, and considered creating an pro-Soviet buffer state in Austria, similar to East Germany. The USSR finally agreed to withdraw its occupation forces from Austria only in 1955, after Nikita Khrushchev came to power and abandoned Stalin’s policy of confrontation with the West in favor of peaceful co-existence. However, the Soviet Union refused to sign the Austrian State Treaty and to withdraw its troops, unless Austria had committed to declaring neutrality. The actual withdrawal was completed on October 25, 1955, 90-days after the Austrian Parliament ratified the Austrian State Treaty, as an amendment to Article 9a of its 1920 Constitution.

Since 1955, neutrality has become a deeply ingrained element of Austrian identity. During the Cold War not only Austria maintained trade and other relations with Warsaw Pact and COMECON countries, but it also refused to implement the sanctions against South Rhodesia imposed by the United Nations in 1965.

In 1995, prior to joining the European Union, Austria held a referendum on whether to approve constitutional amendments, allowing for such membership. One of these amendments allowed Austria to participate the Common Foreign and Security Policy of the Union, while maintaining the country's general policy of permanent neutrality.

In the following years, Austria opposed the US-led invasion of Iraq in 2003, did not join the "coalition of the willing", and even banned the flights on NATO military planes over its territory, because this operation was not authorized by the United Nations.

An opinion poll from March 2022 found that 76% favored Austria remaining neutral, versus 18% who supported joining NATO.

Membership of Austria in the European Union (or its predecessor organizations) was controversial due to the Austrian constitutional commitment to neutrality, which could have been in contradiction with the EU's Common Security and Defense Policy. Austria only joined the bloc in 1995 together with Finland and Sweden which had also declared their neutrality in the Cold War, following a referendum on accession.

In 1995, Austria joined NATO's Partnership for Peace program, but only after Russia had done so.

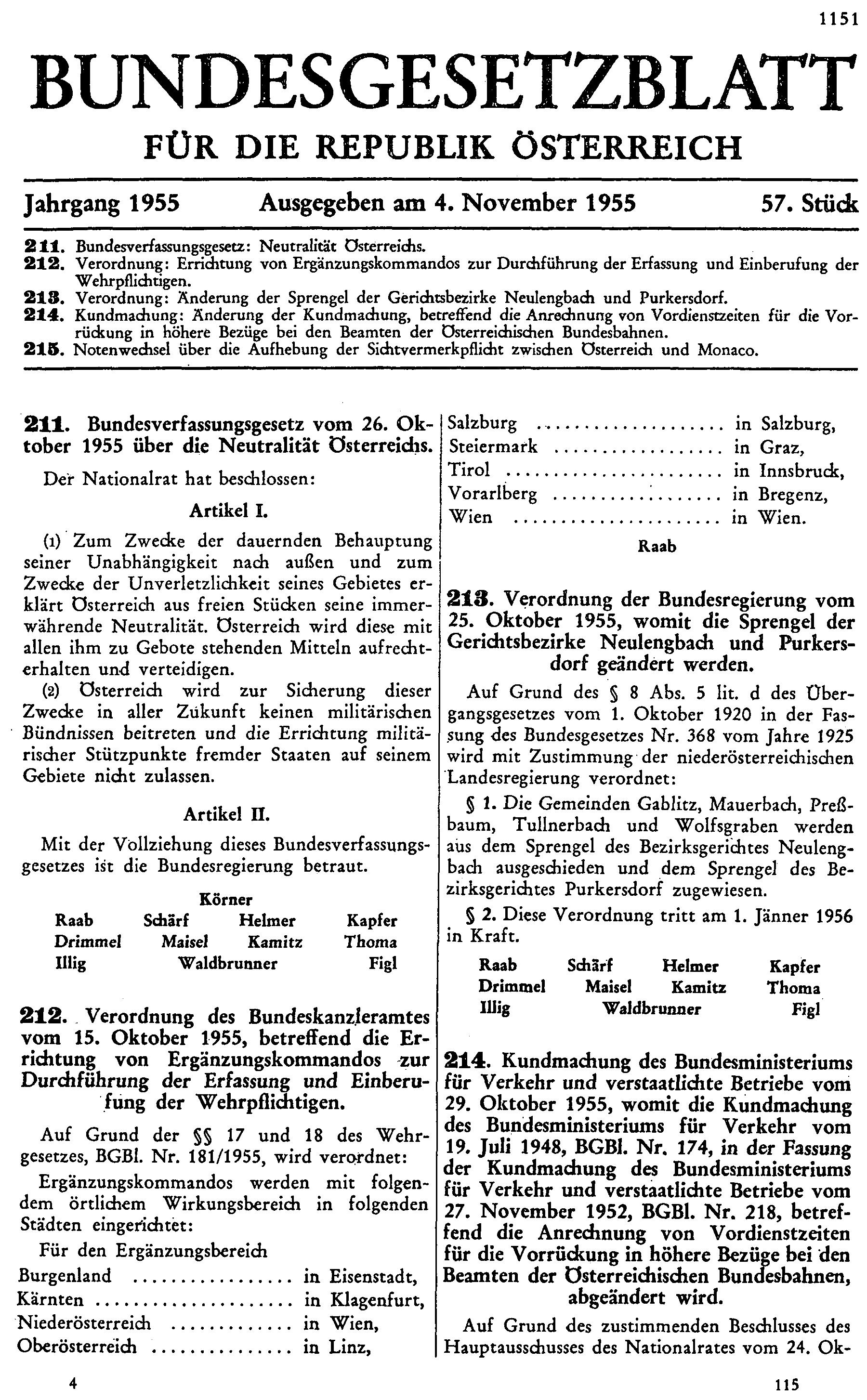
The Bundesgesetzblatt containing the Federal Constitutional Law on the Neutrality of Austria

== Recent developments ==
Since the Russo-Ukrainian war in 2022, the Austrian government has signaled a willingness to challenge Austria’s long-standing constitutional policy of neutrality. A recent study, based on the data collected in 2024, concluded that Austrians had a more favorable view of Ukrainian refuges, compared to those from other countries. However, Austrian public opinion strongly favors neutrality and is strongly against Austria joining NATO.

On March 30, 2023, Freedom Party of Austria members walked out of a speech delivered via video by Ukrainian President Volodymyr Zelenskyy to the Austrian parliament on the 400th day of the Russian invasion of Ukraine. They argued the speech violated Austria's neutrality and left placards reading "space for neutrality" and "space for peace" on their desks.

On July 7, 2023, Austria joined the European Sky Shield Initiative created in 2022 as a reaction to the Russian invasion of Ukraine. The project would fund the development of a missile defense system for Europe. The Austrian government argued that, because their resources are being pooled with other countries, this initiative was not a violation of neutrality.

== International collaborations ==
Austria engages in UN-led peacekeeping and other humanitarian missions. It participates in:

- KFOR, with up to 561 soldiers. This mission is alongside NATO forces. Other countries in this mission include Switzerland, even more well known for its neutrality.
- EUFOR (former SFOR) in Bosnia and Herzegovina, since 2 December 2004 under European Union Command
- United Nations Interim Force in Lebanon (UNIFIL) in Lebanon.

In 2023, Austria (and Switzerland) joined a coalition of European, mostly NATO-allied countries in the European Sky Shield Initiative (ESSI), which is a project to build an integrated air defence system with anti-ballistic missile capability.

== See also ==
- Austria–NATO relations
- Finlandization
- Irish neutrality
- Moldovan neutrality
- Swedish neutrality
- Swiss neutrality
- Neutral and Non-Aligned European States
- Neutral member states in the European Union

== Bibliography ==
- Rolf Steininger: Der Staatsvertrag. Österreich im Schatten von deutscher Frage und Kaltem Krieg 1938-1955, 2005, 198 p., (Publisher: StudienVerlag, Innsbruck-Wien-Bozen) - Summary in English
- Manfried Rauchensteiner: Stalinplatz 4. Österreich unter alliierter Besatzung, 2005, 336 p., (Publisher: Edition Steinbauer, Wien)
- The Federal Constitutional Law on the Neutrality of Austria in English
- Кружков В.А. (2022). Нейтралитет Австрии. Становление - практика - перспективы. Moscow: Аспект Пресс. ISBN 978-5-7567-1198-1.
