= Conscription in Ireland =

Military conscription has never applied in Ireland (both Northern Ireland and Republic of Ireland). The Defence Forces are the armed forces of the Republic of Ireland, and serves as an all-volunteer military. Irish neutrality means Ireland has been neutral in international relations since the 1930s, though it has participated in several United Nations peacekeeping missions.

== Early history ==
During the period of British rule, press gangs operated in Ireland as they did in Britain, conscripting men to serve in the Royal Navy. Impressment in Ireland began in the early modern era, with such activities peaking during major conflicts and then subsequently receding. For example, in 1734, impressment took place in Wicklow Town. Impressment was also common during the Napoleonic wars, although poverty in Ireland made sure that volunteers were usually available.

In 1793, the Irish Militia was established by the Dublin Castle administration as a result of the outbreak of the French Revolutionary Wars to defend Ireland from invasion. Enlisted members of the Irish Militia were officially intended to be randomly chosen by local ballots, though widespread opposition to this led to the introduction of an amendment to allow for parishes to pay fines in lieu of holding ballots, which would be used to recruit volunteer replacements.

== 20th century ==
The Irish Volunteers, a paramilitary organisation founded in 1913, took the name of the 18th-century militia units raised in Ireland; both groups saw the fact that they were all-volunteer forces as a source of pride. The term "volunteer" is used as a title for members by Irish republican paramilitary groups descended from or inspired by the Irish Volunteers, such as the Provisional Irish Republican Army.

The Conscription Crisis of 1918 arose when the Lloyd George ministry attempted to extend conscription, which was already implemented in Britain, to Ireland due to World War I. The Mansion House Conference, held to oppose the introduction of conscription to Ireland, was organised by Irish nationalist groups, including Sinn Féin, the Irish Parliamentary Party and the Irish Catholic Bishops' Conference. Sinn Féin's perceived leading role helped it to win most Irish seats in the 1918 general election.

During World War II, the Republic of Ireland remained neutral and initiated a state of emergency. The Emergency Powers Act 1939 gave the government of Ireland sweeping powers to bypass the Oireachtas and the Constitution of Ireland for the duration of "the Emergency". However, both military and industrial conscription were excluded from the scope of the act by a section added at committee stage. In May 1941, there were reports that the Churchill war ministry was considering extending conscription, which was already in place in Great Britain, to Northern Ireland due to wartime demands. On 26 May, the 10th Dáil was recalled for a special sitting to protest. On 27 May, Winston Churchill told the House of Commons of the United Kingdom "it would be more trouble than it is worth" to introduce conscription to Northern Ireland, and the idea was abandoned.

== Contemporary debate ==
Many supporters of Irish neutrality oppose the deepening of the Common Security and Defence Policy of the European Union. Irish supporters of European integration have accused their opponents of circulating rumours about Irish citizens being potentially conscripted into a European army. Such claims were made regarding the Treaty of Lisbon by some fringe groups during the 2008 referendum campaign and believed by "48% of 'no' voters and remarkably 26% of 'yes' voters".
