= List of wars involving the Republic of Ireland =

This is a list of wars involving the Republic of Ireland and its predecessor states, since the Irish War of Independence. Since the 1930s, the state has had a policy of neutrality and has only been involved in conflicts as part of United Nations peacekeeping missions.

There have been many wars on the island of Ireland throughout history. Before independence, all of Ireland was part of the United Kingdom and Irish soldiers fought in many wars as part of the British military. Irish soldiers also fought in conflicts as part of other armies.

== List ==
Conflict	Combatant 1	Combatant 2	Result
Irish War of Independence (1919–1921)	Irish Republic	United Kingdom	Victory: Anglo-Irish Treaty; Dominion status for 26 counties of Southern Ireland as the Irish Free State; 6 counties of Northern Ireland remain part of UK; United Kingdom retains the Ports of Berehaven, Spike Island and Lough Swilly
Irish Civil War (1922–1923)	Irish Free State (pro-Treaty forces) Military support: United Kingdom	Anti-Treaty IRA (anti-Treaty forces)	Pro-Treaty victory: Consolidation of the Irish Free State
Congo Crisis (1960–1964)	(United Nations) ONUC: Ireland; Others	Katanga	Victory: Debellation of the State of Katanga
Cyprus conflict (1964–present)	(United Nations) UNFICYP: Ireland; Others	Turkey Cyprus; Greece	Ongoing
The Troubles (1968–1998)	State security forces Ireland: Irish Defence Forces; Gardaí	Irish republican paramilitaries: Saor Éire (1967–75); Provisional IRA(1969–97); Official IRA(1969–72); INLA (1974–98); IPLO (1986–92); CIRA (1994–); RIRA (1997–); Ulster loyalist paramilitaries: UVF(1966–94); UDA/UFF(1971–94); RHC(1972–94); UR (1986–); LVF (1996–)	Stalemate: Good Friday Agreement; Principle of consent accepted by all major parties involved; Devolved powers to the local Northern Ireland Assembly; Ceasefire and decommissioning of weapons from paramilitary groups; Withdrawal of British troops from Northern Ireland; Reform of the local police force
Lebanese Civil War (1978–present)	(United Nations) UNIFIL: Ireland; Others	South Lebanon Army; Israel Hezbollah; Amal; PFLP-GC	Ongoing
Somali Civil War (1992–1995)	(United Nations) UNOSOM II: Ireland; Others	(Somalia) United Somali Congress	Victory: UN humanitarian mandate fulfilled; About 100,000 lives were saved by outside resistance; Civil war is ongoing
Yugoslav Wars (1991–2001)	United Nations peacekeeping force: Ireland; Kosovo Force	(Federal Republic of Yugoslavia) FR Yugoslavia	Victory: Stabilisation of the Balkans; On-going Active Irish Presence
East Timorese Crisis (1999–2000)	(United Nations) UNTAET: Ireland; Others	Pro-Indonesia militia	Victory: Defeat of pro-Indonesian militia; Stabilisation of East Timor

== See also ==
- List of conflicts in Ireland
- List of wars involving the United Kingdom of Great Britain and Ireland
- List of Irish military casualties overseas
