= Conscription Crisis of 1918 =

British political crisis involving Ireland

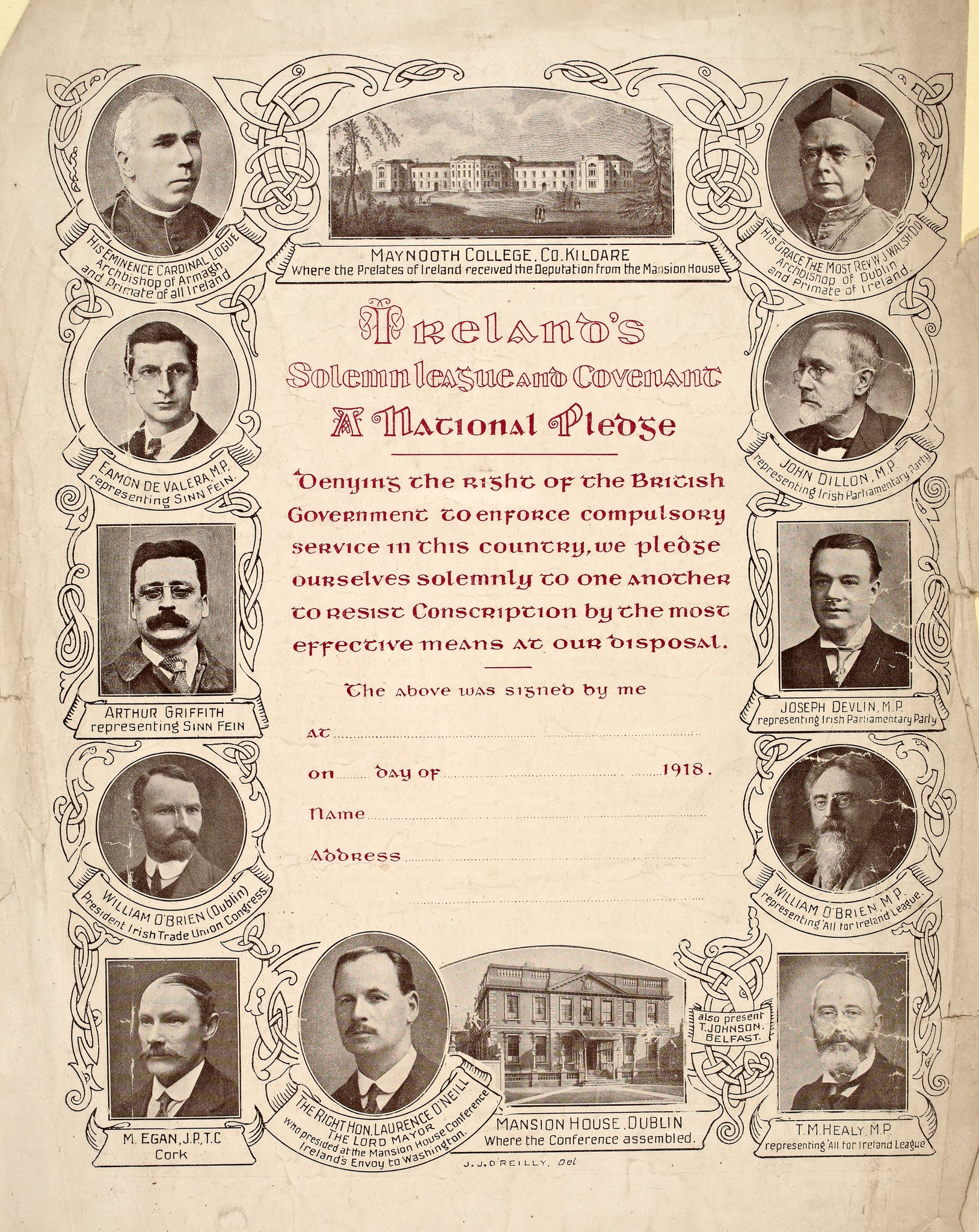
Ireland's Solemn League and Covenant Pledge 1918, with portraits of Bishops Conference and Mansion House Committee members

The Conscription Crisis of 1918 stemmed from a move by the British government to impose conscription (military draft) in Ireland in April 1918 during the First World War. Vigorous opposition was led by trade unions, Irish nationalist parties and Roman Catholic bishops and priests. A conscription law was passed but was never put in effect; no one in Ireland was drafted into the British Army. The proposal and backlash galvanised support for political parties which advocated Irish separatism and influenced events in the lead-up to the Irish War of Independence.

== Background ==
In early 1918, the British Army was dangerously short of troops for the Western Front. In the German Spring Offensive of 1918, German troops broke through the Allied lines in several sectors of the front in France, with a local advantage in numbers of four to one, putting severe strain on the Allied armies. The British Army, in one day, suffered a major setback, with the Imperial German Army over-running 250 square kilometres (98 sq mi) of territory and penetrating, at the furthest point, to a depth of seven kilometres (4 1/2 mi). Conscription in Great Britain had already been established by the Military Service Act of January 1916, which came into effect a few weeks later in March 1916. By 1918 David Lloyd George was Prime Minister, leading a coalition government, and in addressing a very grave military situation it was decided to use a new 'Military Service Bill' to extend conscription to Ireland and also to older men and further groups of workers in Britain, thus reaching untapped reserves of manpower.

Although large numbers of Irishmen had willingly joined Irish regiments and divisions of the New Army at the outbreak of war in 1914, the likelihood of enforced conscription created a backlash. This reaction was based particularly on the fact that, in a "dual policy", Lloyd George controversially linked implementation of the Government of Ireland Act 1914 or a new Home Rule Bill (as previously recommended in March by the Irish Convention) with enactment of the Military Service Bill. This had the effect of alienating both nationalists and unionists in Ireland.

The linking of conscription and Home Rule outraged the Irish nationalist parties at Westminster, including the IPP, All-for-Ireland League and others, who walked out in protest and returned to Ireland to organise opposition. Despite opposition from the entire Irish Parliamentary Party (IPP), conscription for Ireland was voted through at Westminster, becoming part of the 'Military Service (No. 2) Act, 1918' (8 Geo. 5, c. 5).

Although the crisis was unique to Ireland at the time, it followed similar campaigns in Australia (1916–17) and Canada (1917). In Australia, Irish Catholics mostly opposed conscription; in Canada (and the US), Irish Catholics supported conscription.

The threat of conscription resulted in a plan, proposed by Cathal Brugha, to assassinate British cabinet members in April 1918, before they could vote on conscription (or as reprisal for having done so). Though the plan was never carried through, the stress of the plan reputedly had a significant impact on the republicans involved.

== Conferences and pledge ==
The nine Anti-Conscription Committee members Clickable image: Hover for name, click for article

On 18 April 1918, acting on a resolution of Dublin Corporation, the Lord Mayor of Dublin (Laurence O'Neill) held a conference at the Mansion House, Dublin. The Irish Anti-Conscription Committee was convened to devise plans to resist conscription, and represented different sections of nationalist opinion: John Dillon and Joseph Devlin for the Irish Parliamentary Party, Éamon de Valera and Arthur Griffith for Sinn Féin, William O'Brien and Timothy Michael Healy for the All-for-Ireland Party and Michael Egan, Thomas Johnson and William O'Brien representing Labour and the trade unions.

On the evening of the same day, the Roman Catholic bishops were holding their annual meeting and declared the conscription decree an oppressive and unjust law, calling on the Church's adherents to resist "by the most effective means at our disposal" (if "consonant with the law of God.")

The Anti-Conscription Committee and bishops proposed an anti-conscription pledge that was to be taken at the church door of every Roman Catholic parish the next Sunday, 21 April, which read:

Denying the right of the British government to enforce compulsory service in this country, we pledge ourselves solemnly to one another to resist conscription by the most effective means at our disposal.

== Strikes and other actions in Ireland ==
Following their representation at the Mansion House, the labour movement made its own immediate and distinctive contribution to the anti-conscription campaign. A one-day general strike was called in protest, and on 23 April 1918, work was stopped in railways, docks, factories, mills, theatres, cinemas, trams, public services, shipyards, newspapers, shops, and even Government munitions factories. The strike was described as "complete and entire, an unprecedented event outside the continental countries".

In the following weeks, anti-conscription rallies were held nationwide, with 15,000 people attending a meeting in County Roscommon at the start of May, where John Dillon, leader of the Irish Parliamentary Party and Éamon de Valera of Sinn Féin shared the platform. This in itself is notable as, while sharing nationalist views, Dillon and de Valera's parties had previously been divided in opinion as to the means of gaining legislative or complete independence from the United Kingdom.

On 11 June Dublin's Lord Mayor, Laurence O'Neill, in a letter to the President of the United States Woodrow Wilson called for support against conscription:

In the fourth year of a war ostensibly begun for the defence of small nations, a law conscribing the manhood of Ireland has been passed, in defiance of the wishes of our people .... To warrant the coercive statute, no recourse was had to the electorate of Britain, much less to that in Ireland. Yet the measure was forced through within a week, despite the votes of Irish representatives and under a system of closure never applied to the debates, which established conscription for Great Britain on a milder basis.

== "German plot" ==
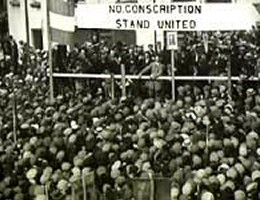
Dillon on platform during Roscommon anti-conscription rally in 1918

Nervous of growing unrest and still with dire need to progress conscription in Ireland, Lloyd George's government undertook several initiatives to quell the backlash.

As Sinn Féin was publicly perceived to be the key instigator of anti-government and anti-conscription feeling, Lord Lieutenant of Ireland Lord French, claiming evidence of a treasonable plot between Sinn Féin and the Germans, ordered the arrest of 73 Sinn Féin leaders, including Griffith and de Valera, on 17 May. The heavy-handed response by the Dublin Castle authorities did little to defuse the situation. In fact, because of the lack of evidence, the German Plot was little believed in Great Britain, Ireland or the United States, but aggravated opinion and increased support for Sinn Féin.

== Hay Plan ==
Simultaneously, a more subtle effort (and assessed by later historians as having more potential for success) was undertaken from the offices of Lord Northcliffe under the Minister of Information. The "Hay Plan" was conceived by Stuart Hay—a British Army Captain, who was under orders to establish a proposal to work around widespread anti-conscription feeling and to persuade Irish nationalists to join the French army (initially as labourers in specialised battalions). Hay's plan relied on the power of the Roman Catholic Church in Ireland (and empathy among its supporters for fellow Catholics in Belgium and France suffering from German invasion), to sway opinion:

If the church were definitely or even in a large measure converted and the support it has given to disloyal elements be not taken away but thrown on to the other side in the controversy [the conscription crisis], much would be done for the future of the peace in Ireland.

— Stuart Hay

The plan simply called for a letter (drafted by Hay and approved by Edward Shortt and then Chief Secretary for Ireland) to be sent by the French Primate to the Irish bishops, requesting that they soften their opposition to conscription to aid the war effort in France.

Despite some progress in August in persuading Primate of All Ireland Cardinal Logue, the "Hay Plan" was delayed and ultimately stymied by complications in diplomatic channels and by political rivalries. The latter included concerns by some in the British Parliament that reciprocal French support of Irish interests would not be to Britain's advantage after the war.

In France, the German Spring Offensive and its following attacks had failed by July, and the Allies counterattacked successfully at the Second Battle of the Marne and the Hundred Days Offensive. Recruitment efforts through September and October continued to have very limited success, and by the time of the November Armistice, marking the end of World War I, conscription had still not been implemented in Ireland.

== After-effects ==
By June 1918 it had become apparent to most observers in Britain and Ireland that following the defeat of the German Offensives and the accelerated deployment of US troops to Europe (the US had entered the war in April 1917 but had deployed relatively few troops at first) the tide of war had changed in favour of the Allied armies in Europe, and by 20 June the Government had dropped its conscription and home rule plans, given the lack of agreement of the Irish Convention. However the legacy of the crisis remained.

Completely ineffectual as a means to bolster battalions in France, the events surrounding the Conscription Crisis were disastrous for the Dublin Castle authorities, and for the more moderate nationalist parties in Ireland. The delay in finding a resolution to the home rule issue, partly caused by the war, and exaggerated by the Conscription Crisis in Ireland, all increased support for Sinn Féin.

Sinn Féin's association (in the public perception at least) with the 1916 Easter Rising and the anti-conscription movement, directly and indirectly led on to their landslide victory over (and effective elimination of) the Irish Parliamentary Party, the formation of the first Dáil Éireann and in turn to the outbreak of the Anglo-Irish War in 1919. (See: Aftermath of World War I – United Kingdom and 1918 United Kingdom general election in Ireland).

This opposition also led in part to Sinn Féin being ignored by the subsequent victors at the Paris Peace Conference in 1919, despite its electoral success. It appointed representatives who moved to Paris and several times requested a place at the conference, with recognition of the Irish Republic, but never received a reply.

The crisis was also a watershed in Ulster Unionism's relations with Nationalist Ireland, as expressed by Unionist leader James Craig: "for Ulster Unionists the conscription crisis was the final confirmation that the aspirations of Nationalists and Unionists were unrecompatible. [sic]"

== Voluntary enlistment ==
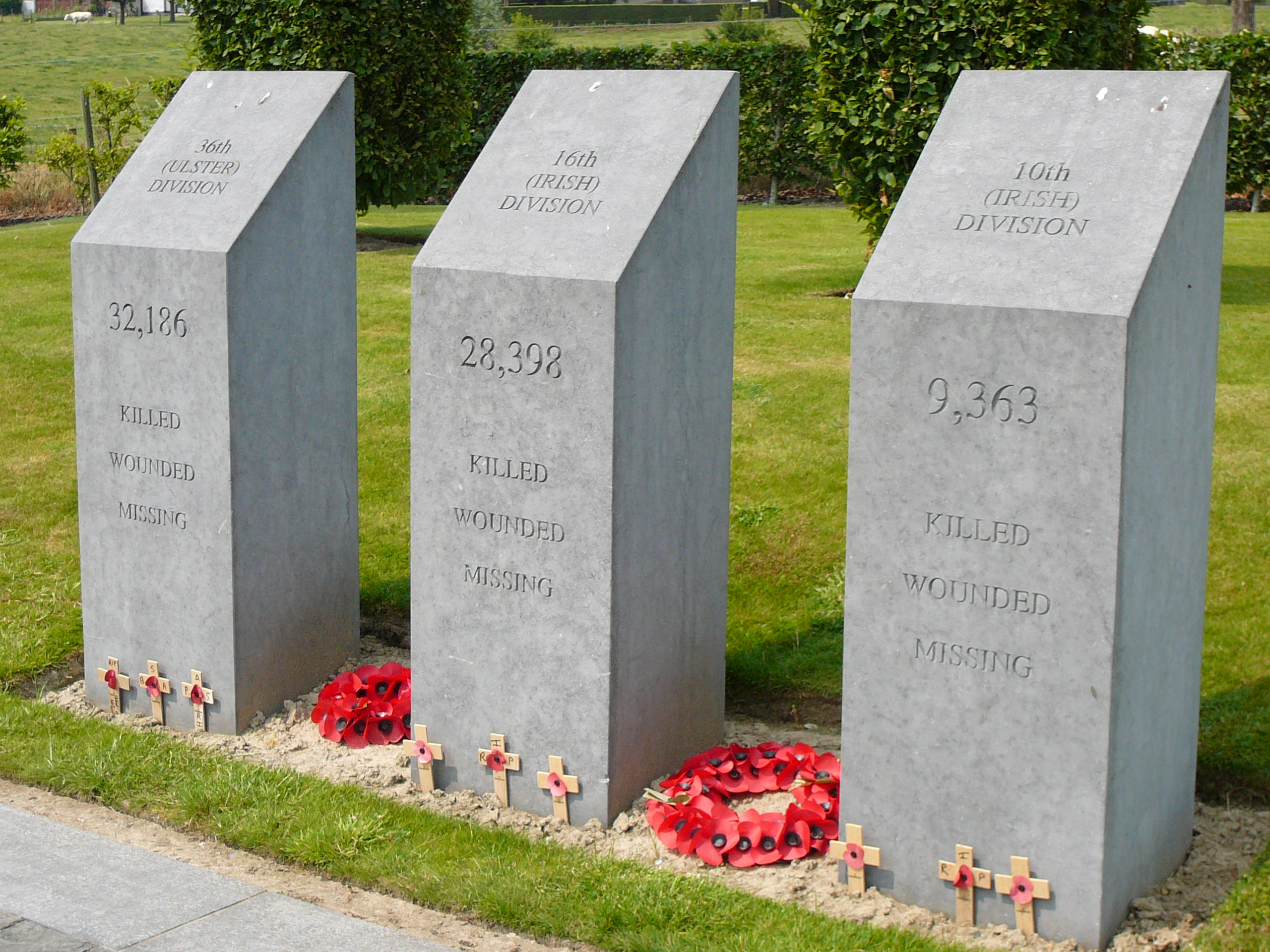
Memorial to casualties of Irish volunteer regiments at Island of Ireland Peace Park

The bulk of opposition to the Great War in Ireland was to compulsory conscription, not to the war nor to voluntary enlistment in the British Army. In fact, many Irish supported the war and Irish involvement.

Support and enlistment were more prominent amongst Irish Unionist and Protestant traditions, but nationalist and Roman Catholic enlistment was also common, as the war was seen to be fought in defence of smaller Catholic countries like occupied Belgium. In this cause, those who would later become detractors of conscription (including John Dillon, William O'Brien and the Roman Catholic bishops) were prominent on recruitment platforms at the outbreak of the war.

In all, 200,000 to 300,000 Irishmen served with British forces during the Great War, and, of the 680,000 fatalities from the United Kingdom of Great Britain and Ireland, some 40,000 to 49,000 were from Ireland. In all about 12.3 per cent of Irish men of service age actually served, approximately 25 per cent of the rate in the rest of the UK; 57 per cent of them were Roman Catholics.

== See also ==
- 1918 in Ireland (for dates and timeline)
- Aftermath of World War I – United Kingdom of Great Britain and Ireland
- Conscription Crisis of 1917 in Canada
- Conscription in Ireland
- History of Ireland (1801–1922)
- Opposition to World War I
