= Finlandization =

Concept in political science

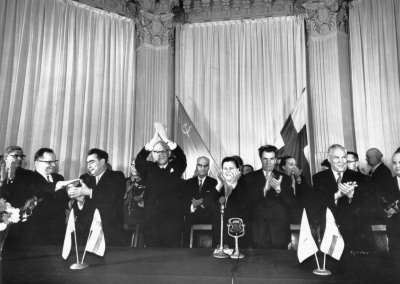
Urho Kekkonen and Leonid Brezhnev in 1960 during Kekkonen's state visit to the Soviet Union.

Finlandization is the process by which one powerful country makes a smaller neighboring country refrain from opposing the former's foreign policy rules, while allowing it to keep its nominal independence and its own political system. The term means "to become like Finland", referring to the influence of the Soviet Union on Finland's policies during the Cold War.

The term is often considered pejorative. It originated in the West German political debate of the late 1960s and 1970s. As the term was used in West Germany and other NATO countries, it referred to a country's decision not to challenge a more powerful neighbour in foreign policy while maintaining national sovereignty. It is commonly used in reference to Finland's policies in relation to the Soviet Union during the Cold War, but it can refer more generally to similar international relations, such as Denmark's attitude toward Germany between 1871 and 1940, or the policies of the Swiss government towards Nazi Germany until the end of World War II. Finland's policy of military neutrality came to an end with Russia's invasion of Ukraine. On 18 May 2022, the country along with Sweden applied for NATO membership. On 4 April 2023, Finland became the alliance's 31st member.

== Origin and international usage ==
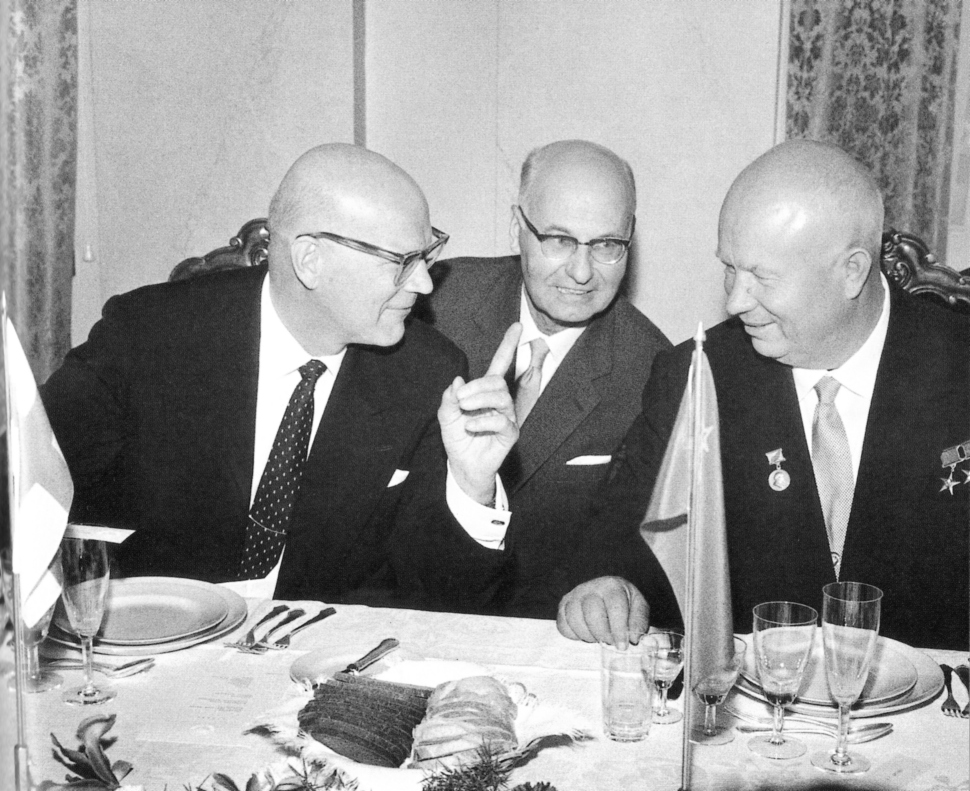
Finland's President Urho Kekkonen, translator Kustaa Loikkanen and General Secretary Nikita Khrushchev talking, at Kekkonen's 60th birthday

In Germany, the term was used mainly by proponents of closer adaptation to US policies, chiefly Franz Josef Strauss, but was initially coined in scholarly debate, and made known by the German political scientists Richard Löwenthal, Walter Hallstein and Kurt Birrenbach, reflecting feared effects of withdrawal of US troops from Germany. It came to be used in the debate of the NATO countries in response to Willy Brandt's attempts to normalize relations with East Germany, and the following widespread scepticism in Germany against NATO's Dual-Track Decision. Later, after the fall of the Soviet Union, the term has been used in Finland for the post-1968 radicalization in the latter half of the Urho Kekkonen era.

In the 1990s, Finlandization was also discussed as a potential strategy that the Soviet Union under Gorbachev may have attempted to revise its relationship with the Warsaw Pact states from 1989 to 1991, as a way to transition from informal empire to a looser sphere of influence model, which was precluded by the fall of the USSR.

As early as 2010, Shinzo Abe feared the Finlandization of Japan and South Korea by China due to its growing influence and power.

The term has also been used in discussing other countries, for example as a potential outcome of the Russo-Ukrainian War.

== Finnish perception ==
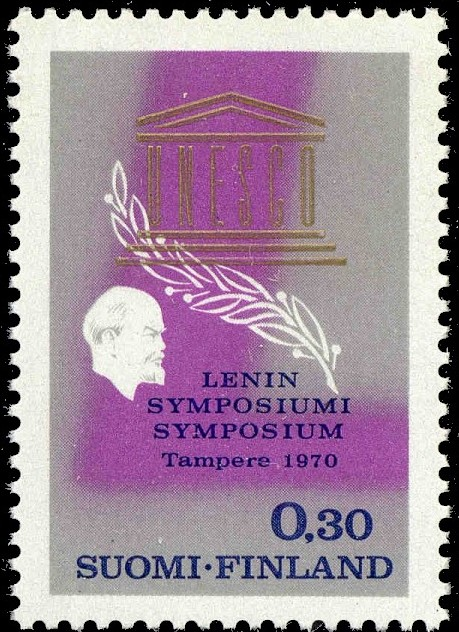
In April 1970, a Finnish stamp was issued in honour of the 100th anniversary of the birth of Vladimir Lenin and the Lenin Symposium held that year in Tampere.

Finns have, and had, a wide variety of reactions to the term "Finlandization". Some have perceived the term as blunt criticism, stemming from an inability to understand the practicalities of how a small nation needs to deal with an adjacent superpower without losing its sovereignty. These practicalities existed primarily because of the lingering effects of Russian rule before the Finns first gained sovereignty, and because of the precarious power balance to the east, stemming from a geographically extensive yet sparsely populated state bordering a traditionally imperialist superpower.

The reason Finland engaged in Finlandization was primarily Realpolitik—to survive. On the other hand, the threat from the Soviet Union was also used in Finland's domestic politics, possibly deepening Finlandization (playing the so-called idänkortti, 'east card'). Finland made such a deal with Joseph Stalin's government in the late 1940s, and it was largely respected by both sides—and to their mutual benefit—until the fall of the Soviet Union in 1991. While the Finnish political and intellectual elite mostly understood the term to refer more to the foreign policy problems of other countries, and meant mostly for domestic consumption in the speaker's own country, many ordinary Finns considered the term highly offensive. The Finnish political cartoonist Kari Suomalainen once explained Finlandization as "the art of bowing to the East without mooning the West".

=== Historical background ===
Finland's foreign politics before this deal had been varied: independence from Imperial Russia with support of Imperial Germany in 1917; participation in the Russian Civil War (without official declaration of war) alongside the Triple Entente 1918–1920; a non-ratified alliance with Poland in 1922; association with the neutralist and democratic Scandinavian countries in the 1930s ended by the 1939 Winter War against the Soviet Union, in which the Finns thwarted the Soviet attempt to conquer Finland, albeit with the cession of 9% of Finnish territory; and finally in 1940, a rapprochement with Nazi Germany, the only power able and willing to help Finland against the expansionist Soviet Union, which led to Finland's re-entry into the Second World War in 1941.

=== Paasikivi doctrine ===
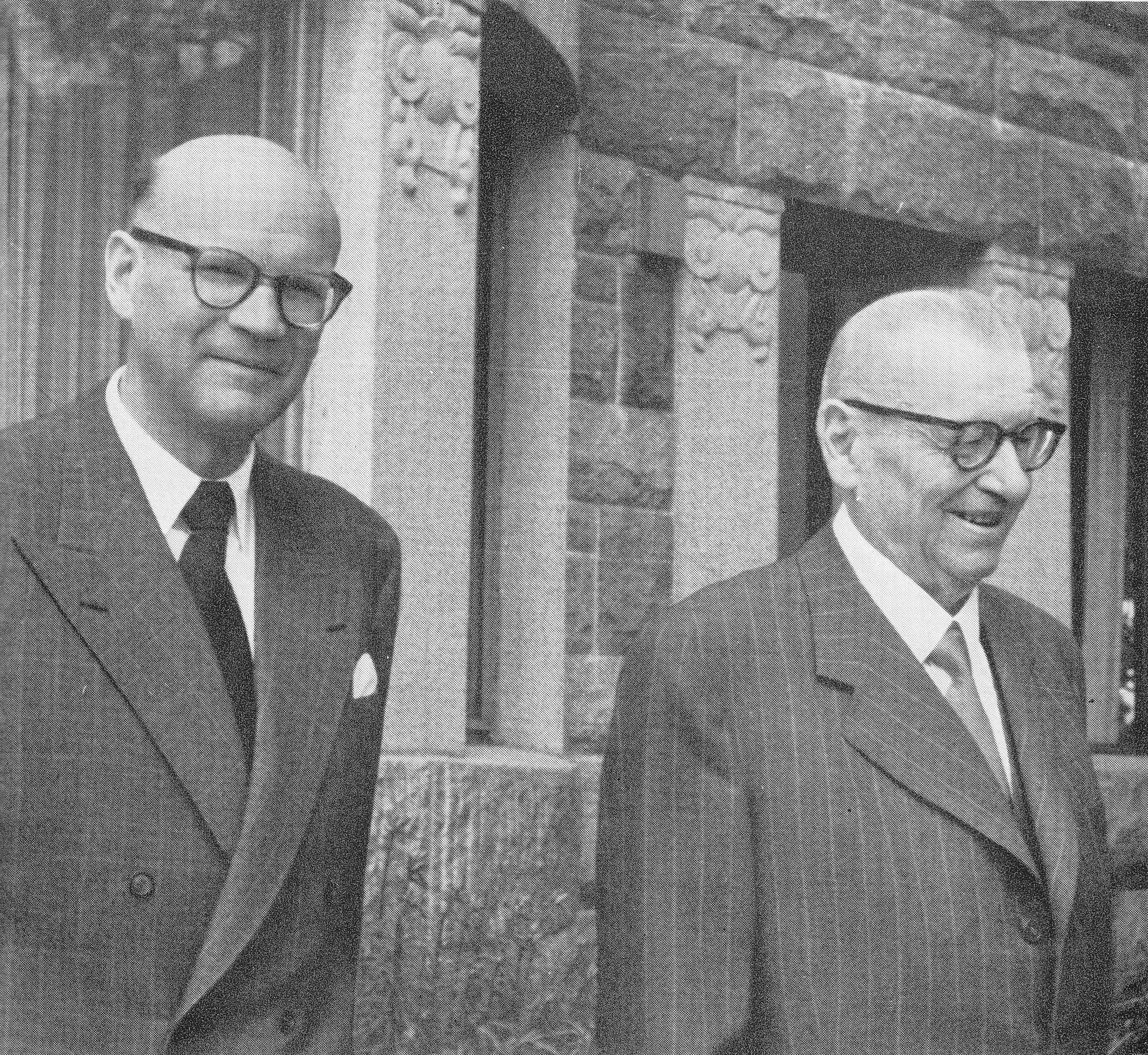
Urho Kekkonen and Juho Kusti Paasikivi

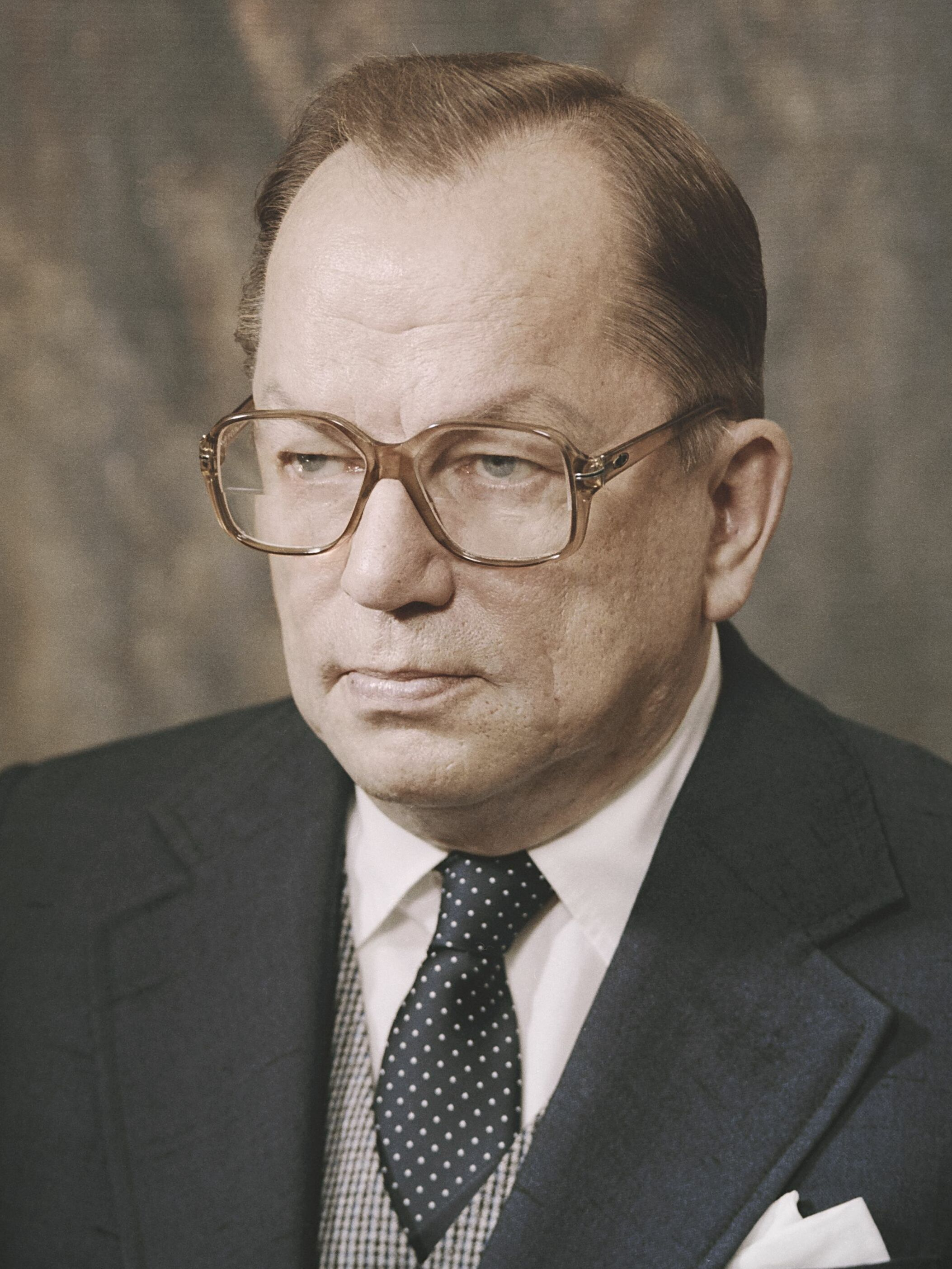
Ahti Karjalainen was one of the influential figures in Finnish politics during the Cold War and especially for its good relations with the East

After the Paris Peace Treaty of 1947, Finland succeeded in retaining democracy and parliamentarism despite heavy political pressure from the Soviet Union on Finland's foreign and internal affairs. Finland's foreign relations were guided by the doctrine formulated by Juho Kusti Paasikivi, emphasising the necessity to maintain a good and trusting relationship with the Soviet Union.

Finland signed an Agreement of Friendship, Cooperation, and Mutual Assistance with the Soviet Union in April 1948, under which Finland was obliged to resist armed attacks by "Germany or its allies" against Finland, or against the Soviet Union through Finland, and, if necessary, ask for Soviet military aid to do so. At the same time, the agreement recognized Finland's desire to remain outside great power conflicts, allowing the country to adopt a policy of neutrality during the Cold War.

As a consequence, Finland did not participate in the Marshall Plan and adopted a neutral stance toward Soviet overseas initiatives. By maintaining arms-length relations with NATO and Western military powers in general, Finland could fend off Soviet pressure to join the Warsaw Pact.

=== Self-censorship and excessive Soviet adaptation ===
Only after Mikhail Gorbachev's ascent to Soviet leadership in 1985 did the mass media in Finland gradually begin to criticize the Soviet Union more openly. When the Soviet Union allowed non-communist governments to take power in Eastern Europe, Gorbachev suggested they could look to Finland as an example to follow.

=== Censorship ===
Between 1944 and 1946, the Soviet part of the Allied Control Commission demanded that Finnish public libraries remove more than 1,700 books deemed anti-Soviet from circulation, and bookstores were given catalogs of banned books. The Finnish Board of Film Classification likewise banned films that it considered to be anti-Soviet. Banned films included One, Two, Three (1961), directed by Billy Wilder; The Manchurian Candidate (1962), directed by John Frankenheimer; One Day in the Life of Ivan Denisovich (1970), by Finnish director Caspar Wrede; and Born American (1986), by Finnish director Renny Harlin.

The censorship never took the form of purging. Possession or use of anti-Soviet books was not banned, but their reprinting and distribution were prohibited. Especially in the realm of radio and television self-censorship, it was sometimes hard to tell whether the motivations were even political. For example, once a system of blacklisting recordings had been introduced, individual policy makers within the national broadcaster, Yleisradio, also utilized it to censor songs they deemed inappropriate for other reasons, such as some of those featuring sexual innuendo or references to alcohol.

=== End of Finlandization ===
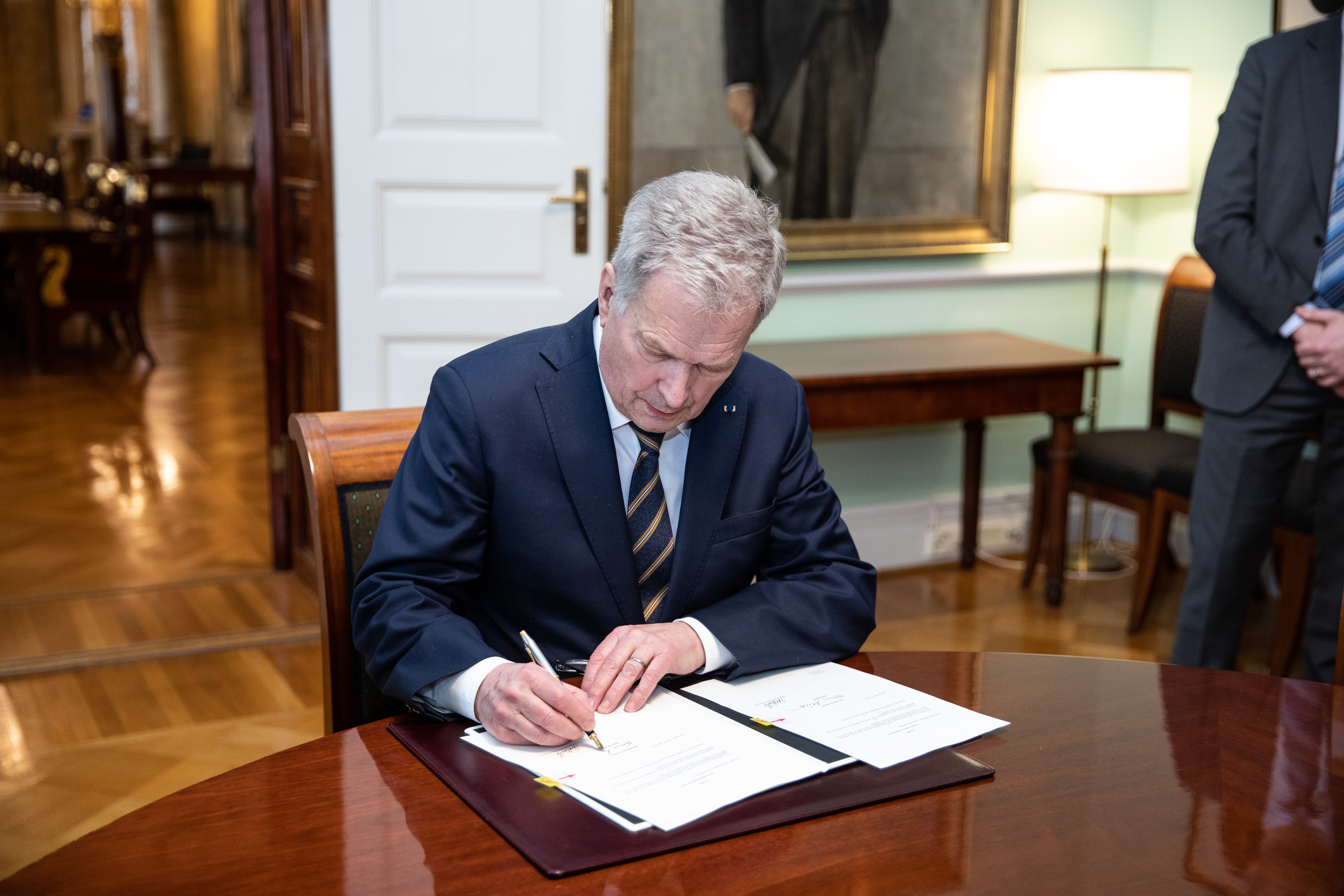
President of Finland Sauli Niinistö confirm the laws regarding Finland's NATO membership in 2023

After the dissolution of the Soviet Union in 1991 and the end of the Cold War, the Finno-Soviet Treaty of 1948 was replaced by a new bilateral treaty between Finland and the Russian Federation on a more equal footing, ending the Paasikivi-Kekkonen doctrine. Finland joined the European Union in 1995, adopting its Common Foreign and Security Policy. Since joining NATO's Partnership for Peace programme in 1994, cooperation with NATO has increased, including interoperability and participation in NATO missions.

Despite these changes, Finland initially remained militarily non-aligned and attempted to retain good relations with Russia. However, the 2022 Russian invasion of Ukraine caused a dramatic increase in public and political support in Finland for full membership in NATO. The application for membership was formally submitted on 18 May. President Joe Biden touted the change in Finnish foreign policy, saying on June 16, 2022 that Vladimir Putin "wanted the [...] Finland-ization of NATO. He got the NATO-ization of Finland, instead." After all 30 NATO members ratified the application, Finland became the 31st member of NATO on 4 April 2023. The notion of "end of Finlandization" has been applied both to the changing circumstances resulting from the end of the Cold War and to Finland's decision to join NATO.

== Finlandization in other countries ==
=== Ukraine ===
Ukraine has been seen as adhering to Finlandization due to its proximity to Russia. Until 2014, Ukraine officially identified itself as a non-aligned "non-bloc" nation. Under the presidency of Viktor Yanukovych, Ukraine remained neutral but pursued closer ties with Russia. Yanukovych signed into law a bill that prevented Ukraine from formally joining any military alliance, including NATO, while allowing cooperation. Following the outbreak of the Russo-Ukrainian War in 2014, and the subsequent annexation of Crimea by Russia, Ukraine renounced its neutral status; Petro Poroshenko, then-President of Ukraine, submitted a legislative amendment to join NATO in December 2014. This was seen as the end of Finlandization in Ukraine. Ukraine formally applied for NATO membership in September 2022.

Russia escalated the Russo-Ukrainian War by invading Ukraine in February 2022. As a result, it has been suggested that Ukraine re-adopt Finlandization to end the war. Former German Chancellor Olaf Scholz announced he opposes Ukrainian membership in NATO, calling on Ukraine to return to neutrality. Donald Trump's victory in the 2024 United States presidential election has raised concerns that a Trump administration may force Ukraine to accept a neutral, non-aligned Finlandization policy, due to Trump's intent to end the conflict as quickly as possible.

International responses to the Russian invasion of Ukraine have also reflected Finlandization from some countries, particularly in Asia. India did not formally condemn the invasion, owing in part to its history of positive relations with Russia. It was also noted that Bangladesh, Kazakhstan, Kyrgyzstan, Laos, Mongolia, Pakistan, Sri Lanka, Tajikistan and Vietnam did not have strong responses to the Russian invasion of Ukraine, "reflecting pressures from Russia and China."

=== Mongolia ===
Mongolia has been perceived as following a policy of Finlandization, due to its geographic location being surrounded by Russia and China. Since Mongolia is considered a buffer state between Russia and China and is dependent on the latter, Mongolian foreign policy tends to be neutral and avoid hostility towards China or Russia.

=== Taiwan ===
Some scholars have argued that Taiwan has developed a policy of Finlandization with China. Taipei City Councillor Hsu Chiao-hsin suggested that Taiwan could learn from Finland's policy of Finlandization in the Cold War era.
