= Army Ranger Wing =

Special operations force of the Irish Defence Forces

Coordinates: 53°08′50.8″N 6°49′47.4″W

Irish Army Ranger Wing
- Irish: Sciathán Fianóglach an Airm
- Shoulder flash and insignia of the Army Ranger Wing
- Active: 16 March 1980 – present
- Country: Ireland
- Branch: Irish Army
- Type: Special forces
- Role: Counterterrorism; Covert operation Hostage rescue Naval boarding Peacekeeping; Special operations Special reconnaissance
- Size: Classified
- Part of: Defence Forces
- Garrison/HQ: DFTC, Curragh Camp, County Kildare
- Nickname: Fiannóglaigh/Fianóglach
- Mottos: Glaine ár gcroí, Neart ár ngéag, Agus beart de réir ár mbriathar ("The cleanliness of our hearts, The strength of our limbs, And our commitment to our promise")
- Colours: Black, Red and Gold
- Engagements: UNOSOM II; INTERFET; UNPROFOR; UNFICYP; UNIFIL; MINURSO; UNMIL; MINURCAT; MINUSMA
- Website: www.military.ie/en/who-we-are/army/arw/

Insignia
- Green Beret
- Abbreviation: ARW

The Army Ranger Wing (ARW) (Irish: Sciathán Fianóglach an Airm, "SFA") is the special operations force of the Irish Defence Forces, the military of Ireland. It is a branch of the Irish Army, but it also selects personnel from the Naval Service and Air Corps. It serves at the behest of the Defence Forces and Government of Ireland, operating internally and overseas, and reports directly to the Chief of Staff.

The ARW was established in 1980 with the primary role of counterterrorism and evolved to both special operations and counterterrorism roles from 2000 after the end of conflict in Northern Ireland. The unit is based in the Curragh Camp, County Kildare. The 2015 White Paper on Defence announced that the strength of the ARW would be considerably increased due to operational requirements at home and overseas.

The unit has served abroad in a number of international peacekeeping and peace enforcement missions including in Somalia, East Timor, Liberia, Chad, and Mali. The ARW trains with special forces units around the world, particularly in Europe. The ARW in its domestic counter terrorism role trains and deploys with the Garda Síochána (national police) specialist armed intervention unit, the Emergency Response Unit (ERU).

In February 2022, the Commission on the Defence Forces report recommended that the ARW be renamed the Ireland Special Operations Force (IRL-SOF). The IRL-SOF would be placed under a Special Operations Command which would report directly to Joint Force Command. A follow up report released in November 2023, the Detailed Implementation Plan for the Report of the Commission of the Defence Forces, stated that the ARW is due to be renamed the IRL-SOF in 2028. The updated IRL-SOF is proposed to consist of three Task Groups: Land, Air and Maritime. By 2028, the Air and Maritime Task Groups are to be re-located to the Casement Aerodrome and the Haulbowline Naval base.

== Roles ==
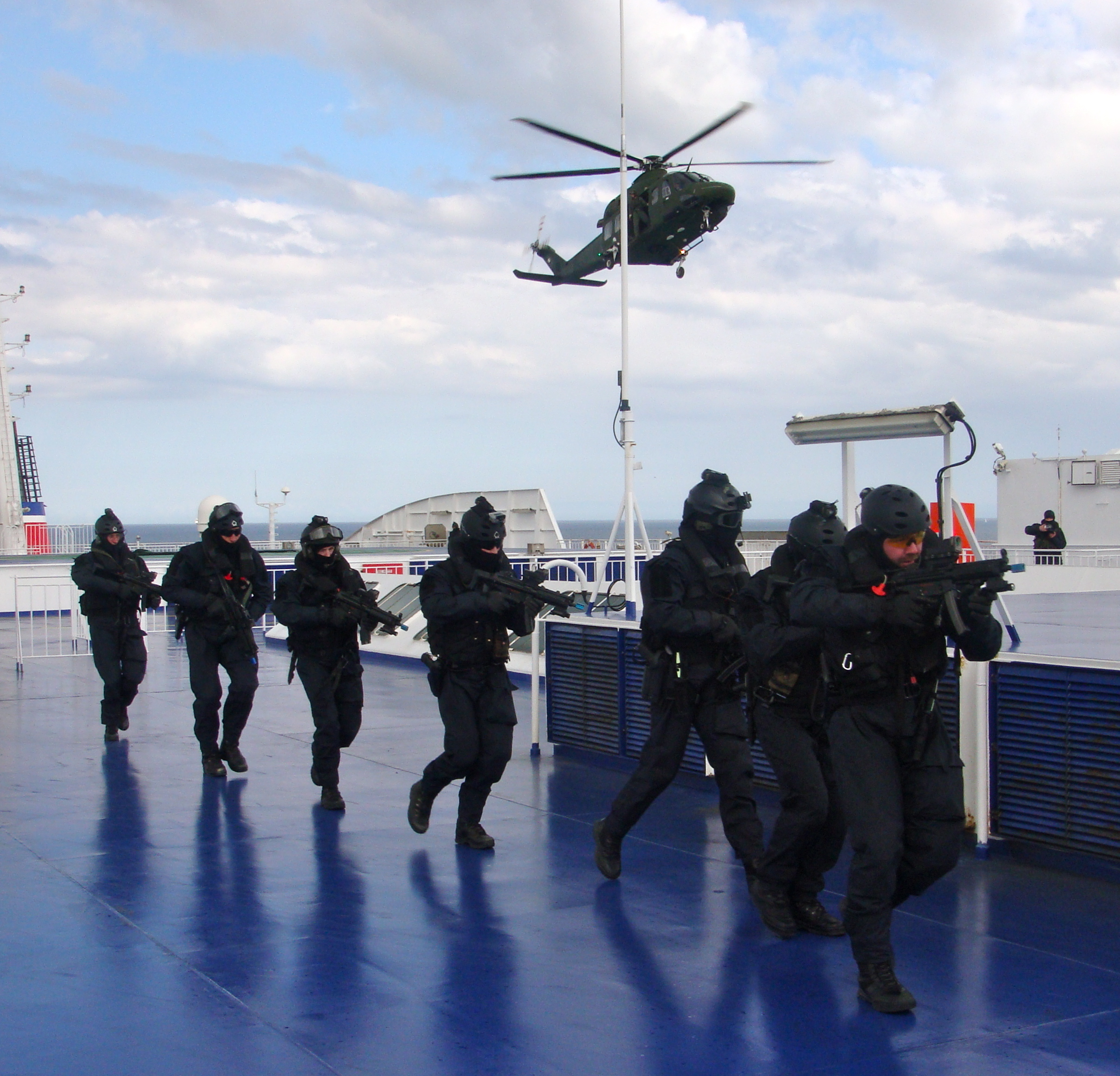
Rangers on a maritime counter-terrorism exercise in 2011

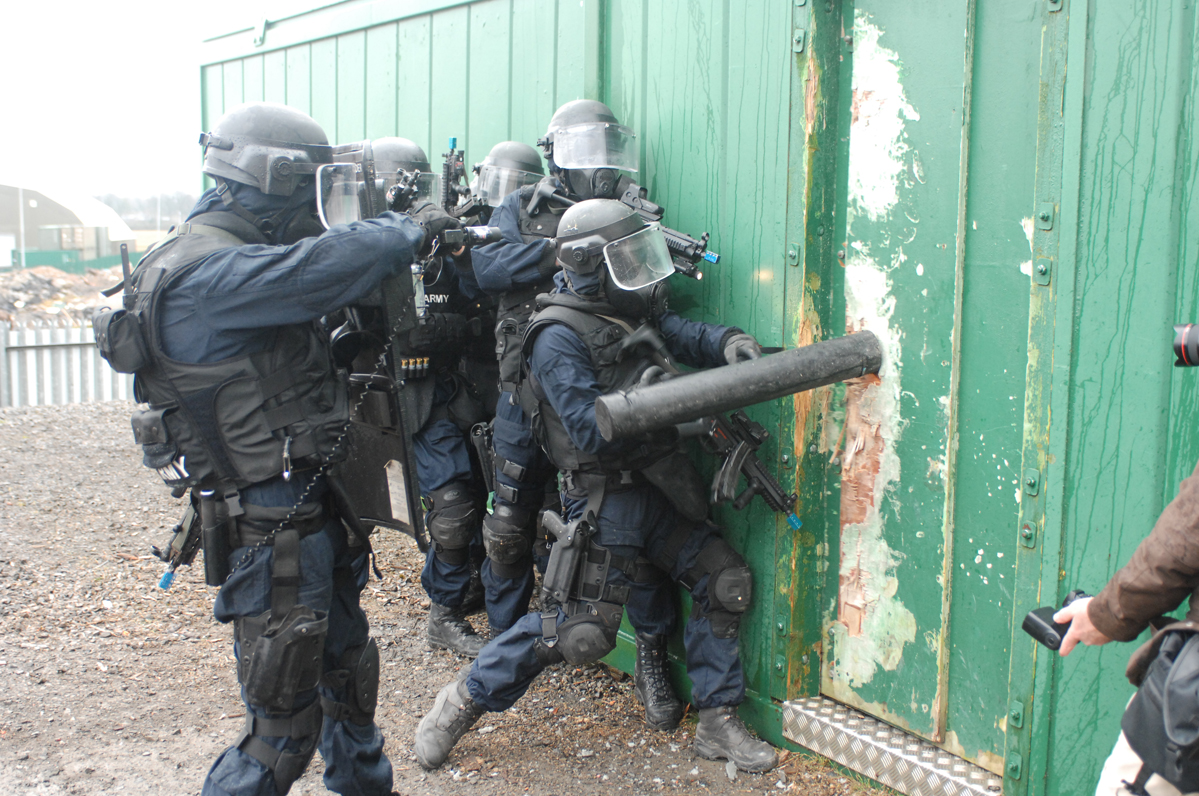
Rangers on a counter terrorism exercise in 2010

The Army Ranger Wing roles are divided between wartime special operations ("Green Role") and anti-terrorism ("Black Role"), the latter known formally as military Aid to the Civil Power (ATCP):

=== Military tasks (Green Role) ===
Offensive operations behind enemy lines

- Ambushes
- Capture or kill high-value targets
- Commando-style raids on military key targets (short-duration strikes or small-scale offensive actions)
- Diversionary operations
- Long-range reconnaissance patrol (LRRP)
- Military field intelligence gathering
- Sabotage
- Securing vital objectives

Defensive operations

- Counterinsurgency
- Delay operations
- Training in and conduct of black operations
- VIPs' protection.

=== Aid to the civil power tasks (Black Role) ===
- Airborne and seaborne interventions
- Anti-hijack operations
- Contingency planning to counter terrorist/subversive threats
- Executive protection
- Hostage rescue operations
- Pursuit operations
- Recapture of terrorist-held objectives
- Search and rescue operations - specialist tasks on land or sea

== Name and motto ==
The unit's official name in the Irish language is Sciathán Fianóglach an Airm. Fianóglach (representing "Ranger") is an amalgamation of two Irish words. Fiann means a roving warrior-hunter, usually used in the context of na Fianna, the legendary warrior-bands of Fionn mac Cumhaill from Irish mythology. Óglach literally means a young man or warrior, and is often translated in the Irish military context as volunteer (compare the official name of the Defence Forces in Irish, Óglaigh na hÉireann, which implies continuity with the Irish Volunteers). The shoulder flash insignia of the unit uses Fianóglach.

The motto of the Army Ranger Wing is taken from an old Fianna poem: Glaine ár gcroí, Neart ár ngéag, Agus beart de réir ár mbriatha, which translates as: "The purity of our hearts, the strength of our limbs and our commitment to our promise".

== History ==
In the late 1960s, the Defence Forces established 'Special Assault Groups' (SAG) in the Army to meet security challenges on the border with Northern Ireland. A number of Army officers attended the United States Army Ranger School in Fort Benning, Georgia who returned to conduct Army Ranger courses in Ireland with the first held in 1969. Among its founding officers was later-to-be Chief of Staff Lieutenant General Dermot Earley. Special Assault Groups were formed comprising 40 Rangers trained in all arms, engineering and ordnance techniques.

By the mid-1970s, the Defence Forces had over 300 Rangers who conducted support operations on the request of the Garda Síochána. Students on these courses were selected from among all ranks and units of the Army, Naval Service and Air Corps. The courses improved standards of physical endurance, marksmanship, individual military skills and small unit tactics. In December 1977, the Garda Síochána formed a counter-terrorist unit named the Special Task Force (STF) to operate in border regions that was later to become the Emergency Response Unit.

Following an assessment of the SAG, and Rangers receiving training from the M-Squadron, an elite counter-terrorism (CT) branch of the Royal Netherlands Marine Corps, in 1978 it was decided to consolidate the Rangers into a new special forces unit with a counter-terrorist capability following an increase in international and national terrorism, such as the 1972 Munich massacre in Germany (then West Germany) and a number of hostage-takings by the Provisional IRA (such as the Balcombe Street siege).

The Army Ranger Wing (ARW) was formally established, in accordance with the Defence Act, by Government order on 16 March 1980. The ARW received its colours in 1981; Black, Red and Gold, signifying Secrecy, Risk and Excellence. In 1991, the ARW was granted permission to wear the Green beret.

In April 2017, it was reported that there had been no increase in the strength of the ARW despite the 2015 White Paper's aim to considerably increase the strength of the unit.

On 16 January 2022, there were recommendations made for some ARW operators to be based in Cork to work alongside their colleagues in the Naval Service in improving its maritime anti-terrorism capabilities. In January 2022, the ex-ARW operator turned politician Cathal Berry said that he backed proposals to rename the unit as the 'Ireland Special Operations Force' (ISOF).

== Structure ==
The Officer Commanding the Army Ranger Wing is responsible for the administrative, disciplinary and operational control of the unit, and is in turn directly under the command of the Chief of Staff at Defence Forces Headquarters (DFHQ). Information on the numerical strength of the unit and the identity of its personnel is restricted. Estimates variously put the strength at "well over a hundred" or between 140 and 150 personnel. In 2015, the Defence White Paper announced an increase in strength with reports of the unit doubling in size. The Wing is divided into operational task units each comprising several assault teams relative to each operator's area of speciality. After serving one year in an assault team an operator can apply to join a specialist team such as combat diving team, free fall parachuting team and sniping team. An example of an operational task unit is the Special Operations Maritime Task Unit (SOMTU). Support elements provide expertise in bomb disposal, medical treatment, maritime and aviation operations. The Army Ranger Wing is headquartered at the Defence Forces Training Centre (DFTC) in the Curragh Camp, with Army Rangers required to live within a defined radius. Training is carried out nationwide at a number of Department of Defence properties, including Lynch Camp in Kilworth, County Cork.

The ARW is on immediate call 24/7, 365 days a year for operations throughout the state and abroad. The ARW is on 96 hours' notice to deploy overseas on special operations. The ARW is on a 1-hour alert for anti-terrorist operations to deploy anywhere on land in the Republic of Ireland using Air Corps aircraft and up to 200 miles out to sea via the Naval Service vessels. In the event of a major terrorist, hijacking or hostage incident, the ARW may be called to aid the Garda ERU, and in the past, they have been put on standby to assist the Irish Prison Service during major prison riots. The unit has on occasion been tasked for search and rescue (SAR) operations, as the ARW have trained Arctic survival specialists.

Besides sanctioned international military missions, the unit may be deployed overseas to protect Irish diplomatic missions and diplomats (particularly in times of war or civil unrest in host countries), to provide close protection to members of the Irish government travelling overseas, to rescue kidnapped Irish citizens, to extract citizens in hostile or conflict zones, or to conduct intelligence operations.

The ARW is equipped with SINCGAR ITT, Harris and Racal communications equipment, which have an inbuilt encryption and frequency-hopping systems. It is also equipped with satellite communications, through the ARW C3 (Command, Control & Communications) function and in cooperation with the Communications and Information Services Corps (CIS). This means ARW teams can communicate with their GHQ from anywhere in the world. The Army Ranger Wing Intelligence Section has the ability to remotely intercept electronic and telephonic communications, working with the Irish Military Intelligence Service (IMIS) and Army CIS Corps.

== Selection and training ==
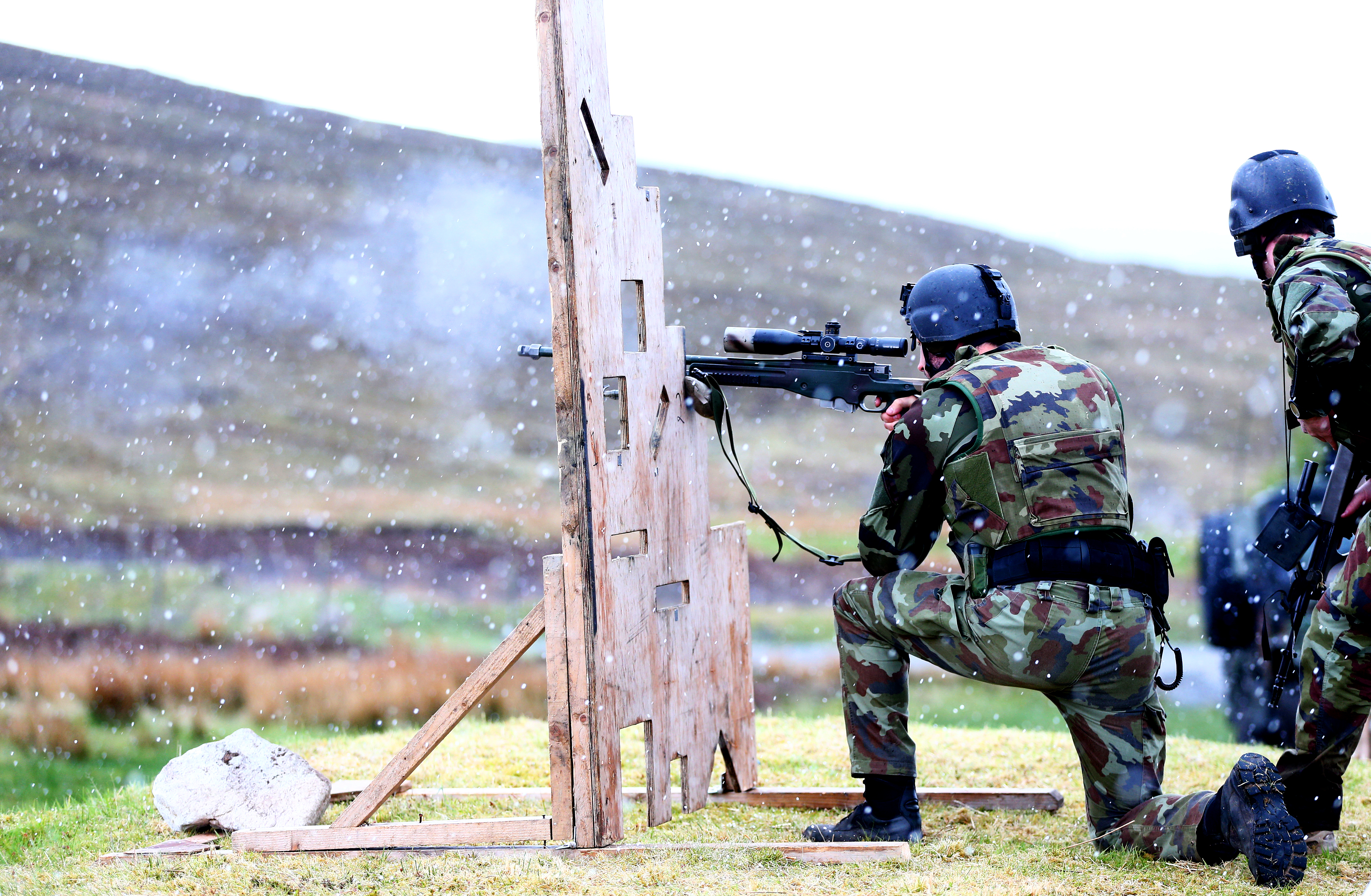
ARW sniper course in 2013

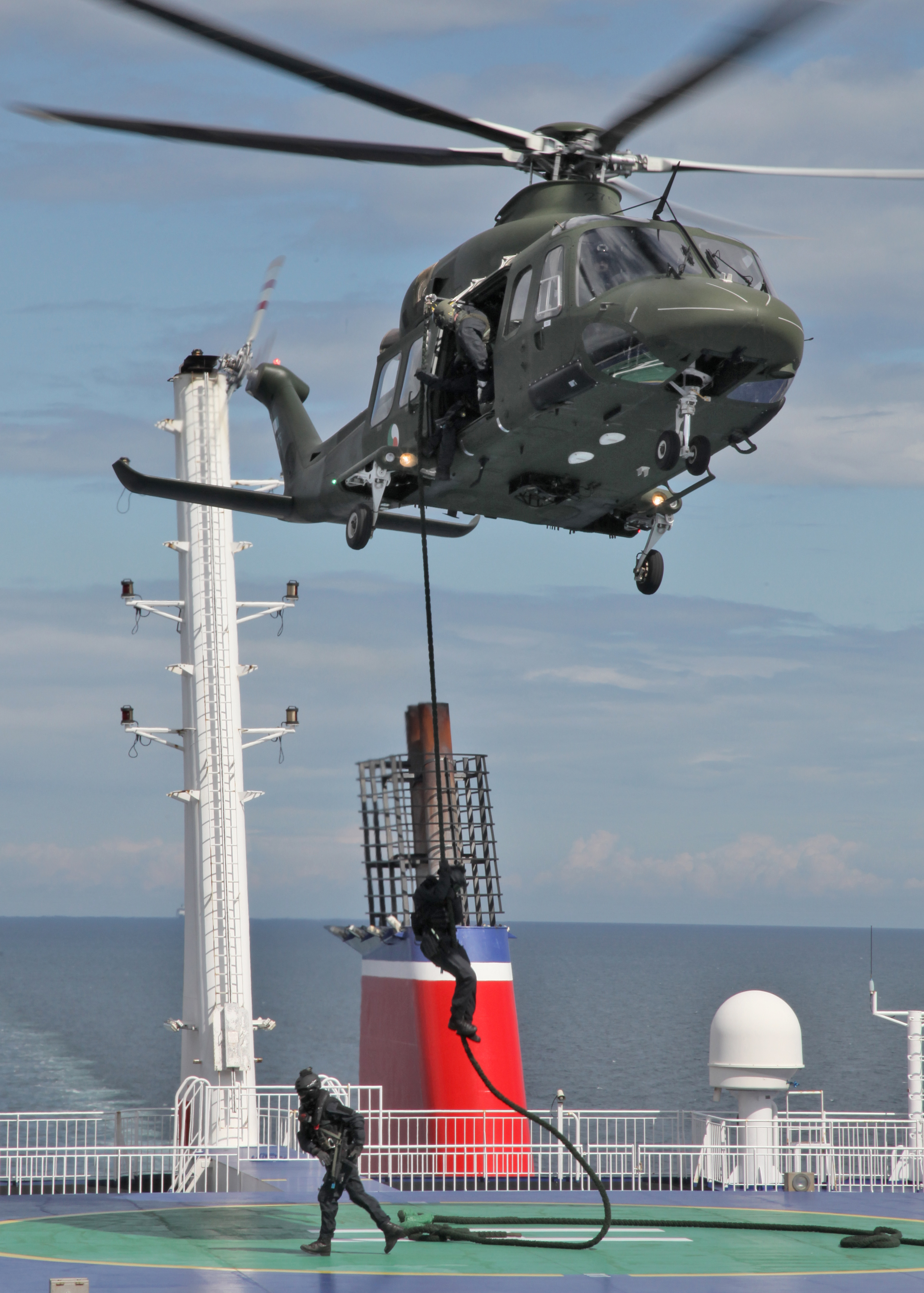
Rangers fast rope from an AW139 helicopter in a maritime counter-terrorism exercise on the Irish Sea in 2011

Candidates must be serving members of the Permanent Defence Forces (PDF) from any of the three branches (Army, Air Corps or Naval Service). The candidate must be medically fit and have attained the rank of at least 3 Star Private (or equivalent). There is no age limit to attempt selection, however a candidate is only allowed to attempt it three times. Candidates may fail 3 out of the 9 basic fitness tests however if they fail any of the psychological tests (such as fear of enclosed spaces) they will be expelled from selection and returned to unit. Selection has been open to females since 1984, however, none have been successful. Usually 40 to 80 candidates attempt selection annually.

The ARW recently revised its selection and assessment procedures combining the previous Selection course & Basic Skills course into a new single course named the Special Operations Force Qualification Course (SOFQ). The SOFQ is conducted over 10 months (40 weeks). The Selection Course had been conducted over 3 weeks after being reduced in 2006 from 4 weeks. The Basic Skills course had been conducted over 5 months.

The SOFQ is divided into 5 modules:

1. Assessment & Evaluation
2. Skills & Leadership
3. SOF Tactics, Techniques, and Procedures TTPs
4. Counter-Terrorism Tactics, Techniques, and Procedures TTPs
5. Continuation training

Module 1 assesses a candidate's level of physical fitness, motivation and suitability to progress on towards further modules (2–5) of the SOFQ course similar to the previous selection course. Candidates must pass a series of fitness assessments, map reading and individual navigation assessments, claustrophobia, water confidence, and psychometric testing. The final phase of Module 1 includes individual navigation exercises with set weights over unknown distances and completion times which can be over 250 km, culminating in an additional 65 km cross-country march carrying a 65 lb combat load in the Dublin & Wicklow mountain range. On average candidates get between four and five hours sleep per night. Officer and senior NCO candidates are subjected to separate, rigorous scrutiny of their planning and decision-making skills to determine their suitability. The length of Module 1 is 3 weeks similar to the previous selection course length. Typically 85% of candidates fail Module 1. Between 2000 and 2005, approximately 240 attempted selection, including a female, with 50 successful.

Modules 2 to 4 consist of assessment and training in weapons and marksmanship, live-fire tactical training, special operations tactics, techniques, and procedures (green role) and counter-terrorism tactics, techniques, and procedures (black role), combat water survival, Survival, Evasion, Resistance and Extraction (SERE), communications and medical training. Upon successful completion of Module 3, candidates are awarded the Fianóglach shoulder tab and are provisionally assigned to the unit. Upon successful completion of Module 4, candidates are awarded the distinctive ARW green beret.

Module 5 Continuation training is the conclusion of the SOFQ course, and candidates are posted to an operational ARW task unit as an assault team operator. 3 Star Privates (and equivalents) who are successful in completing the SOFQ course pass out at the rank of Acting Corporal, and the lowest commissioned rank in the unit is that of Captain. All candidates must successfully complete the basic parachute course of five (5) static line jumps from 3,000 feet using T10 round canopies.

As of 2012, it was reported that since the unit's inception fewer than 400 had completed training to become a Ranger.

Further specialist training courses for Rangers include advanced combat medical skills, military freefall, combat diving (taught by the specialist Naval Service Diving Section) and boat handling, close protection and handling of advanced weapons.

Prior to 2000 with The Troubles, approximately 85% of Ranger training had been dedicated to counter-terrorism. The average age of a Ranger is 31 years old with the eldest 44 years old. On average, a member of the ARW spends between 5 and 10 years serving with the unit before being returned to their home unit bringing their skills with them, but it is not uncommon for some to spend 15 years in the unit.

The ARW has its own purpose-built tactical training facilities, including shooting ranges, kill houses and various urban and rural settings. The main facility is known as "Tac Town", based in the Curragh. Other ranges are located in County Wicklow. These facilities are also made available to the ERU.

The ARW has trained with other military and law enforcement special operations forces, including;

- Australia – Special Air Service Regiment (SASR)
- Belgium – Special Forces Group (SFG)
- Canada – Joint Task Force 2 (JTF2) & Canadian Special Operations Regiment (CSOR)
- France – GIGN & 1er RPIMa
- Germany – GSG 9 & KSK
- Italy – GIS & COMSUBIN
- Netherlands – UIM
- New Zealand – New Zealand Special Air Service (NZSAS)
- Poland – JW GROM
- Sweden – SOG & FJS
- United Kingdom – Special Air Service (SAS)
- United States – 75th Ranger Regiment, Delta Force, Navy SEALs & Marine Corps Force Reconnaissance

The ARW and ERU train specifically for marauding terrorist firearms/explosive attacks.

In 2015, the Irish Defence Forces signed agreements with their British counterparts to deepen joint special forces peacekeeping co-operation, extending from previous deployments with British special forces in a number of combat zones.

== Notable missions ==
Rangers have seen active service in a number of peacekeeping missions around the world with the United Nations, European Union (EU) and Partnership for Peace (PfP) of the North Atlantic Treaty Organization (the Republic of Ireland is not a member of NATO, due to its policy of military neutrality). Individual deployments include Lebanon, Bosnia, Cyprus, Iraq and Western Sahara.

=== Somalia ===
The ARW's first deployment overseas was in Somalia in 1993 as part of UNOSOM II where a number of teams joined the United States-led peacekeeping coalition tasked with imposing a ceasefire in the Baidoa region. Over 100 Irish troops took part in the mission.

On one regular return journey, from protecting a food convoy/supply run to Mogadishu, Irish and Indian UN troops were ambushed by insurgents. Following an intense firefight, there were more than 10 enemies killed with no Irish or Indian fatalities reported. Following this, the Irish contingent was supplied with armoured vehicles as they had previously been relying on soft-skinned vehicles mounted with heavy calibre machine guns.

=== East Timor ===
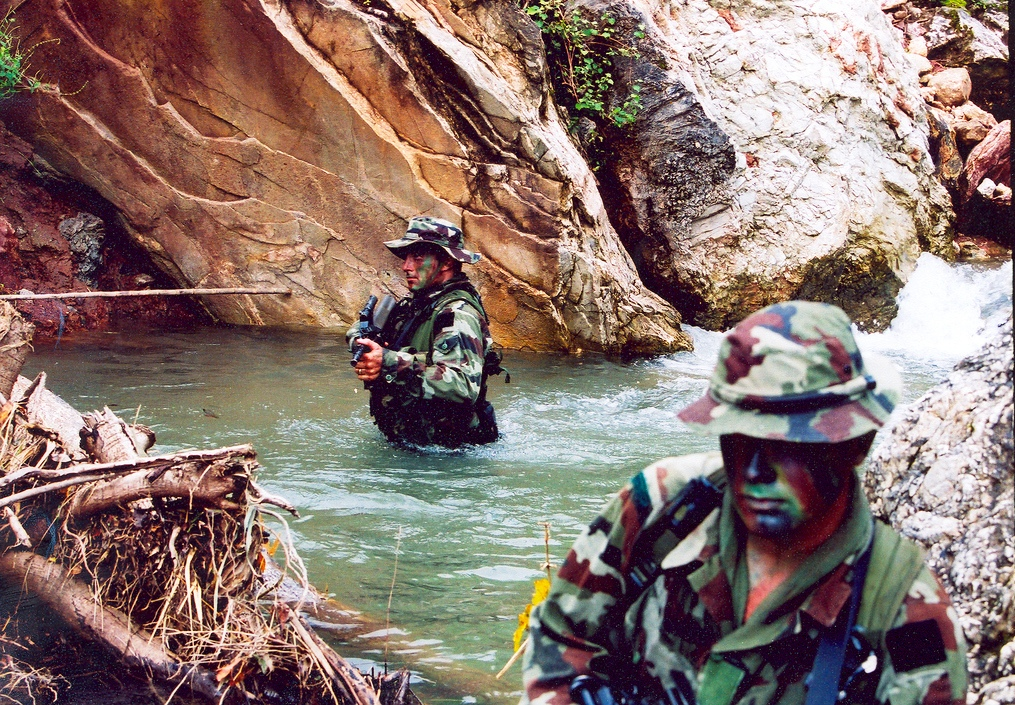
Rangers on a reconnaissance patrol in East Timor

In October 1999, No 1 IRCON (Irish Contingent), an ARW platoon of 30 Rangers deployed to East Timor as part of the International Force for East Timor (INTERFET) to restore peace and security following the independence referendum in August. The Australian-led mission had begun nearly a month earlier with an allied special forces coalition of Australian Special Air Service, New Zealand Special Air Service and British Special Boat Service (SBS) armed Response Force.

No 1 IRCON was embedded in the reconnaissance company in the 1st Battalion, Royal New Zealand Regiment (1 RNZIR) Battalion Group together with an infantry company from the Canadian 3rd Battalion, Royal 22 Regiment bringing the battalion to full strength. The Battalion Group based in Suai was responsible for securing the south-west of the country from pro-Indonesia militias and Indonesian soldiers that included a long section of the border between East and Indonesian controlled West Timor.

No 1 IRCON completed a four-month deployment followed by No 2 IRCON. In February 2000, INTERFET handed over command of military operations to the United Nations Transitional Administration in East Timor (UNTAET). No 2 IRCON completed its four-month deployment in June 2000 with subsequent rotations from infantry platoons. The Battalion Group had several contacts (firefights) and a number of incidents with threat forces sustaining no casualties.

=== Liberia ===
The ARW was deployed in Liberia in the aftermath of the Second Liberian Civil War as part of a peacekeeping contingent of more than 400 troops from the Irish Army, in turn, part of the mixed Irish-Swedish Force Reserve Battalion of the United Nations mission in the country, UNMIL (2003). The ARW's area of operations (AO) was "all of Liberia", consisting of 4.7 million people and 111,369 km^{2} (43,000 sq mi).

One of their most successful missions during this deployment was the rescue of a large group of civilians captured by gunmen from renegade Liberian forces. Acting on intelligence, a team of twenty heavily armed Rangers were dropped via helicopters at the town of "Gbapa". To avoid casualties among the hostages, the ARW implemented a policy of less-lethal intervention and, after surrounding a 40-foot container holding 35 hostages, rescued the innocent civilians and captured the rebel forces, including their commander. The incident, which resulted in no Irish casualties, drew praise from the international community and boosted the reputation of the ARW worldwide.

Ranger Sergeant Derek Mooney (33) of Dublin, was killed when his vehicle was involved in a motor vehicle accident during a transport convoy.

=== Chad and Central African Republic ===
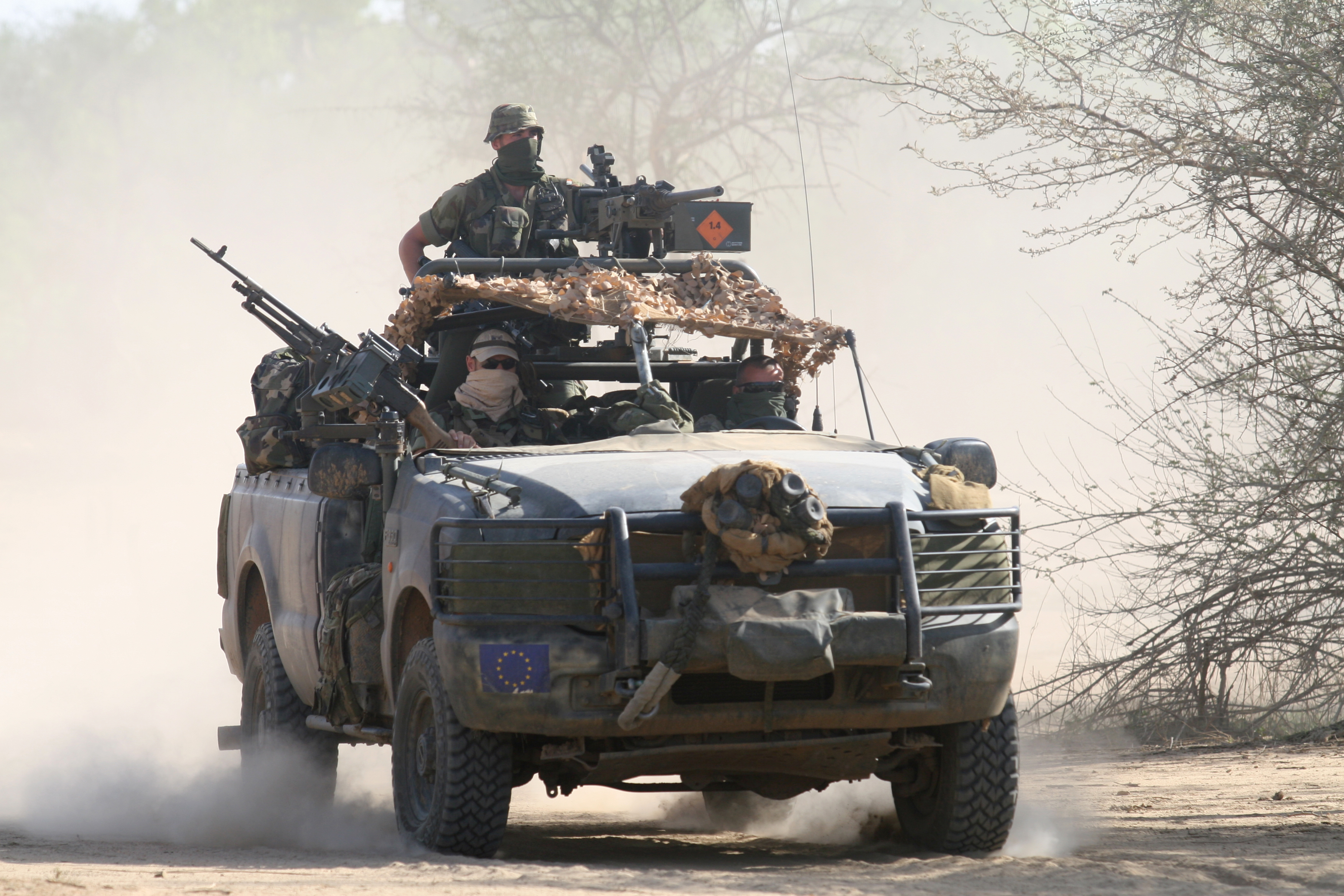
ARW vehicle patrol in Ford F-350 SRV in Chad in 2008

In February 2008, a Special Forces Task Group of 58 Rangers deployed to Abéché in Chad as part of the European Union Force Chad/CAR based at Camp Croci. The ARW was an Initial Entry Force together with other EUFOR special forces that conducted special reconnaissance within the Irish assigned south eastern Chad area of operations.

The ARW was later based at Multi-National Base-South at Goz Beïda known as Camp Ciara in the area of operations providing security during the construction of the base. The ARW conducted vehicle patrols along the Chad / Sudan border in their Ford F-350 Special Reconnaissance Vehicles. The ARW mission ended in June 2008 with the arrival of the 97th Infantry Battalion.

=== Mali ===
In June 2019, Dáil Éireann approved sending an ARW Task Unit and staff officers to the UN Multidimensional Integrated Stabilization Mission in Mali (MINUSMA) in intelligence and operational roles, on 4-month rotations for two years. The ARW were deployed in response to an upsurge in violence in north-eastern Mali, led by militants affiliated with al-Qaeda. The Irish contingent were primarily tasked with conducting long-range reconnaissance patrols (LRRP) and deployed as part of a German-led ISTAR Task Force, benefiting from the protections and medical support in place for the larger force. 14 ARW operators are reported to be involved per rotation.

MINUSMA is the most dangerous UN peacekeeping mission. As of October 2019, 204 peacekeepers had been killed out of a total of 15,000 deployed uniformed personnel. It is the first overseas operational deployment for the ARW as a unit, in ten years.

In February 2020, three ARW personnel were injured when an IED blast hit the armoured patrol vehicle they were travelling in, 70 km east of Gao. The personnel were airlifted to hospital but after two weeks were reported to be "back to work".

=== Overseas extraction operations ===
In October 2005, Rangers and Arabic-speaking intelligence officers from Military Intelligence (J2) were deployed to Baghdad, Iraq, following the abduction of Irish journalist Rory Carroll by al-Qaeda-affiliated militants. Following negotiations with Irish, British and American government representatives, Rory Carroll was released unharmed days later and returned safely to Ireland.

In 2009, the ARW were involved in the evacuation of GOAL aid worker Sharon Commins who was kidnapped by Janjaweed in Darfur, Sudan for more than 100 days before being released, although the government denied the involvement of the ARW at the time.

With the fall of Muammar Gaddafi in 2011 and the Libyan Civil War, the ARW, Air Corps and other Defence Forces assets were deployed in order to evacuate upwards of 115 Irish citizens from the country, mainly via the capital Tripoli. The ARW operated out of the British diplomatic mission in Malta. It was reported at the time that Irish officials printed fake boarding passes in order to bypass "tight" security at Tripoli airport, where authorities refused to allow a large number of aircraft to land or take off. Three Irish aircraft were involved in the operation.

In October 2019 it was reported that the ARW were deployed to the Syrian border to extract Lisa Smith - a former Irish Army soldier who converted to Islam before fleeing Ireland to join ISIS - and her two-year-old child in a Non-Combatant Evacuation Operation (NEO) after the 2019 Turkish offensive into north-eastern Syria resulted in Kurdish-held ISIS prisoners escaping, including Smith, although the Defence Forces or Irish government did not confirm this. ARW personnel were in plainclothes and "discreetly armed" for protection purposes. Smith was repatriated to Dublin Airport where she was arrested by Gardai and charged with terrorism offences.

On 23 August 2021 in the aftermath of the Fall of Kabul to the Taliban, Minister for Foreign Affairs and Defence Simon Coveney approved the deployment of an Emergency Consular Assistance Team (ECAT) comprising ARW personnel and a small team of DFA diplomats to Hamid Karzai International Airport in Kabul in order to evacuate Irish citizens. The options available to the Irish government to extract its citizens were hampered by Ireland's lack of an organic strategic airlift capability. The mission ended on 26 August, just 48 hours after the team touched down in Kabul and resulted in the evacuation of 26 Irish citizens. It was reported the last members of the ECAT team left minutes after a deadly suicide bombing at Kabul airport.

In April 2023, a team of up to 12 ARW were deployed to Sudan as part of the evacuation of foreign nationals during the 2023 Sudan conflict. ARW and DFA personnel travelled to Sudan via Djibouti to link up with and extract Irish citizens. The ARW provided medical & security support, secure communications and an intervention element.

=== Other overseas missions ===
During the War in Afghanistan, ARW personnel served in small numbers with ISAF and RSM from October 2006 to March 2007 and from September 2014 to March 2015, mainly as trainers, medical staff and IED experts.

From 2006 to 2014, it has been reported that operatives from the ARW, including from the Intelligence Section and Military Intelligence Directorate, had been on the ground in Afghanistan, Iraq, Syria, Lebanon, Israel, Sudan, Ivory Coast, Liberia, Kosovo and Bosnia-Herzegovina as part of various international missions.

In 2012, it was reported that the ARW could deploy 30 Rangers in the Gulf of Aden, subject to Government, Dáil and UN approval ("triple-lock"), to protect international shipping lanes against Somali pirates as part of the EU's Operation Atalanta.

As of 2014, Rangers were serving missions on three continents, including training foreign forces in Africa and the Balkans, protection duties in Lebanon for the United Nations mission and security and intelligence operations on the Israeli-Syrian border (Golan Heights).

In late 2015, Private John O'Mahony (Ret.) gave evidence as a witness in a military trial in Beirut, Lebanon against Mahmoud Bazzi, a former Lebanese militia fighter accused of murdering Private Thomas Barrett and Private Derek Smallhorne of the Irish Army in April 1980 in Southern Lebanon (see At Tiri Incident). O'Mahony was accompanied during his entire time in Lebanon by a Close Protection Team from the Army Ranger Wing.

The ARW was chosen to spearhead the special operations task group (SOTG) for the EU Battlegroup rapid reaction force based in Germany, deploying in late 2019. It was the fourth time the Irish Defence Forces served in the Battlegroup, but the first time the ARW have as a unit. The wider force comprises 1,500 troops from EU member states. The ARW trained with the battlegroup for six months after which they remained on standby with it for 18 months. This overlapped with the unit's rotations to MINUSMA in Mali.

=== Reported domestic missions ===
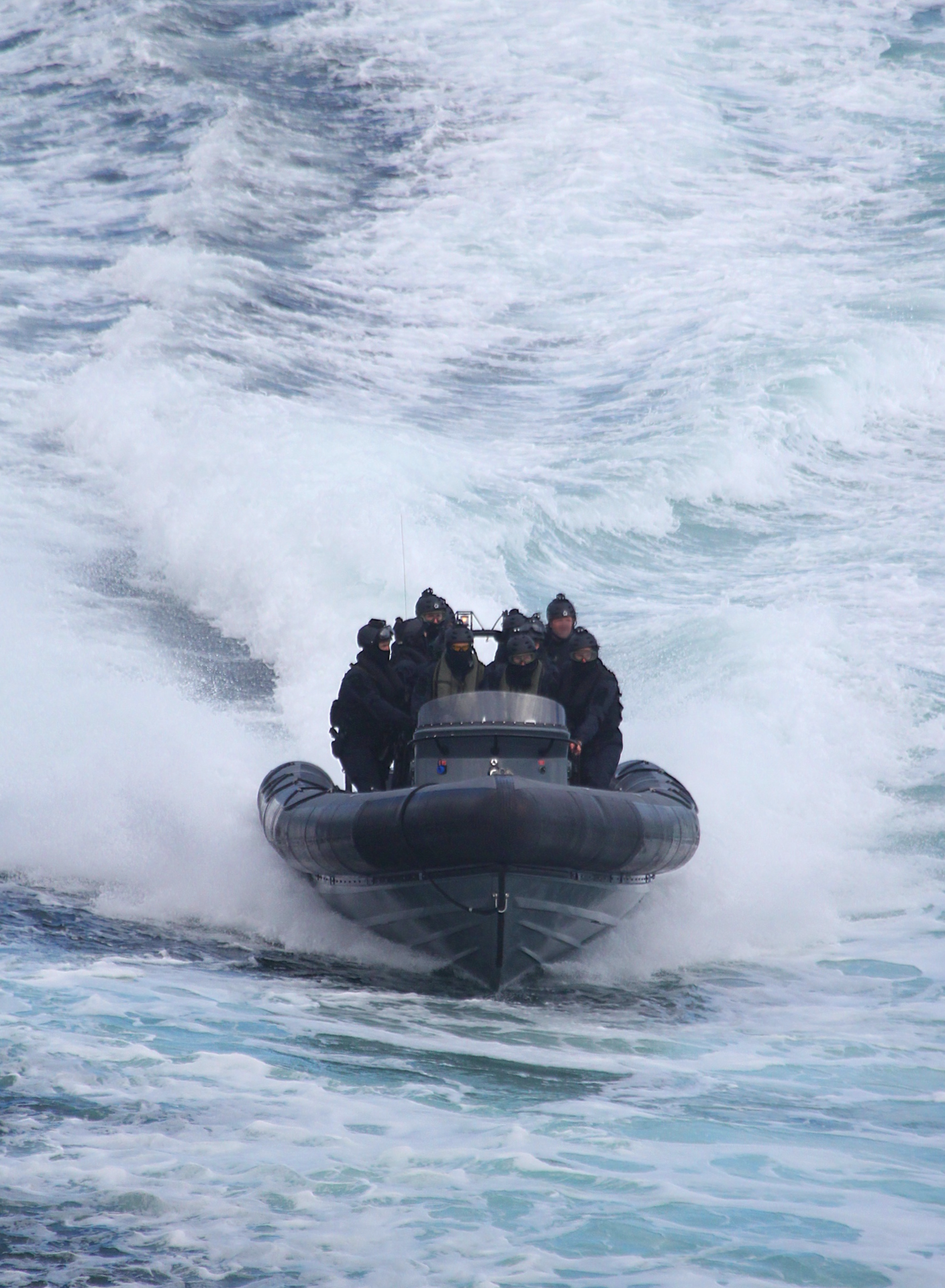
ARW maritime counter-terrorism exercise on the Irish Sea in 2011

In December 1983, the ARW was involved in an operation against a Provisional IRA "unit" on the loose in woodland in the South of County Leitrim. The group had been holding kidnapped businessman Don Tidey hostage for ransom. The ARW had been sent to assist the search effort, and were reported to have covertly swept areas of interest using night-vision goggles while armed with the Heckler & Koch MP5.

In the early 1990s, the ARW took part in operations in support of the Garda Emergency Response Unit against the Provisional IRA.

In January 1997, two teams of 12 from the ARW were sent to Mountjoy Prison in central Dublin, where three prisoners armed with knives had taken two prison officers hostage and barricaded themselves inside the Medical Unit where they were threatening to kill the prison officers. The ARW took up positions ready to blow down the steel door to the unit and eliminate the threat posed by the hostage-takers. The siege ended within a few hours of the ARW being called in after the hostage-takers were made aware of their presence during negotiations and surrendered.

In May 2011, the unit had a major role in protecting Queen Elizabeth II on her state visit to Ireland, where "viable" assassination attempts by dissident republican terrorists were prevented. The ARW had airborne sniper teams in three AgustaWestland AW139 helicopters, counter assault teams in the motorcade and a number of ground teams, including 20 close protection officers.

Also in May 2011, President of the United States Barack Obama received protection from the ARW on his visit to Ireland just days after the visit of the Queen. The two visits were the largest civil security operations ever undertaken in the Republic of Ireland, both ultimately successful.

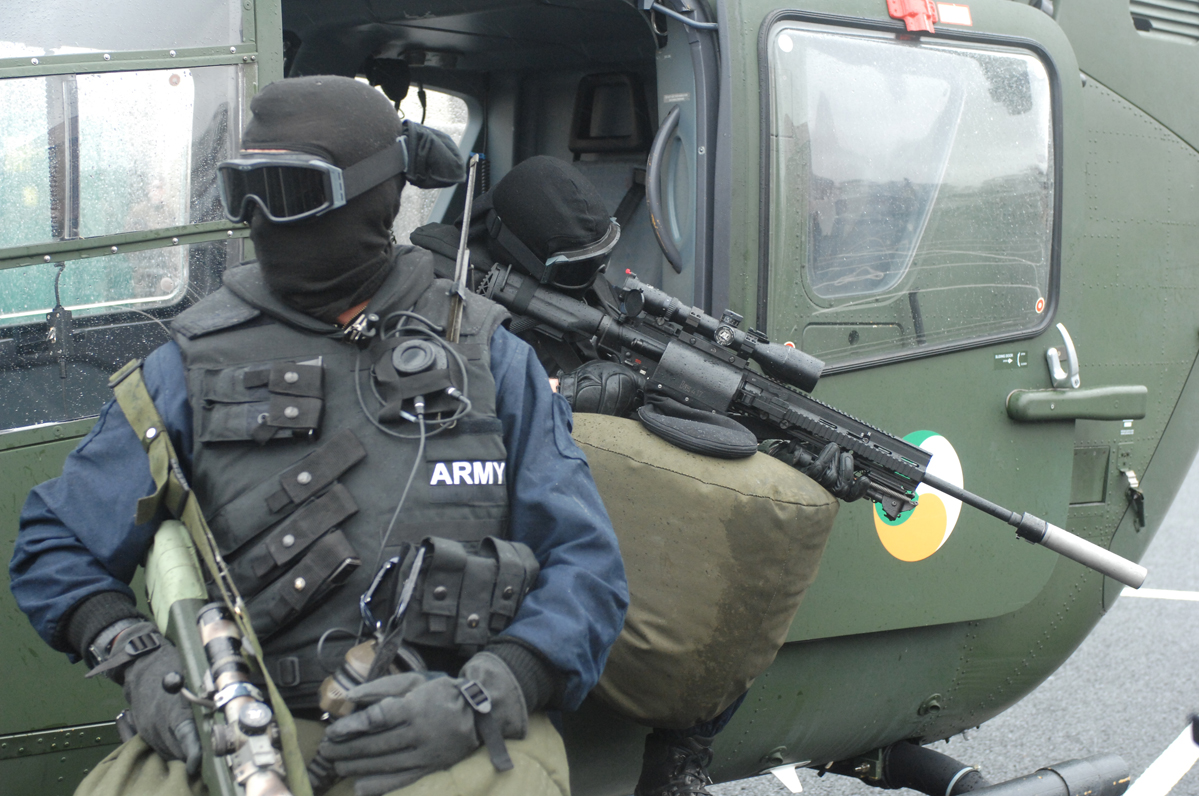
ARW sniper team onboard an Air Corps Eurocopter EC135 in 2010

From January to July 2013, the wing formed part of the security apparatus for the Presidency of the Council of the European Union, held by Ireland for six months, which included supplying sniper and spotter teams. Also in June 2013, they helped secure the Republic of Ireland–United Kingdom border on land and at sea as part of the security operation for the 39th G8 summit in Northern Ireland.

In the early morning of 26 September 2023, an ARW Maritime Task Unit was involved in the storming of MV Matthew, a Panamanian-registered bulk cargo vessel, off the coast of Cork in what was described as an "opposed boarding operation". The ship had crossed the Atlantic from Venezuela; approximately 2,200 kilograms of cocaine with an estimated street value of €157 million were found hidden on board the next day, in the largest seizure of illegal narcotics in Irish history. The ship, which had been monitored after entering Irish territorial waters, reportedly refused orders to halt for inspection and headed for international waters when warning shots were fired by the LÉ William Butler Yeats. This was followed by ARW maritime operators fast roping onto the vessel from an Irish Air Corps helicopter. After the ship was secured, it was escorted into Cork Harbour for further investigation. The 25 crew members detained for interview, with nine people arrested (of whom one was released) as of 30 September.

== Casualties ==
Three Rangers are known to have died while serving in the unit since its foundation in 1980, one of them overseas. Sergeant Derek Mooney, aged 33, of Blackrock, Dublin, died after the Land Rover Defender he was driving in a convoy overturned due to poor road conditions, 40 km south of Monrovia, Liberia on 27 November 2003. Sgt Kevin Mayne (1987) and RQMS Patsy Quirke (1998) also lost their lives while serving in the unit, however no details regarding the cause of their deaths are publicly available. No other losses have been publicly disclosed.

In Paul O'Brien and Wayne Fitzgerald's book Shadow Warriors, it states "four operatives losing their lives while on active service" with the ARW, however, their names and details are omitted at the request of the Irish Defence Forces. They are remembered on a memorial located within the ARW compound at the Curragh Camp.

== Equipment ==
=== Weapons ===
In addition to standard weapons of the Irish Defence Forces, weapons used by the ARW include:-

==== Personal weapons ====
Name	Origin	Type	Caliber	Photo	Notes
Pistols
SIG Sauer P226	Germany; Switzerland	Semi-automatic pistol	9×19mm Parabellum		
SIG Sauer P228	Germany; Switzerland	Semi-automatic pistol	9×19mm Parabellum		
Heckler & Koch USP	Germany	Semi-automatic pistol	9×19mm Parabellum		Suppressed
Submachine guns
FN P90	Belgium	Personal defense weapon	FN 5.7×28mm		
Heckler & Koch MP5	Germany	Submachine gun	9×19mm Parabellum		Including MP5A3, MP5SD6, MP5F and MP5K variants
Combat shotguns
Benelli M3T (Tactical)	Italy	Semi-automatic shotgun	12 gauge		
Benelli M4 Super 90	Italy	Semi-automatic shotgun	12 gauge		
Franchi SPAS-12	Italy	Combat shotgun	12 gauge		
Remington Model 870	United States	Pump action	12 gauge		
Assault rifles/Carbines
Heckler & Koch HK416	Germany	Assault rifle	5.56×45mm NATO		HK416 A5 in 11" and 14.5" variants.
Steyr AUG A1	Austria	Bullpup assault rifle	5.56×45mm NATO		
Steyr AUG A3	Austria	Bullpup assault rifle	5.56×45mm NATO		
Sniper rifles
Heckler & Koch HK417	Germany	Battle rifle	7.62×51mm NATO		Suppressed
Accuracy International Arctic Warfare Magnum	United Kingdom	Bolt action sniper rifle	.338 Lapua Magnum		
Accuracy International AW50	United Kingdom	Bolt action sniper rifle	12.7×99mm NATO		
Light machine guns
FN Minimi	Belgium	Light machine gun	5.56×45mm NATO		Para

==== Support weapons ====
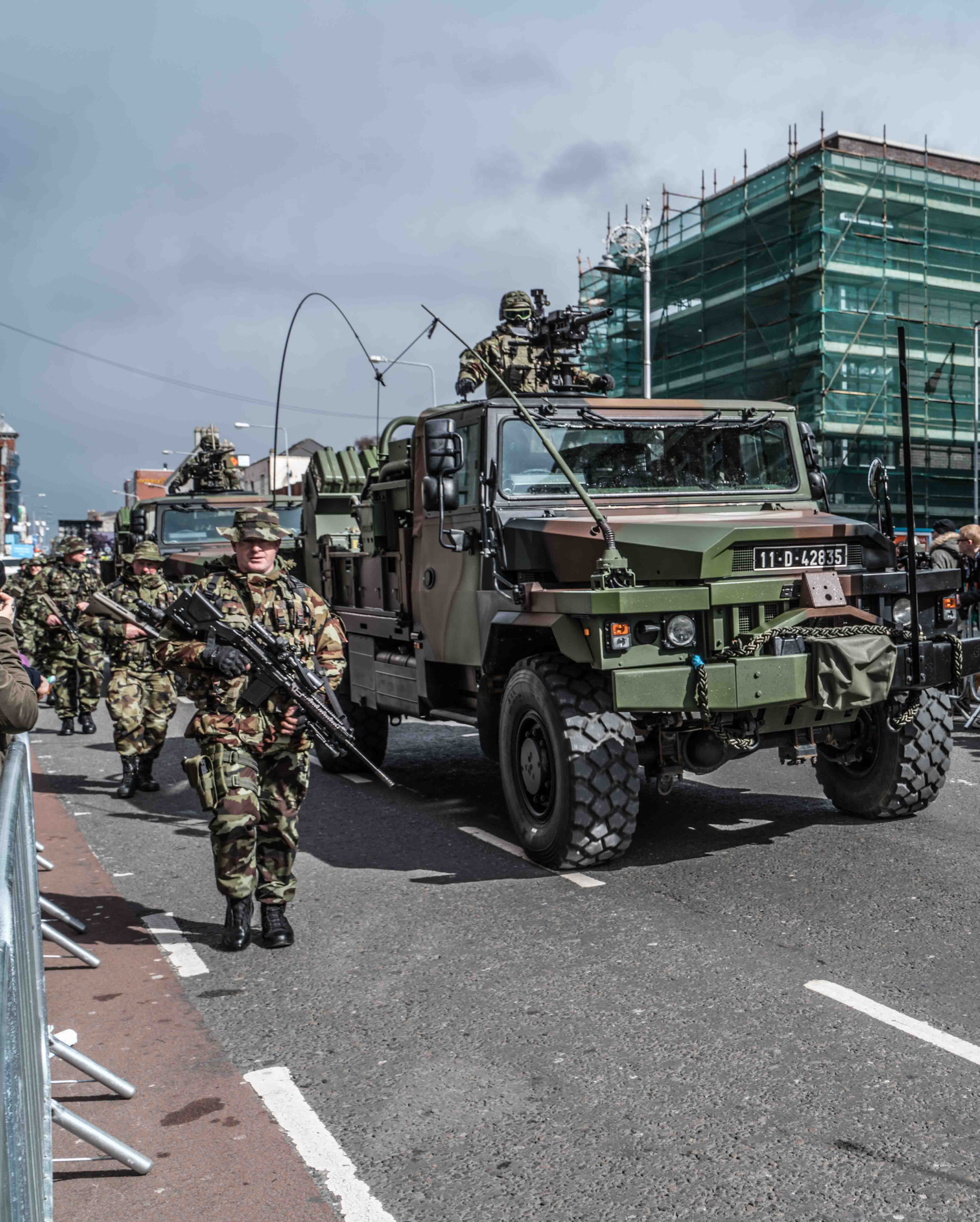
ACMAT VLRA used by the ARW as a 'mothership' to resupply Ford F-350 SRV

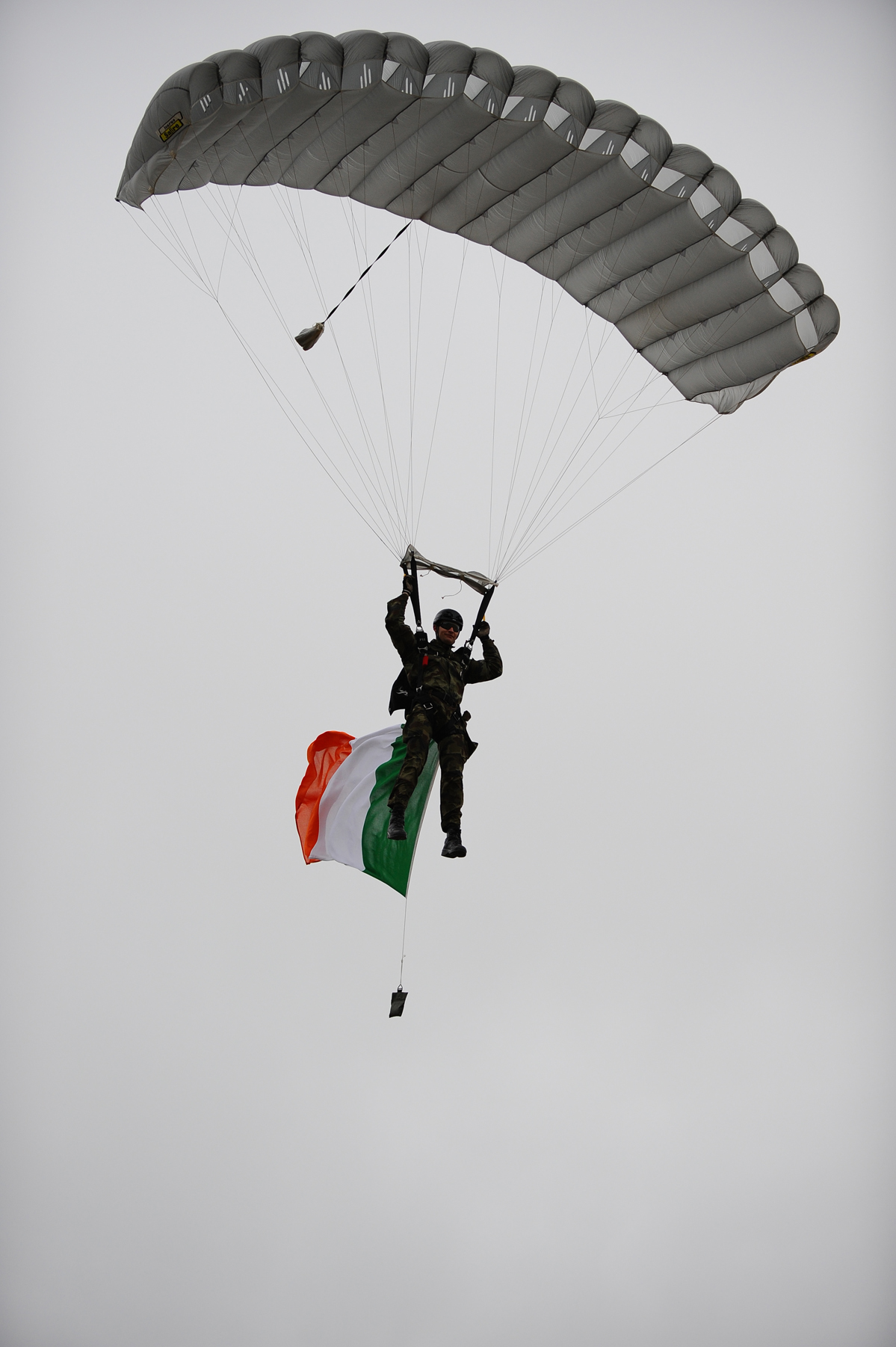
Ranger parachuting for ARW 30th Anniversary in 2010

- M203 grenade launcher
- Denel Vektor M1 60mm Mortar Commando mortar
- Carl Gustav 84mm recoilless rifle – including M2 and M3 variants
- AT4 Short Range Anti-Armour Weapon
- Raytheon Javelin Anti-tank guided missile

==== Vehicle-mounted weapons ====
- FN 7.62mm GPMG
- Browning M2 heavy machinegun .50cal
- Heckler & Koch GMG 40mm automatic grenade launcher

=== Specialised equipment ===
Terrain vehicles

- 13 x Ford F-350 Special Reconnaissance Vehicle (SRV) - WMIK (Weapons Mount Installation Kit) by Ricardo Engineering
- 3 x ACMAT VLRA tactical support vehicle (to re-supply SRV)
- Nissan Navara (tactical assault vehicle)
- Nissan Patrol (armoured)
- Ford Ranger (T6)
- Mitsubishi Pajero
- Range Rover (modified for counter-terrorism duties)
- Yamaha 660 All-terrain vehicles
- KTM motorcycles
- Suzuki DR350 and DR-Z400 motorcycles

Watercraft

- Dräger LAR VII Rebreather
- STIDD Diver Propulsion Device (DPD)
- Klepper MK13 kayak
- Nautiraid Mark VI kayak
- Zodiac M9 inflatable boat
- Combat Rubber Raiding Craft
- Rigid-Hulled Inflatable Boats (RHIBs) (Delta 7 metre, Lencraft 5.1 metre dive, and Lencraft 7.5 & 6.5 metre intruder RIBs)

Parachuting

- High-altitude military parachuting (HALO) & (HAHO) equipment
- AFF rig Xerox Initial training rig
- SOV/MMS-360 advanced MFF training rig
- SOV/MMS Silhouette operational 1 man/ Tandem sigma 2 man HALO/HAHO rig

== See also ==
- Naval Service Diving Section (NSDS) – Diving unit of the Irish Naval Service
- Garda Emergency Response Unit (ERU) – Unit of the Irish national police
