= ACMAT VLRA =

French tactical vehicle

The ACMAT VLRA (Véhicule de Liaison de Reconnaissance et d'Appui or Liaison, Reconnaissance, and Support Vehicle), a tactical vehicle produced by ACMAT, was launched during 1967, it was characterised by its robustness. It could transport 2.5 tonnes of payload, a maximum range of 1,600 km and a water tank with a capacity of 200lt. Known for their reliability, simplicity, ruggedness and their 80% (over 3,500) commonality of parts across the entire product line, these vehicles were originally targeted at African and Asian countries who could not afford more expensive vehicles. The ACMAT company built their vehicles based on standardisation, commonality of parts and components, and on interchangeability; parts are interchangeable with vehicles built 30 years ago. Parts commonality includes cabs, structural components, engines and drive trains. ACMAT uses many of the same parts for all of its line of vehicles. They even produce an armoured variant of both the 4x4 and 6x6 versions of the VLRA.

== Variants ==
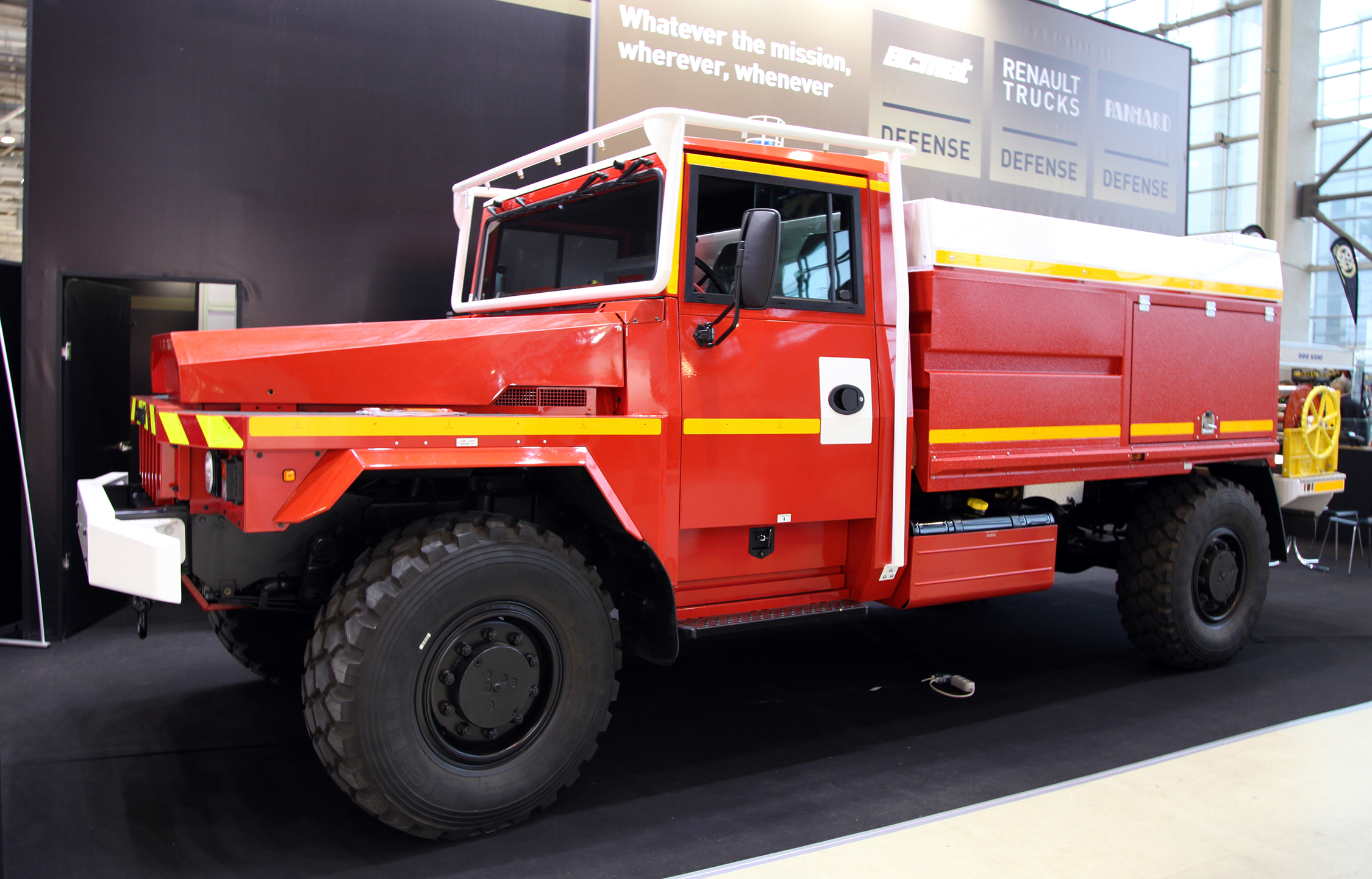
ACMAT VLRA 2 fire appliance

ACMAT offers over 70 VLRA variants including the following: command car, commando vehicle, police vehicles, personnel carriers, cargo carriers, ambulances, mortar carrier, weapons carriers, communications vehicles, cross country bus, wireless vehicle, workshops vehicles, vehicles with cranes, fire fighting vehicles, fluid carriers (water and/or petroleum products), Semi-trucks, multiple rocket launcher carriers, dump trucks and more.

Options include: two or four doors, soft or hard top, manual or power steering, manual or automatic transmission, left or right hand drive, heater, air conditioning, armoured or unarmoured, and NBC defence system.

== Versions ==
=== 4×4 logistics range ===
- TPK 420 VCT command and transmission station vehicle
- TPK 436 SCM loading and handling vehicle with multifunction platform and hydraulic crane at the rear of the cabin (capacity 3,000 kg at 6.60 m - rotation 200°)
- TPK 420 SL7 recovery vehicle with rapid intervention hydraulic excavator
- TPK 425 SAM ambulance with van measuring 3.307 × 2.20 × 1.675 m (transports 4 injured people)
- TPK 430 F van vehicle: maintenance workshop, mechanical or electrical repair, 1st and 2nd echelons, etc.; command post vehicle
- TPK 432 SB all-road bus carrying 28 people (short chassis) or 34 people (long chassis)
- TPK 433 SB bus command post or wounded transport version

=== 6×6 range ===
- TPK 635 SL7 recovery vehicle
- TPK 640 WRT vehicle Wrecker 5 t - Hydraulic crane 30 t/m
- TPK 641 GBS tipper vehicle - Loading and handling crane 7.2 t/m

=== Light reconnaissance and support vehicle ===
- TPK 415 SM3/FSP patrol vehicle
- TPK 420 SM3 VLRA TPK 420 STL multifunction vehicle. Flat platform 2.90 m long, folding and removable side panels
- TPK PMB mortar carrier vehicle, firing on board
- TPK 425 STL/SH multifunctional vehicle
- TPK 436 STL/SH

=== Multi-function vehicle for transporting personnel and/or equipment ===
- TPK 640 SM3 personnel or material transport vehicle
- TPK 640 CTL multi-function troop transport vehicle for 18 people. Weapon mounting capability, 12.7 mm mount, Milan, etc.
- TPK 641 VPC 6-seater double cabin vehicle. Special AR platform supporting 20mm twin-tube cannon. Shooting on board the vehicle
- TPK 650 SH/STL shelter door vehicle ACMAT

=== All-terrain semi-trailer and semi-trailer tractor vehicle 6×6 ===
- TPK 635 TSR tractor vehicle semi-trailer
- TPK 635 TSR 3 EC tractor vehicle with deep cabin SR 490 semi-trailer
- TCM 420 BL6 armored reconnaissance and command liaison vehicle

== Gallery ==
First Generation gallery

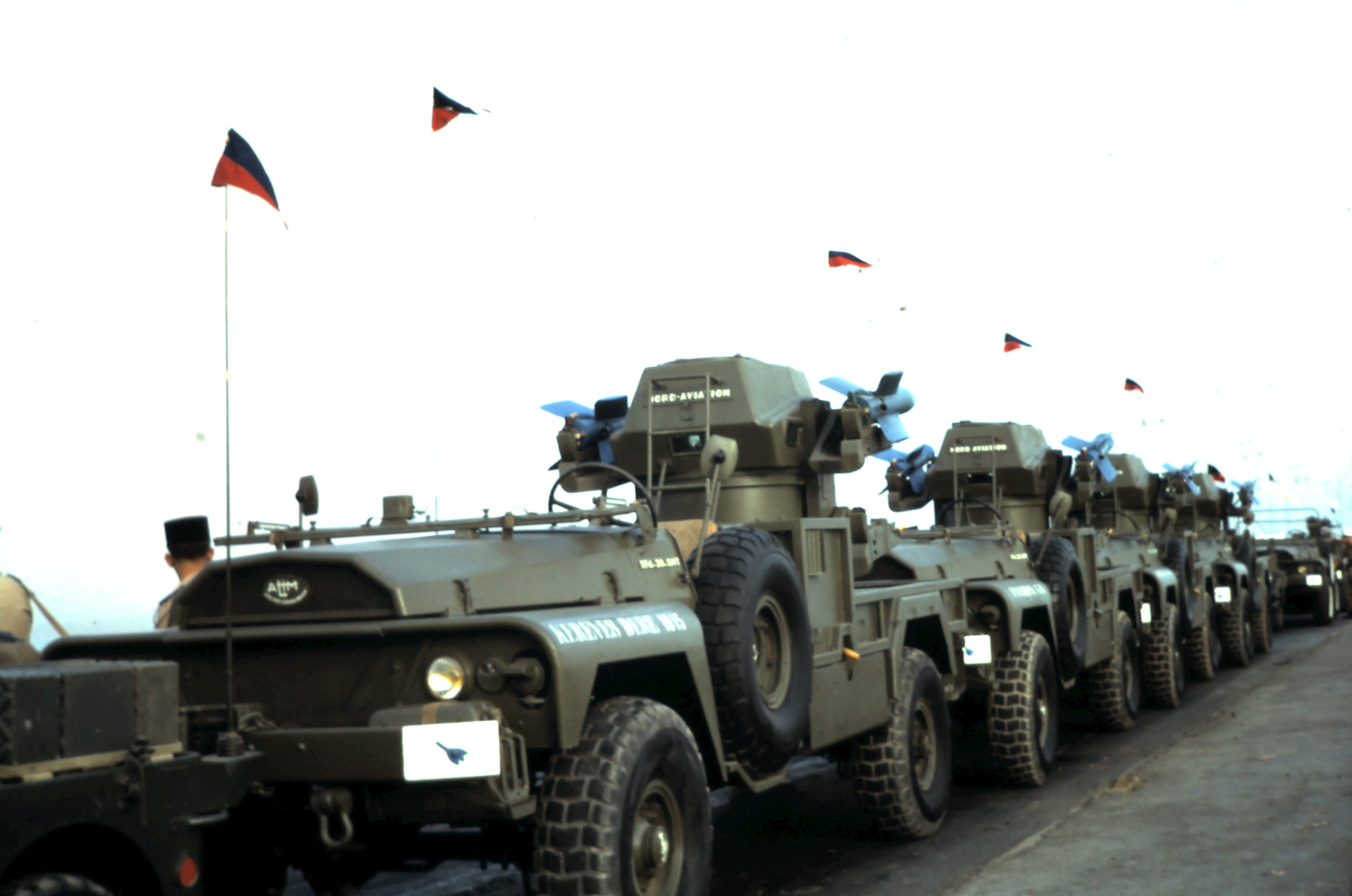
Five VLRA SS 11 missile launchers were put into service in the early 1970s in the French Territory of the Afars and the Issas.

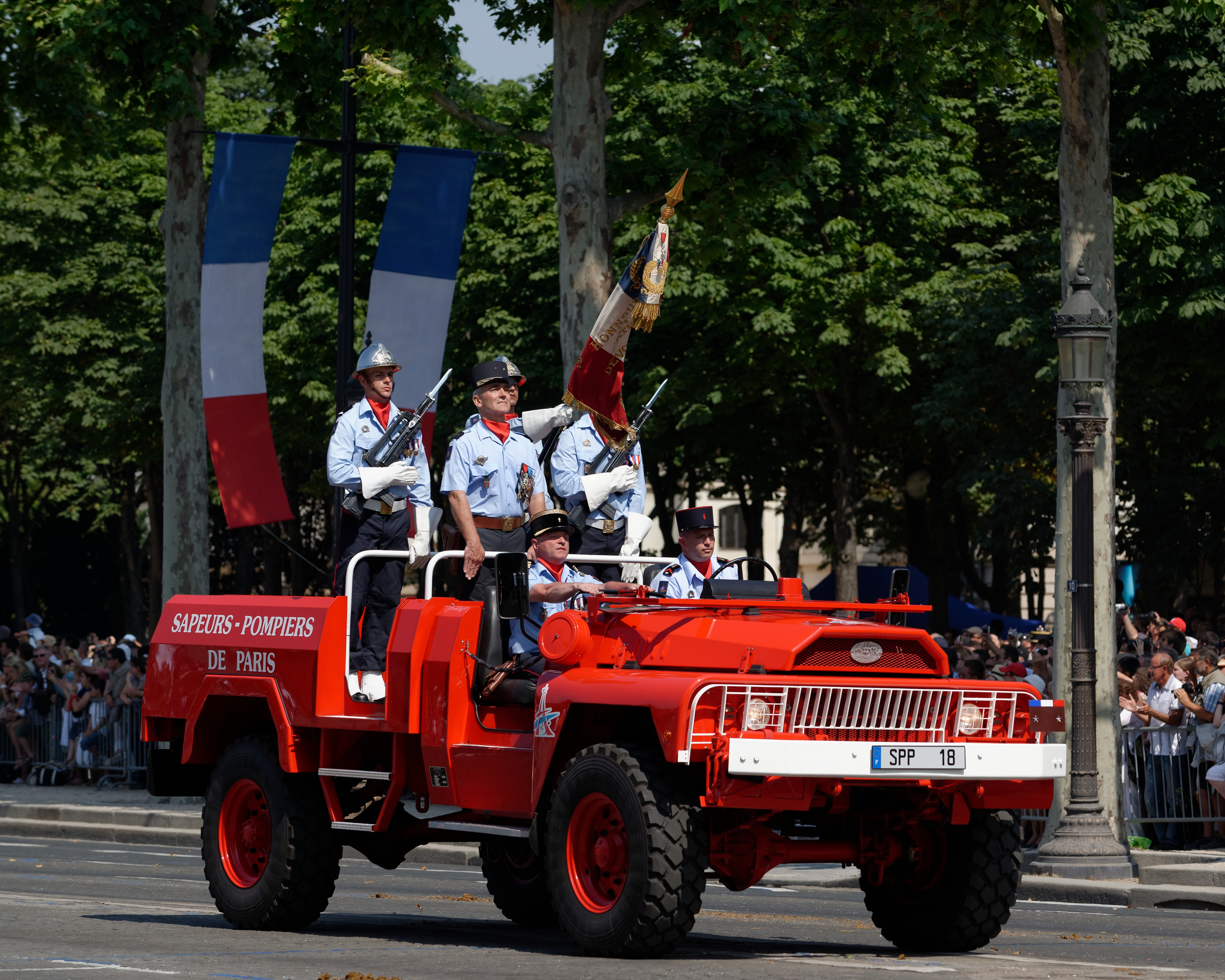
VLRA used as a flag-carrying vehicle by the Paris Fire Brigade

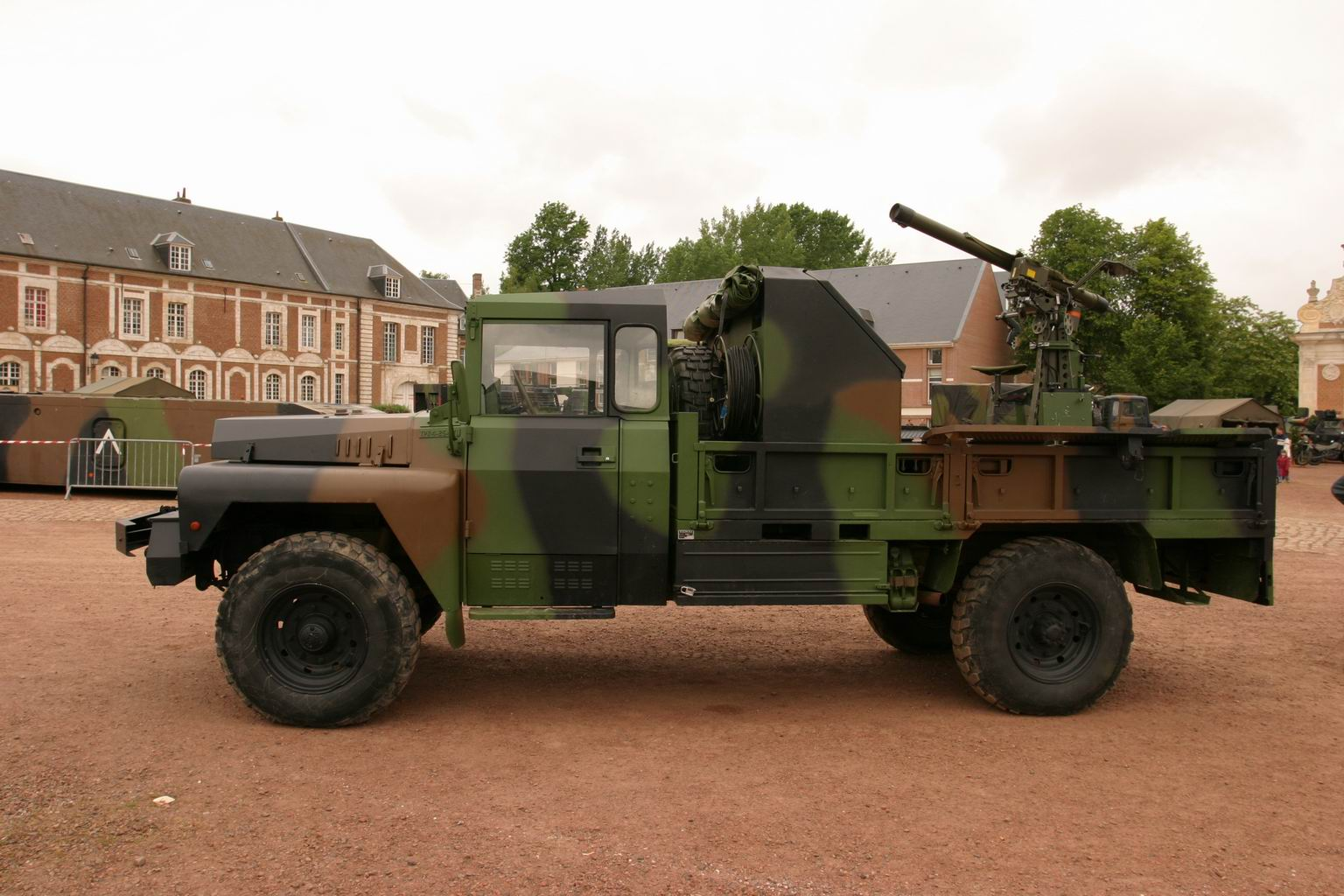
VLRA TPK 425 Pamela for Mistral surface-to-air missile firing station.

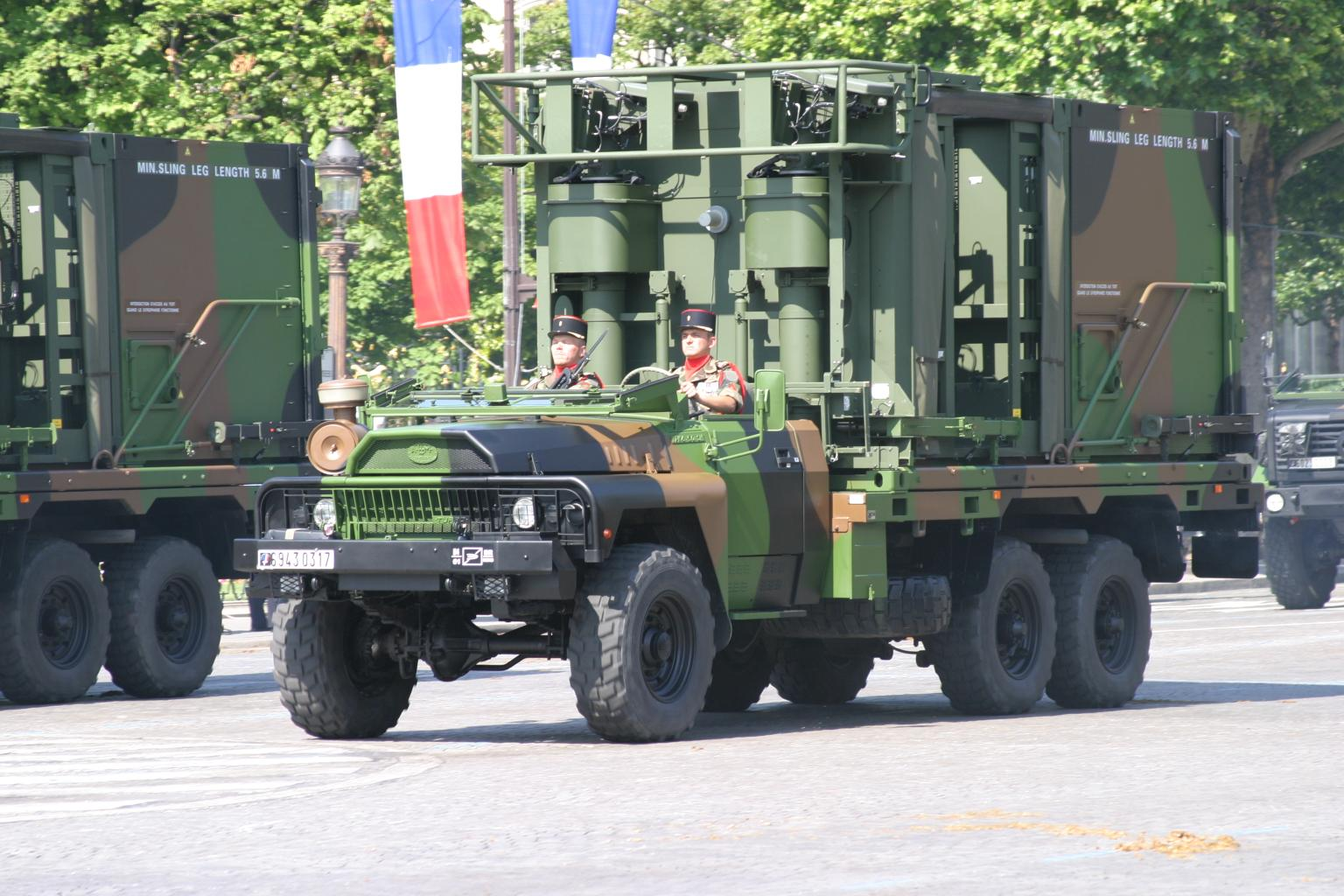
TPK 650 container carrier.

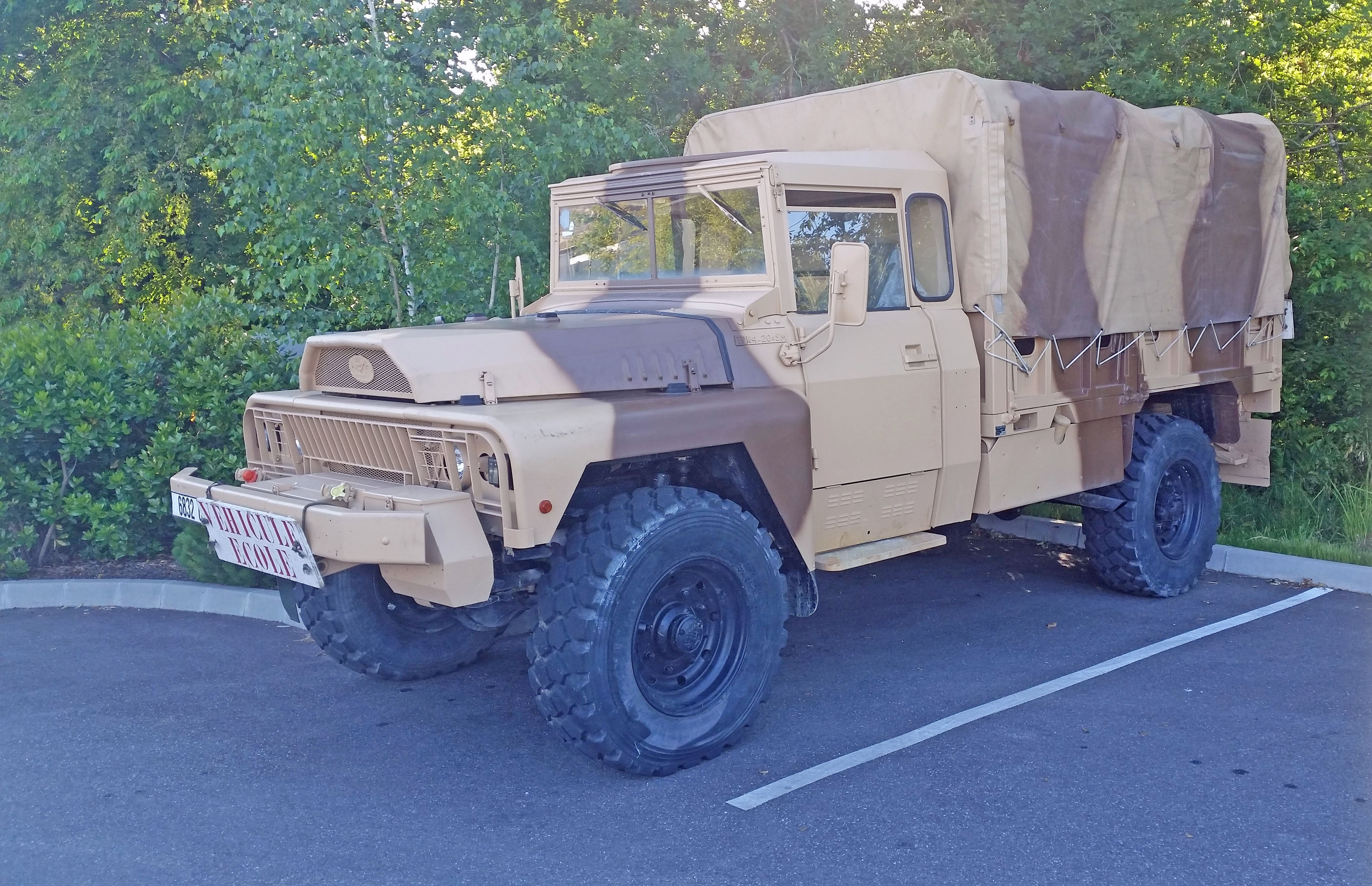
Military truck ACMAT.

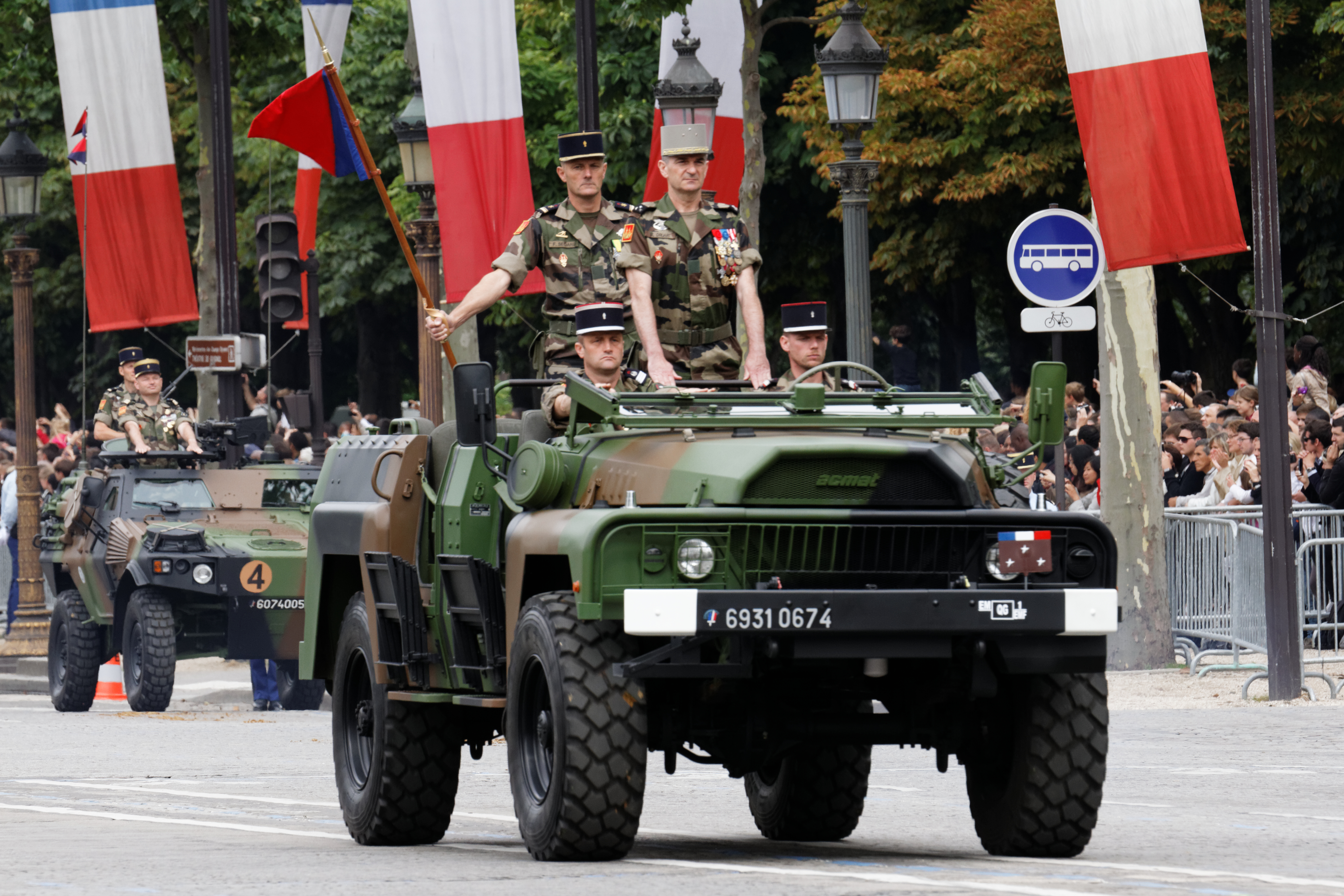
VLRA of Force Headquarters No. 1 at the Bastille Day parade on the Champs-Élysées in Paris.

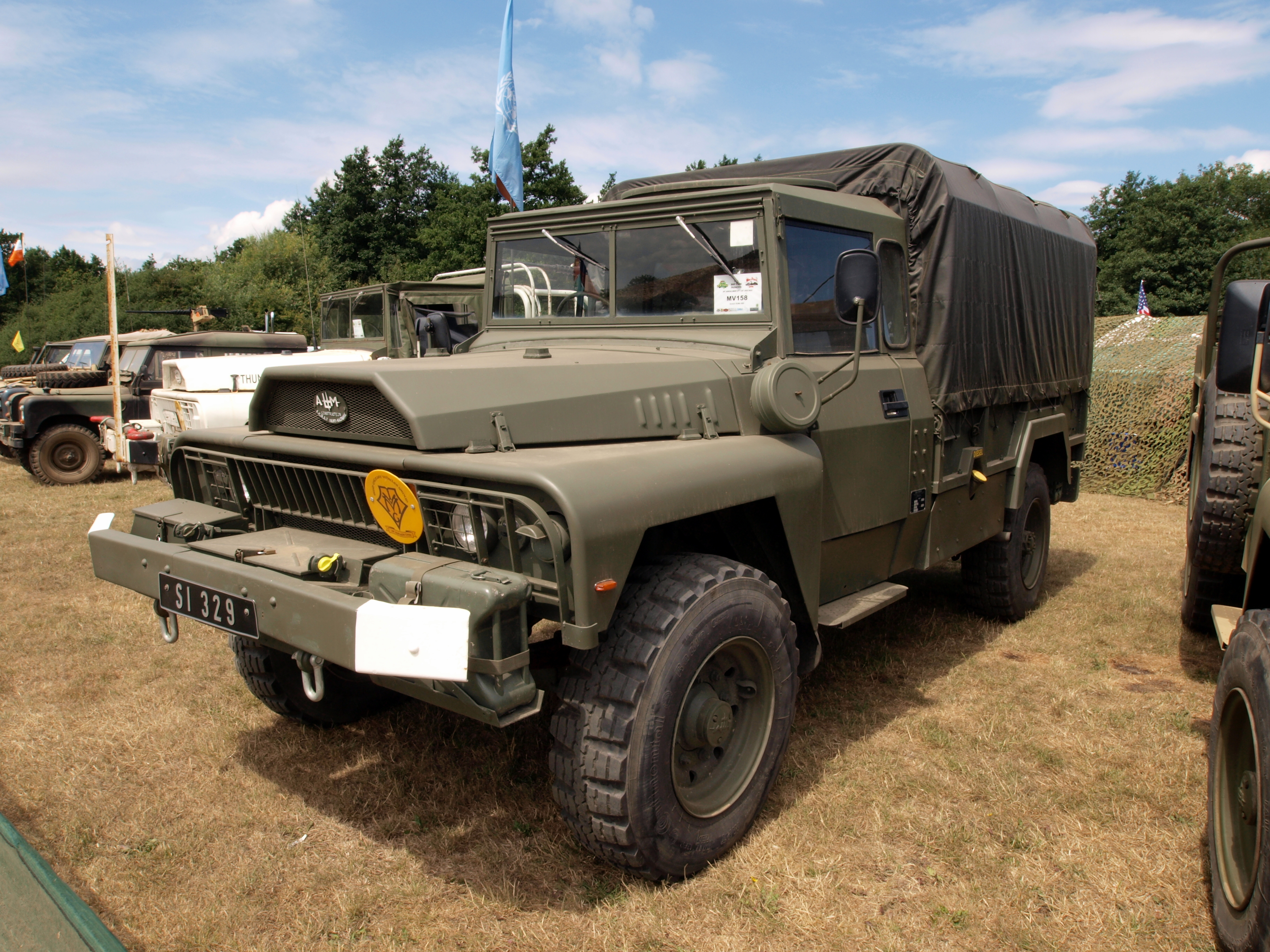
ACMAT VLRA at the War & Peace show 2010.

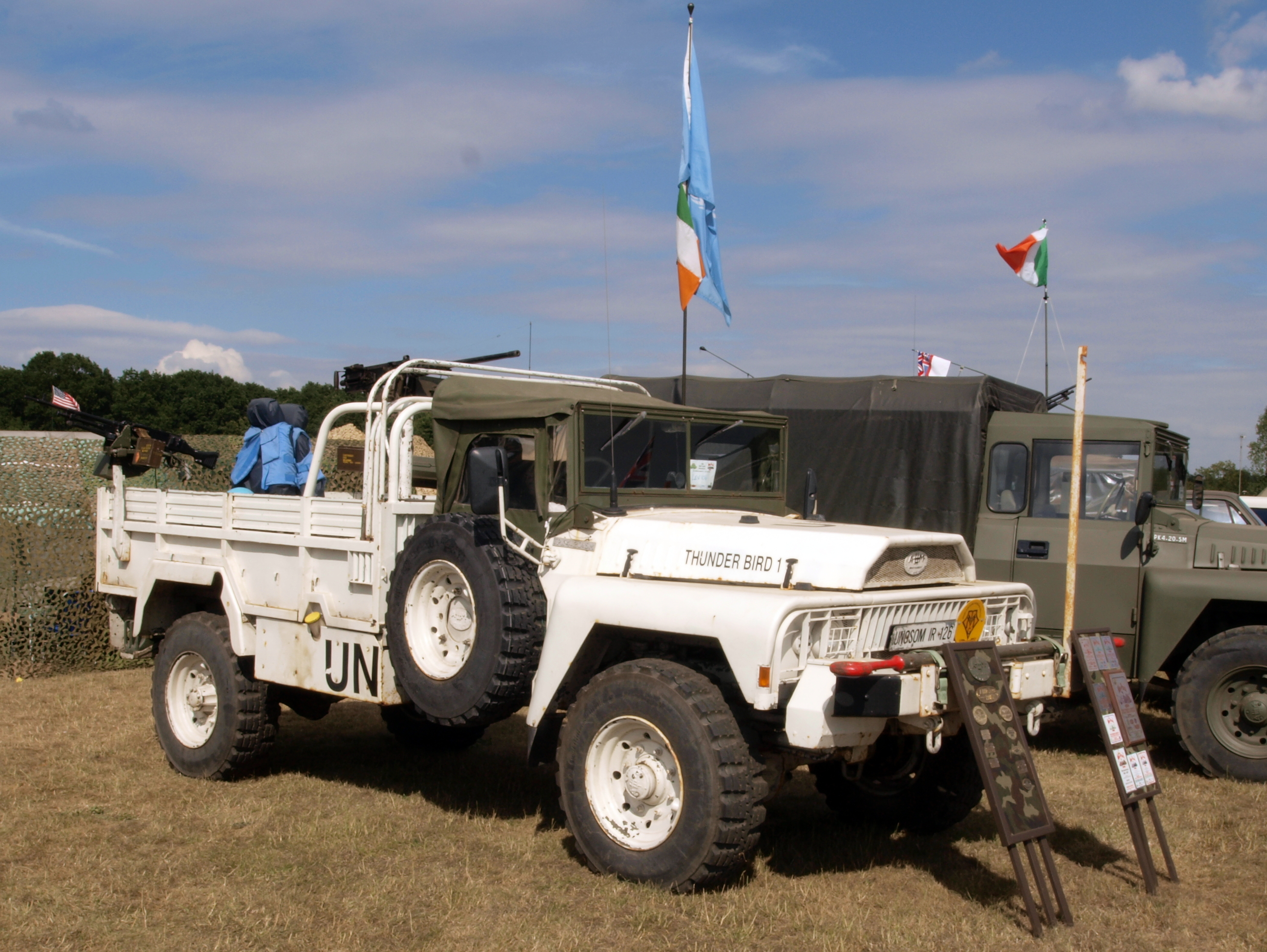
ACMAT VLRA at War & Peace show 2010.

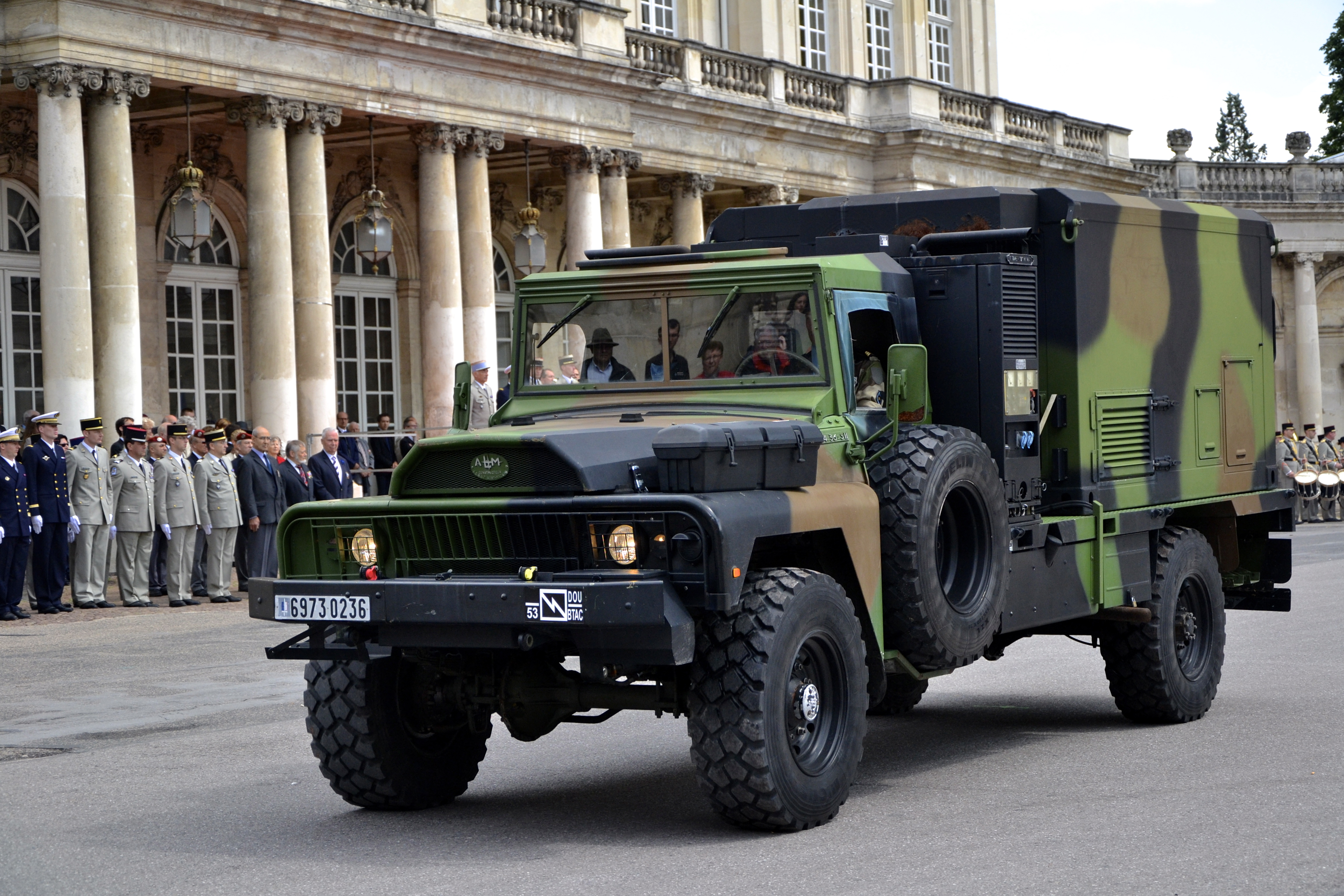
ACMAT TPK 436 SH.

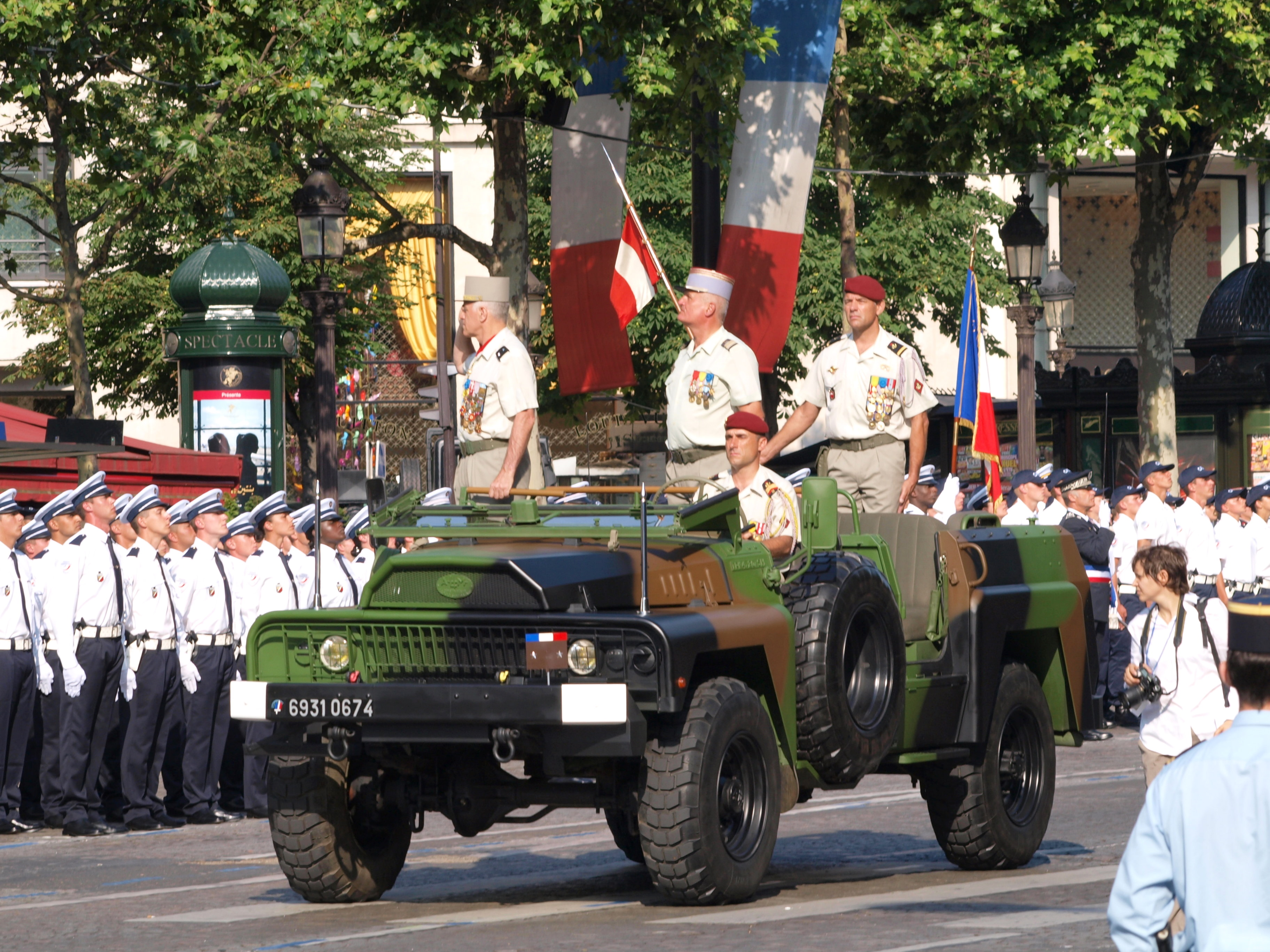
ACMAT VLRA.

New Generation gallery (2009 redesign)

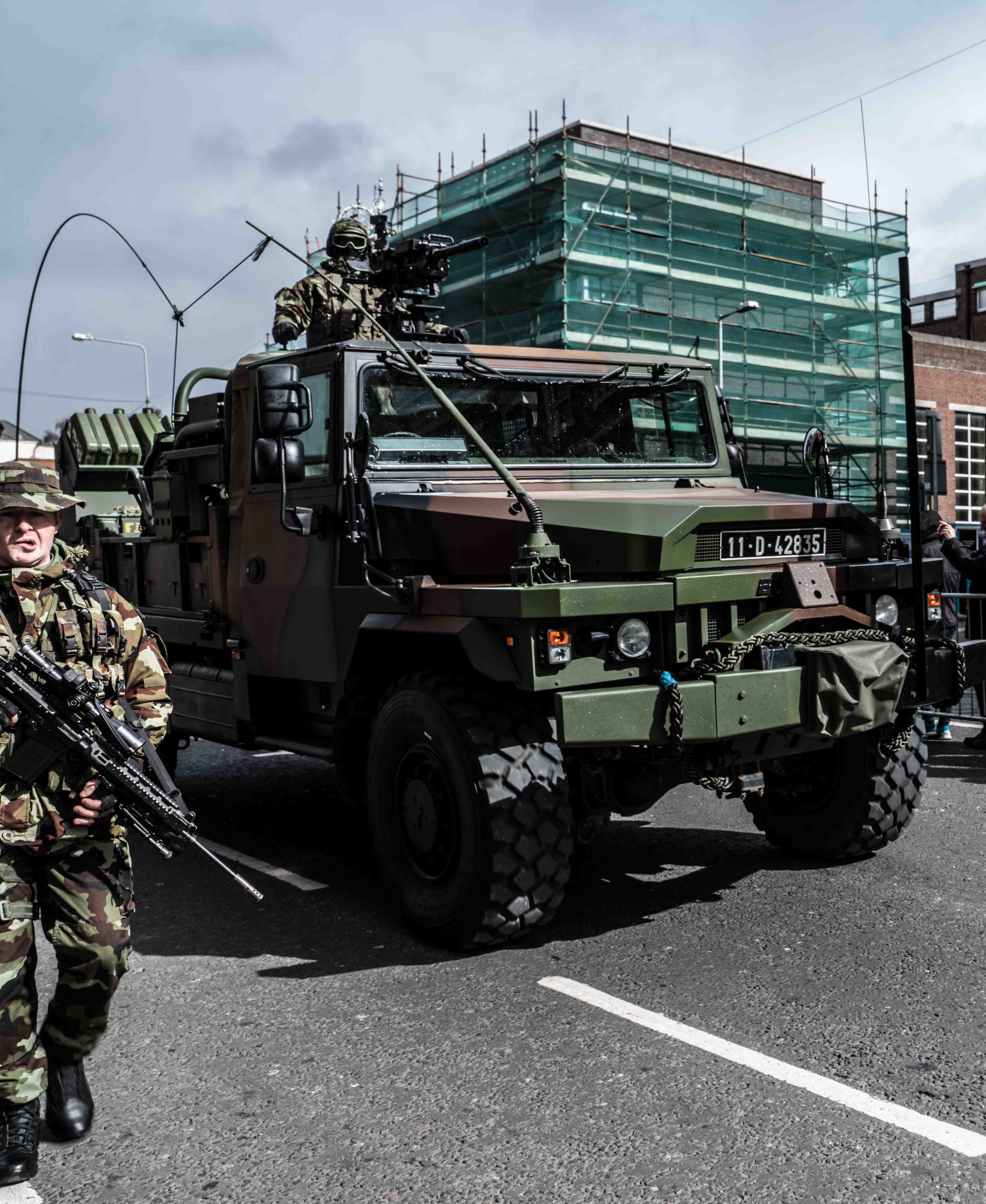
Irish Army Ranger Wing VLRA

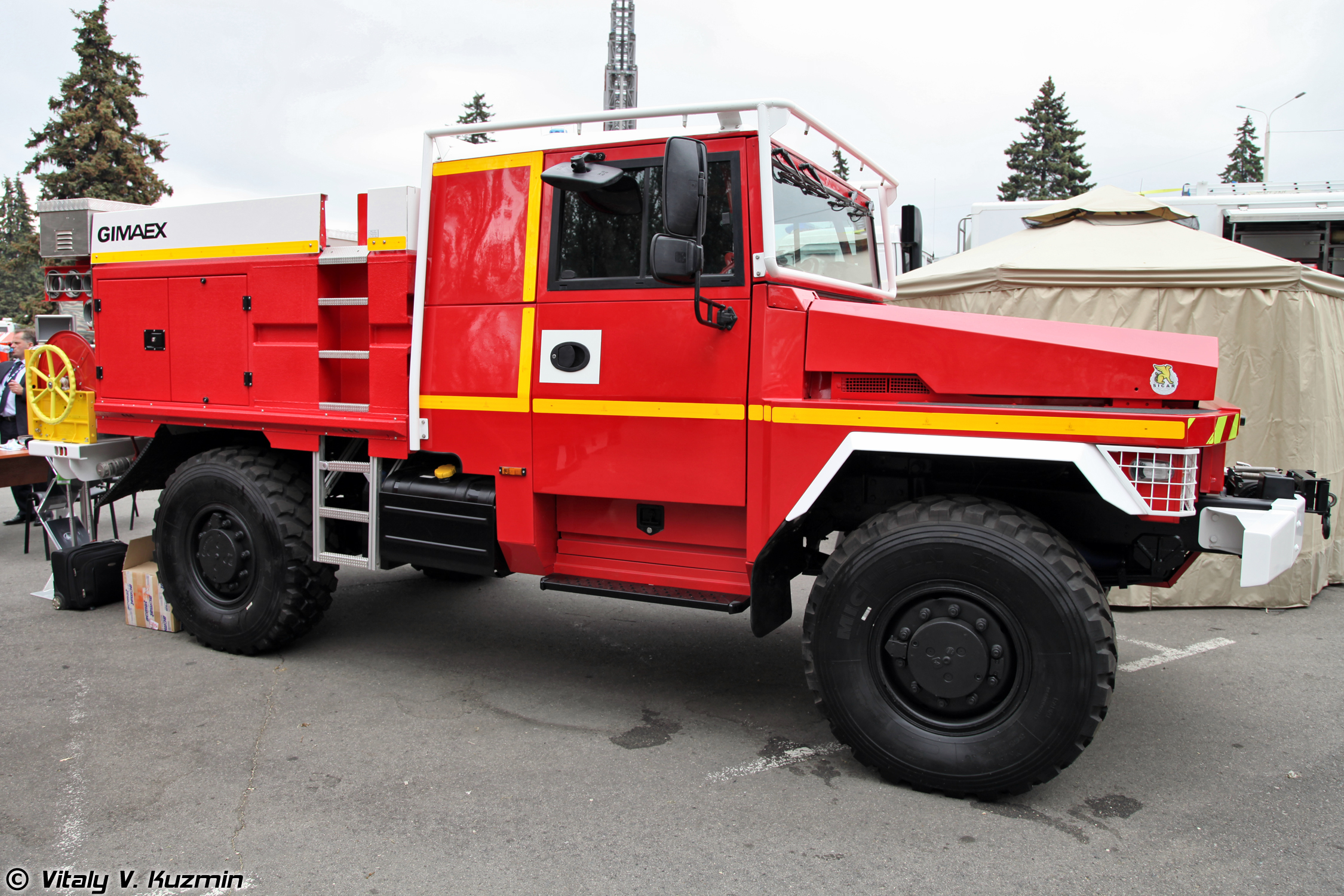
ACMAT TDE 4.36 CCF-L.

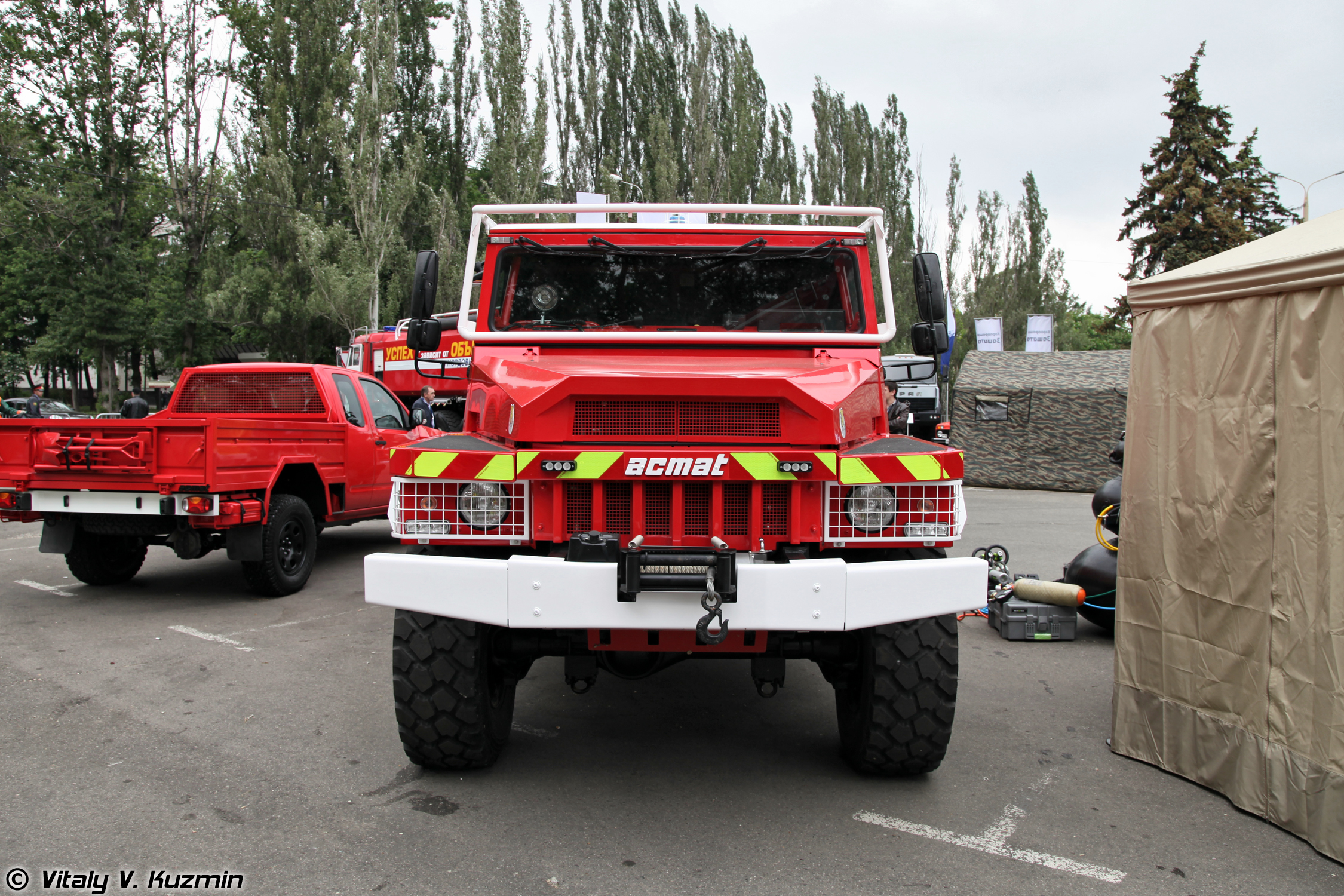
ACMAT TDE 4.36 CCF-L.

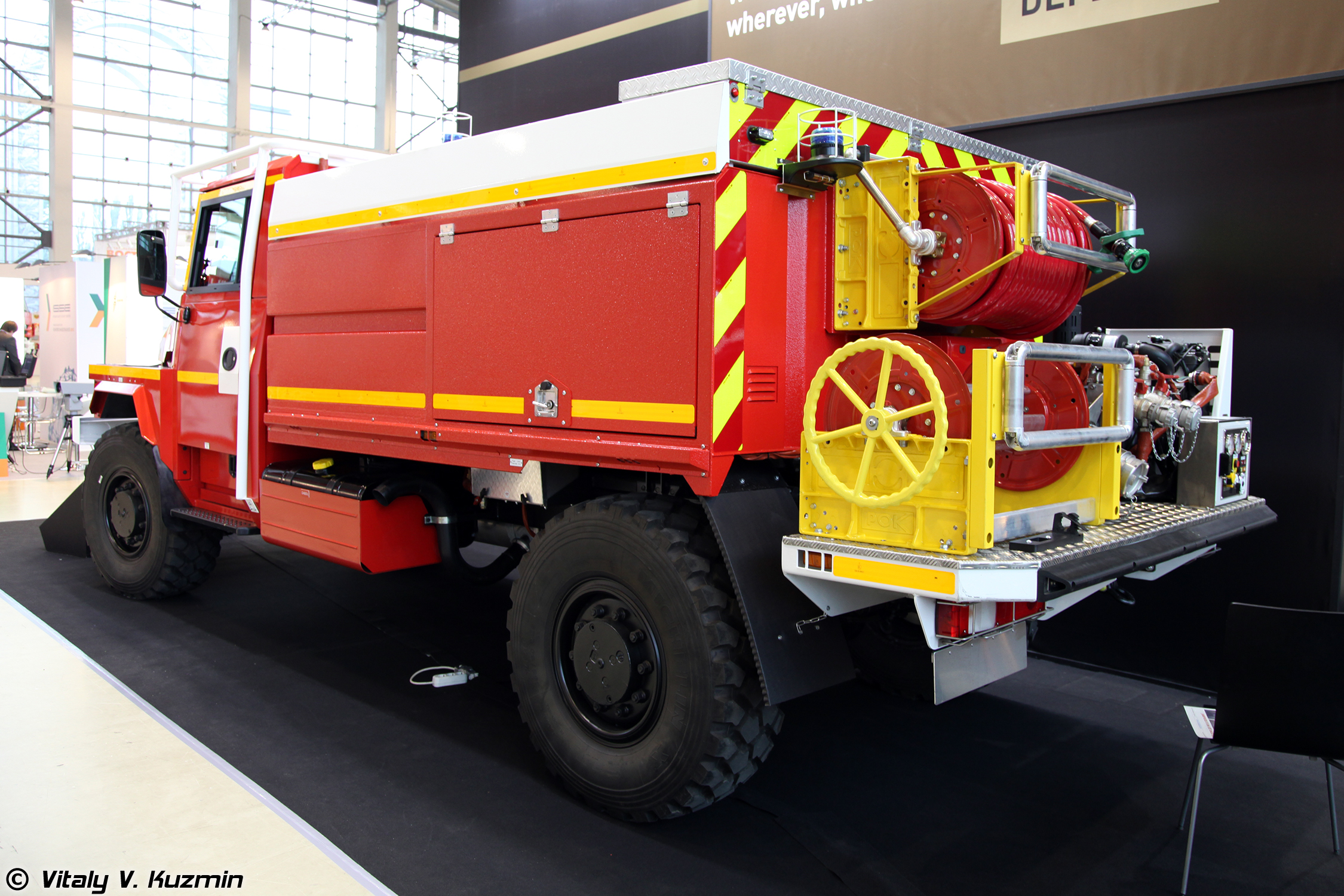
ACMAT 4.43 CCF.

== Used by ==
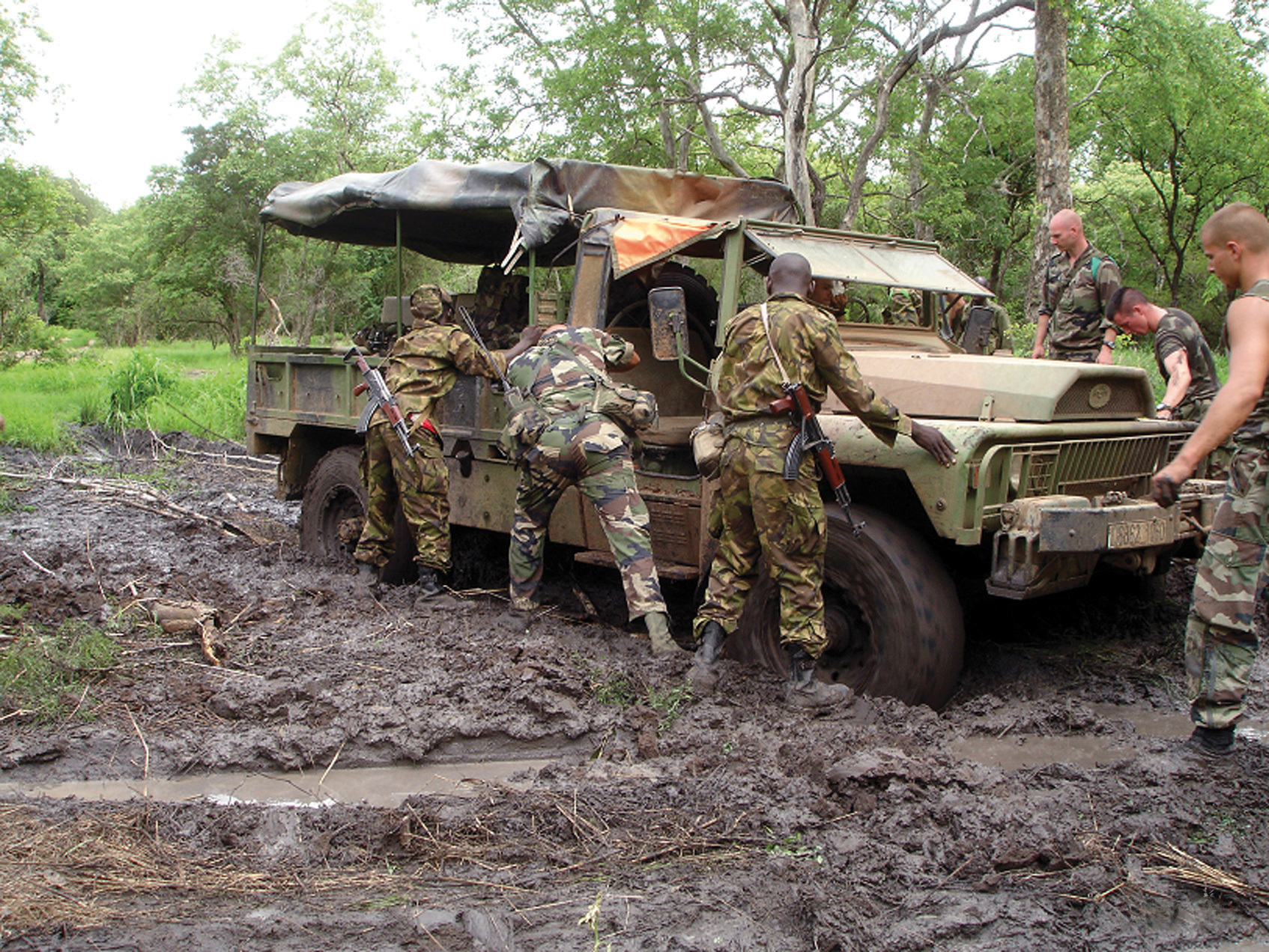
An ACMAT in service with the Chad National Army.

Military users include:

- Botswana
- Chad
- Chile
- Cyprus
- France
- Ireland
- Kenya
- Mali
- Morocco
- United Kingdom: In 1996, the British Army ordered twenty VLRA 4x4 TPK 420 STL2 as logistics vehicles for motorized patrols of the Special Air Service (SAS). They were used during an operation in Afghanistan in November 2001. The only known photos of the VLRA in service with the SAS were published in the Raids magazine of October 2007.
- Zimbabwe
