= Denel Vektor M1 60mm Mortar =

- Type: Mortar
- Place of origin: South Africa

Service history
- Used by: South Africa, Ireland, Rwanda

Production history
- Manufacturer: Vektor

Specifications
- Mass: 17.8kg
- Barrel length: 650mm
- Crew: 4
- Caliber: 60mm
- Rate of fire: 15–20 rounds per minute
- Effective firing range: 100 to 2,108 metres
- Sights: C2 AI

The Denel Vektor M1 60mm Mortar is a mortar manufactured by the South African firm Denel Land Systems for use by the South African Army and the Irish Defence Forces (since 2003). Around 100 were also sold to the Forces Armées Rwandaises in 1992, during the Rwandan Civil War.
