= List of Irish state vessels =

This list identifies active and former maritime vessels of the Irish state, both civilian and military. This list is incomplete.

== Active ==
=== Irish Naval Service ===
Name	Image	Type	No.	Comm.	Displacement	Length	Notes
Patrol vessels
LÉ Samuel Beckett	LÉ Samuel Beckett (P61)	Samuel Beckett-class offshore patrol vessel (OPV)	P61	2014	2,256 t	90 m	Three P60s on operational rotation as of November 2025
LÉ James Joyce	LÉ Samuel Beckett (P61)	Samuel Beckett-class offshore patrol vessel (OPV)	P62	2015	2,256 t	90 m	Three P60s on operational rotation as of November 2025
LÉ William Butler Yeats	LÉ Samuel Beckett (P61)	Samuel Beckett-class offshore patrol vessel (OPV)	P63	2016	2,256 t	90 m	Three P60s on operational rotation as of November 2025
LÉ George Bernard Shaw	LÉ Samuel Beckett (P61)	Samuel Beckett-class offshore patrol vessel (OPV)	P64	2019	2,256 t	90 m	Three P60s on operational rotation as of November 2025
LÉ Róisín	LÉ Niamh (P52)	Róisín-class large patrol vessel (LPV)	P51	1999	1,500 t	78.84 m	In reserve as of November 2025.
LÉ Niamh	LÉ Niamh (P52)	Róisín-class large patrol vessel (LPV)	P52	2001	1,500 t	78.84 m	In reserve as of November 2025.
LÉ Aoibhinn	LÉ Aoibhinn (P71)	Lake-class inshore patrol vessel (IPV)	P71	2024	340 t	55 m	Operational as of November 2025 in rotation with P60s
LÉ Gobnait	LÉ Aoibhinn (P71)	Lake-class inshore patrol vessel (IPV)	P72	2024	340 t	55 m	Not operational

==== Naval Service Reserve ====
Name	Image	Type	No.	Entered service	Displacement	Length	Notes
Motor launches
Fionnghuala		Cygnus Typhoon motor launch	YP01	2024	30 t	14 m	Used for training, port security, and coastal patrol. Manned by a crew of four. Fitted for two 7.62mm GPMG. Two more on order; Due to be named Conn and Fiachra.
Aodh		Cygnus Typhoon motor launch	YP02	2026	30 t	14 m	Used for training, port security, and coastal patrol. Manned by a crew of four. Fitted for two 7.62mm GPMG. Two more on order; Due to be named Conn and Fiachra.

=== Garda Water Unit ===
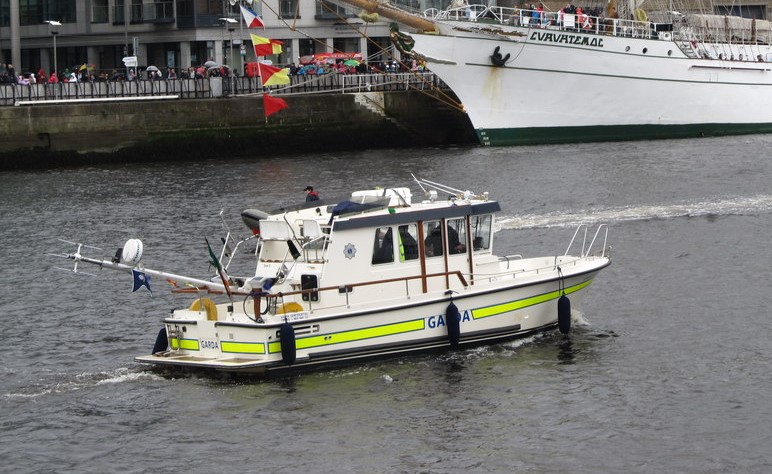
Garda Patrol Boat Colm na Cora on the River Liffey

Quantity	Type	Commissioned
1	Arvor 250 Inland Patrol Boat	2007
1	Targa 31 Colm na Cora Inland Patrol Boat	2000
1	Osprey Rigid Inflatable Boat	1996
3	Delta Inflatable Boat	2007
1	Zodiac Inflatable Boat	1999
3	Zodiac Inflatable Boat	2013
5	Other inflatable boats	2009–2011

=== Revenue Commissioners ===
Name	Image	Type	Entered service	Displacement	Length	Notes
RCC Suirbhéir	RCC Faire	Customs cutter	2004	50 t	23.6 m	
RCC Faire	RCC Faire	Customs cutter	2009	50 t	23.6 m	
RCC Cosaint		Customs cutter	2025		35 m	To replace Suirbhéir

=== Marine Institute ===
Name	Image	Type	Entered service	Displacement	Length	Notes
RV Tom Crean	Tom Crean	Multi-purpose research vessel	2022		52.8 m	Designed by Skipsteknisk AS, and built by Astilleros Armon Vigo S.A.
RV Celtic Explorer	Celtic Explorer	Multi-purpose research vessel	2003	2,425 GT	65.5 m	
Dulra na Mara		Inshore research vessel		15.1 GT	12.3 m	

=== Geological Survey of Ireland ===
Name	Image	Type	Entered service	Displacement	Length	Notes
RV Keary		Near-shore hydrographic survey vessel	2009	36 t	15.5 m	Built by Veecraft Marine, South Africa
RV Geo		Shallow water survey vessel	2007		7.4 m	Redbay Stormforce RIB
RV Tonn		Shallow water survey vessel	2015		7.9 m	Cheetah Catamaran
RV Mallet		Inshore hydrographic research vessel			18 m	
RV Lir		Shallow water survey vessel			11 m	Redbay Stormforce RIB
RV Galtee		Shallow water survey vessel			11 m	Redbay Stormforce RIB

=== Commissioners of Irish Lights ===
Name	Image	Type	Entered service	Displacement	Length	Notes
ILV Granuaile III	ILV Granuaile	Multipurpose support vessel	2000	3903 t	80 m	

=== Dublin Fire Brigade ===
Name	Image	Type	Entered service	Length	Notes
Rescue One		Redbay Stormforce RIB	2022	7.4 m	Search and rescue

=== Dublin Port ===
Name	Image	Type	Entered service	Displacement	Length	Notes
Shackleton	Dublin Port Tugs, Beaufort and Shackleton	Harbour tug	2010	284 GT	24 m	Built by Astilleros Zamakona
Beaufort	Dublin Port Tugs, Beaufort and Shackleton	Harbour tug	2010	284 GT	24 m	Built by Astilleros Zamakona
Camac		Pilot boat	2007	16.5 lightship tons	13.4 m	Safehaven Marine Interceptor 42
Liffey		Pilot boat	2008	16.5 lightship tons	13.4 m	Safehaven Marine Interceptor 42
Tolka		Pilot boat	2019	22 lightship tons	17.1 m	Goodchild Marine ORC 171
Dodder		Pilot boat	2022	22 lightship tons	17.1 m	Goodchild Marine ORC 171

=== Port of Cork ===
Name	Image	Type	Entered service	Displacement	Length	Notes
Failte		Pilot boat	2012		14.3 m	Safehaven Marine Interceptor 48
Solas		Pilot boat	2024		14.3 m	Safehaven Marine Interceptor 48

Port of Cork previously operated another Savehaven Marine Interceptor 42 pilot boat, Gleann Mor, which was acquired in 2005.

=== Port of Waterford ===
Name	Image	Type	Entered service	Displacement	Length	Notes
Port Láirge		Pilot boat	2021		14.3 m	Safehaven Marine Interceptor 48

=== Inland Fisheries Ireland ===
Name	Image	Type	Entered service	Length	Notes
Delta 1 - 12		Delta 780HX RIB	2018	7.8 m	Fishery protection of rivers, lakes and coastal waters

=== Dublin City Council ===
Name	Image	Type	Entered service	Displacement	Length	Notes
Jeanie Johnston	Jeanie Johnston moored off Custom House Quay, Dublin	Three-masted barque	2002	518 t	47 m	A museum ship replica of the original 1847 ship. Docked at Custom House Quay

== Former ==
=== Irish Naval Service ===
The following vessels have served with the Naval Service:

Name	Image	Type	No.	Service years	Fate	Notes
LÉ Macha	HMS Borage before it became LÉ Macha	Flower-class corvette	01	1946–1970	Sold for scrap in 1970	Former HMS Borage
LÉ Maev	HMS Borage before it became LÉ Macha	Flower-class corvette	02	1946–1972	Scrapped in 1972	Former HMS Oxlip
LÉ Cliona	HMS Borage before it became LÉ Macha	Flower-class corvette	03	1947–1970	Sold for scrap in 1970	Former HMS Bellwort
LÉ Grainne	HMS Glasserton, a similar Ton minesweeper	Ton-class minesweeper	CM10	1971–1987	Sold for scrap in 1987	Former HMS Oulston
LÉ Banba	HMS Glasserton, a similar Ton minesweeper	Ton-class minesweeper	CM11	1971–1984	Sold for scrap in 1984	Former HMS Alverton
LÉ Fola	HMS Glasserton, a similar Ton minesweeper	Ton-class minesweeper	CM12	1971–1987	Sold to a Spanish company for scrap in 1987	Former HMS Blaxton
LÉ Deirdre	LÉ Deirdre	Offshore patrol vessel	P20	1972–2001	Scrapped in 2014	Prototype of the P20 class
LÉ Setanta		Auxiliary ship	A15	1976–1984	Sold for scrap in 1984	Former Irish Lights vessel Isolde
LÉ Ferdia		Patrol vessel	A16	1977–1978	Chartered for one year	Former MFV Helen Basse
LÉ Emer	LÉ Aisling	Emer-class offshore patrol vessel	P21	1978–2013	Acquired by Nigerian Navy in 2015	Modified version of LÉ Deirdre. Renamed NNS Prosperity by Nigerians
LÉ Aoife	LÉ Aisling	Emer-class offshore patrol vessel	P22	1979–2015	Donated to Maltese Navy in 2015	Modified version of LÉ Deirdre. Renamed P62 by Maltese
LÉ Aisling	LÉ Aisling	Emer-class offshore patrol vessel	P23	1980–2016	Acquired by Libyan National Army in 2018	Modified version of LÉ Deirdre. Renamed Al-Karama by Libyans
LÉ Eithne	LÉ Eithne	Helicopter patrol vessel	P31	1984–2022	Scrapped in 2024	Equipped with helicopter hangar and deck
LÉ Orla	LÉ Orla	Peacock-class coastal patrol vessel	P41	1989–2022	Scrapped in 2024	Former HMS Swift
LÉ Ciara	LÉ Orla	Peacock-class coastal patrol vessel	P42	1989–2022	Scrapped in 2024	Former HMS Swallow

=== Marine and Coastwatching Service ===
The Marine and Coastwatching Service was a naval service that operated during The Emergency. In 1946, the service was integrated into the Defence Forces as the Naval Service and these ships were sold off.

Name	Image	Type	Service years	Fate	Notes
PV Muirchú	HMCS Malaspina of the same design as the Muirchú	Patrol vessel	1939–1947	Sold in January 1947 for scrap, but sank off Saltee Islands in May.	Launched in 1908 and served the Irish Free State from 1923 as an unarmed fisheries protection vessel. Later armed with a 12-pounder gun.
SS Fort Rannoch		Armed trawler	1939–1947	Sold in July 1947 to commercial service, and scrapped in 1963.	Leased by Department of Agriculture and Fisheries in 1937 for fisheries protection. Later armed with a 12-pounder gun.
SS Shark		Minelayer	1940–1948	Sold in 1948 and scrapped in 1952.	Built in 1891 as trawler, and later a salvage vessel.
Isallt		Sail training	1940–1945	Sold in 1945 and sank off Wicklow in December 1947.	A wooden three-masted schooner built in Wales in 1909.
M1	M1 Irish motor torpedo boat	Motor Torpedo Boat	1940–1948	Sold between 1948–1950 to Colonel James Fitzmaurice	M1 and M2 were originally built for Estonia and Latvia respectively. Built by Thornycroft, they were 72 feet in length, displaced 32 tons, a crew of ten, and powered by Isotta-Fraschini engines giving a top speed of 40 knots. They were armed with two 18-inch torpedoes, a 0.303-inch Hotchkiss machine gun, and two depth charges. M4, M5, and M6 were slightly larger, powered by Rolls Royce engines with a lower speed of 28 knots, and replaced the Hotchkiss with a 20 mm Madsen cannon. Their small size meant that these boats were not suited to Atlantic waters.
M2	M1 Irish motor torpedo boat	Motor Torpedo Boat	1940–1948	Sold between 1948–1950 to Colonel James Fitzmaurice	
M3	M1 Irish motor torpedo boat	Motor Torpedo Boat	1940–1948	Sold between 1948–1950 to Colonel James Fitzmaurice	
M4	M1 Irish motor torpedo boat	Motor Torpedo Boat	1942–1948	Sold between 1948–1950 to Colonel James Fitzmaurice	
M5	M1 Irish motor torpedo boat	Motor Torpedo Boat	1942–1948	Sold between 1948–1950 to Colonel James Fitzmaurice	
M6	M1 Irish motor torpedo boat	Motor Torpedo Boat	1943–1948	Sold between 1948–1950 to Colonel James Fitzmaurice	

=== Coastal and Marine Service ===
The Coastal and Marine Service (CMS) was a short-lived naval service that operated during the Irish Civil War. In addition to the CMS vessels listed below, several coastal landings were undertaken by the Irish National Army, during the civil war, using commandeered civilian passenger ships such as the TSS Arvonia and the SS Lady Wicklow. The CMS was disbanded in March 1924 after only several months of existence, and all of its ships, except Muirchú, were sold off.

Name	Image	Type	Notes
SS Dainty		Salvage tug/Patrol sloop	STOIC-class tug built in Chepstow in 1918 for the Admiralty. She had a length of 142 feet, displaced 459 GRT, and armed with a 12-pounder gun. Sold to French interests, renamed SS Cherbourgeois.
PV Muirchú	Sister ship HMCS Malaspina	Patrol vessel	Launched in 1908 as HMY Helga (Pendant No 064). Armed with a 12-pounder gun. Disarmed and transferred to Department of Agriculture and Fisheries for fisheries protection.
John Dunn (Adty No 3741)	Comparable Mersey trawler, HMT George Bligh	Mersey-class trawler	The Mersey trawlers were a class of over 100 naval trawlers built for the Royal Navy during World War I. The trawlers were 148 feet in length, displaced 438 long tons, a crew of 15, a speed of 11 knots, and armed with a 12-pounder gun.
John Dutton (Adty No 3739)	Comparable Mersey trawler, HMT George Bligh	Mersey-class trawler	The Mersey trawlers were a class of over 100 naval trawlers built for the Royal Navy during World War I. The trawlers were 148 feet in length, displaced 438 long tons, a crew of 15, a speed of 11 knots, and armed with a 12-pounder gun.
William Honnor (Adty No 3796)	Comparable Mersey trawler, HMT George Bligh	Mersey-class trawler	The Mersey trawlers were a class of over 100 naval trawlers built for the Royal Navy during World War I. The trawlers were 148 feet in length, displaced 438 long tons, a crew of 15, a speed of 11 knots, and armed with a 12-pounder gun.
Robert Murray (Adty No 4256)	Comparable Mersey trawler, HMT George Bligh	Mersey-class trawler	The Mersey trawlers were a class of over 100 naval trawlers built for the Royal Navy during World War I. The trawlers were 148 feet in length, displaced 438 long tons, a crew of 15, a speed of 11 knots, and armed with a 12-pounder gun.
Thomas Thresher (Adty No 3572)	Comparable Mersey trawler, HMT George Bligh	Mersey-class trawler	The Mersey trawlers were a class of over 100 naval trawlers built for the Royal Navy during World War I. The trawlers were 148 feet in length, displaced 438 long tons, a crew of 15, a speed of 11 knots, and armed with a 12-pounder gun.
Christopher Dixon (Adty No 3563)	Comparable Mersey trawler, HMT George Bligh	Mersey-class trawler	The Mersey trawlers were a class of over 100 naval trawlers built for the Royal Navy during World War I. The trawlers were 148 feet in length, displaced 438 long tons, a crew of 15, a speed of 11 knots, and armed with a 12-pounder gun.
TR.24	Comparable TR trawler, TR 9	TR series trawler	The TR trawlers were a Canadian version of the Castle-class trawler built by Canadian Vickers, Montreal during World War I. The trawlers were 133 feet 10 inches in length, displaced 275 long tons, a crew of 15, a speed of 10 knots, and armed with a 12-pounder gun.
TR.25	Comparable TR trawler, TR 9	TR series trawler	The TR trawlers were a Canadian version of the Castle-class trawler built by Canadian Vickers, Montreal during World War I. The trawlers were 133 feet 10 inches in length, displaced 275 long tons, a crew of 15, a speed of 10 knots, and armed with a 12-pounder gun.
TR.27	Comparable TR trawler, TR 9	TR series trawler	The TR trawlers were a Canadian version of the Castle-class trawler built by Canadian Vickers, Montreal during World War I. The trawlers were 133 feet 10 inches in length, displaced 275 long tons, a crew of 15, a speed of 10 knots, and armed with a 12-pounder gun.
TR.29	Comparable TR trawler, TR 9	TR series trawler	The TR trawlers were a Canadian version of the Castle-class trawler built by Canadian Vickers, Montreal during World War I. The trawlers were 133 feet 10 inches in length, displaced 275 long tons, a crew of 15, a speed of 10 knots, and armed with a 12-pounder gun.
TR.30	Comparable TR trawler, TR 9	TR series trawler	The TR trawlers were a Canadian version of the Castle-class trawler built by Canadian Vickers, Montreal during World War I. The trawlers were 133 feet 10 inches in length, displaced 275 long tons, a crew of 15, a speed of 10 knots, and armed with a 12-pounder gun.
TR.31	Comparable TR trawler, TR 9	TR series trawler	The TR trawlers were a Canadian version of the Castle-class trawler built by Canadian Vickers, Montreal during World War I. The trawlers were 133 feet 10 inches in length, displaced 275 long tons, a crew of 15, a speed of 10 knots, and armed with a 12-pounder gun.
Inishirrer (Official No. 135637)		Drifter	Built in Arklow in 1913, she was 65 feet in length and was assessed at 51 GRT. Acquired from Congested Districts Board in August 1922. Armed with machine guns
John S Summers (Official No 125960) (Admiralty No 2147)		Drifter	Built in Lowestoft in 1910, she was 77 feet length and assessed at 62 GRT. Was hired by Royal Navy as a net vessel during World War I. Armed with machine guns
ML1	A comparable ELCO motor launch, ML 59	Motor Launch	Four ELCO motor launches were acquired in May 1922 for the Marine Investigations Department. ML2 sank off Cornwall in July 1922 while being delivered. The launches were 80 feet in length, with a displacement of 37 long tons, a crew of 8, a speed of 19 knots, and armed with a 3-pounder gun.
ML2	A comparable ELCO motor launch, ML 59	Motor Launch	Four ELCO motor launches were acquired in May 1922 for the Marine Investigations Department. ML2 sank off Cornwall in July 1922 while being delivered. The launches were 80 feet in length, with a displacement of 37 long tons, a crew of 8, a speed of 19 knots, and armed with a 3-pounder gun.
ML3	A comparable ELCO motor launch, ML 59	Motor Launch	Four ELCO motor launches were acquired in May 1922 for the Marine Investigations Department. ML2 sank off Cornwall in July 1922 while being delivered. The launches were 80 feet in length, with a displacement of 37 long tons, a crew of 8, a speed of 19 knots, and armed with a 3-pounder gun.
ML4	A comparable ELCO motor launch, ML 59	Motor Launch	Four ELCO motor launches were acquired in May 1922 for the Marine Investigations Department. ML2 sank off Cornwall in July 1922 while being delivered. The launches were 80 feet in length, with a displacement of 37 long tons, a crew of 8, a speed of 19 knots, and armed with a 3-pounder gun.
190	An example of an naval pinnace	Steam pinnace	A pinnace is a type of ship's boat. They were 50 feet in length, displaced 14.4 long tons, a speed of 12 knots, and armed with machine guns.
199	An example of an naval pinnace	Steam pinnace	A pinnace is a type of ship's boat. They were 50 feet in length, displaced 14.4 long tons, a speed of 12 knots, and armed with machine guns.

There were also five unnamed patrol boats of unknown type used for river patrol.

=== Marine Institute ===
Before Marine Institute Ireland was founded in 1991, government of Ireland operated a number of vessels as research ships.

From the late 1960s to the 1970s, the government operated two research vessels, Cú Feasa and Cú na Mara. Cú na Mara was sold after being damaged due to a fire in 1972.

In 1976, Lough Beltra was purchased by the government of Ireland and refitted as a research vessel. Cú Feasa was taken out of service in 1976 due to poor condition, leaving Lough Beltra as the only remaining Irish research vessel.

Name	Image	Type	Service years	Displacement	Length	Notes
RV Lough Beltra		Fishing trawler/research vessel	1976–1997		21 m	
RV Celtic Voyager	Celtic Voyager	Multi-purpose research vessel	1997–2022	340 t	31.4 m	

=== Commissioners of Irish Lights ===
Here are listed all former Commissioners of Irish Lights (CIL) vessels (Irish Lights Tender, ILT) that served for some time after the formation of the Irish Free State in 1922. CIL as an organization predates the Republic of Ireland, and some historic CIL ships ended their service long before 1922.

- Tearaght (1892–1928) – see Kingstown Lifeboat Disaster
- Ierne (1898–1954)
- Alexandra (1904–1955)
- Deirdre (1919–1927)
- Nabro (1926–1949)
- Isolda (1928–1940) (Sunk off the Saltee Islands, County Wexford by German aircraft)
- Discovery II (1947–1948)
- Valonia (1947–1962)
- Granuaile (1948–1970)
- Blaskbeg (1953–1955)
- Isolda (1953–1976), sold to Irish Naval Service, renamed LÉ Setanta
- Ierne II (1955–1971)
- Atlanta (1959–1988)
- Granuaile II (1970–2000)
- Gray Seal (1988–1994)

=== Coiste an Asgard ===
Name	Image	Type	Service years	Displacement	Length	Notes
Asgard II	Asgard II	Brigantine	1981–2008		26.6 m	Was used for sail training Sunk in Bay of Biscay

== See also ==
- Irish Coast Guard
