= Chicoutimi (disambiguation) =

Chicoutimi is a borough in Quebec.

Chicoutimi may also refer to:

- Chicoutimi—Le Fjord, federal electoral district
- Chicoutimi—Saguenay, federal electoral district
- Chicoutimi (provincial electoral district)
- HMCS Chicoutimi, the name of several Canadian naval units
