= LÉ Aoife =

Irish Offshore Patrol Vessel

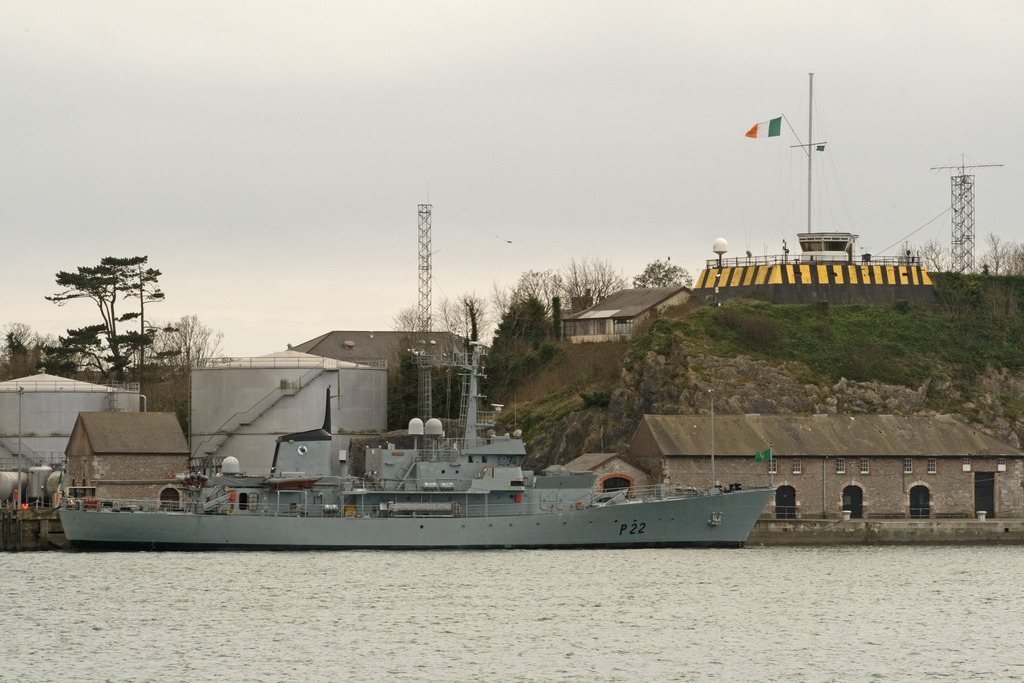
- Aoife at Haulbowline in March 2008

History

Ireland
- Name: LÉ Aoife
- Namesake: Aoife, step-mother to the children of Lir
- Builder: Verolme Dockyard, Cork
- Laid down: 3 July 1978
- Launched: 12 April 1979
- Commissioned: 29 November 1979
- Decommissioned: 31 January 2015
- Home port: Haulbowline Naval Base
- Identification: IMO number: 7728974; Hull number: P22
- Fate: Donated to Malta, 2015

Malta
- Name: P62
- Commissioned: 26 June 2015
- Identification: IMO number: 7728974; MMSI number: 248000957; Callsign: 9HB4118
- Status: in active service

General characteristics
- Class & type: Emer-class offshore patrol vessel
- Displacement: 1019.5 tonnes standard
- Length: 65.2 m (214 ft) overall
- Beam: 10.5 m (34 ft)
- Draught: 4.4 m (14 ft)
- Speed: 31.5 km/h (17.0 kn) maximum
- Complement: 46 (5 officers and 41 ratings )
- Armament: 1 × Bofors 40 mm; 2 × Rheinmetall Rh202 20 mm cannons (removed before transfer to Malta); 7.62 mm L7 GPMGs

LÉ Aoife (P22) of the Irish Naval Service, now known as P62 of the Maritime Squadron of the Armed Forces of Malta, was built as an offshore patrol vessel in 1978.

Serving the Irish Naval Service since 1979, Aoife was decommissioned by Ireland in 2015, and donated to the Armed Forces of Malta. It was commissioned as the patrol boat P62 on 28 June 2015.

== Operational history ==
=== Irish service ===
Aoife was first commissioned when European Union (then EEC) funding became available in response to the extension of the Irish Exclusive Fisheries Zone from 12 nautical miles (22 km; 14 mi) to 200 nautical miles (370 km; 230 mi) in 1976.

Together with sister ships LÉ Deirdre (decommissioned in 2001), LÉ Emer (decommissioned in 2013) and LÉ Aisling (decommissioned in 2016), Aoife was built at Verolme Cork Dockyard.

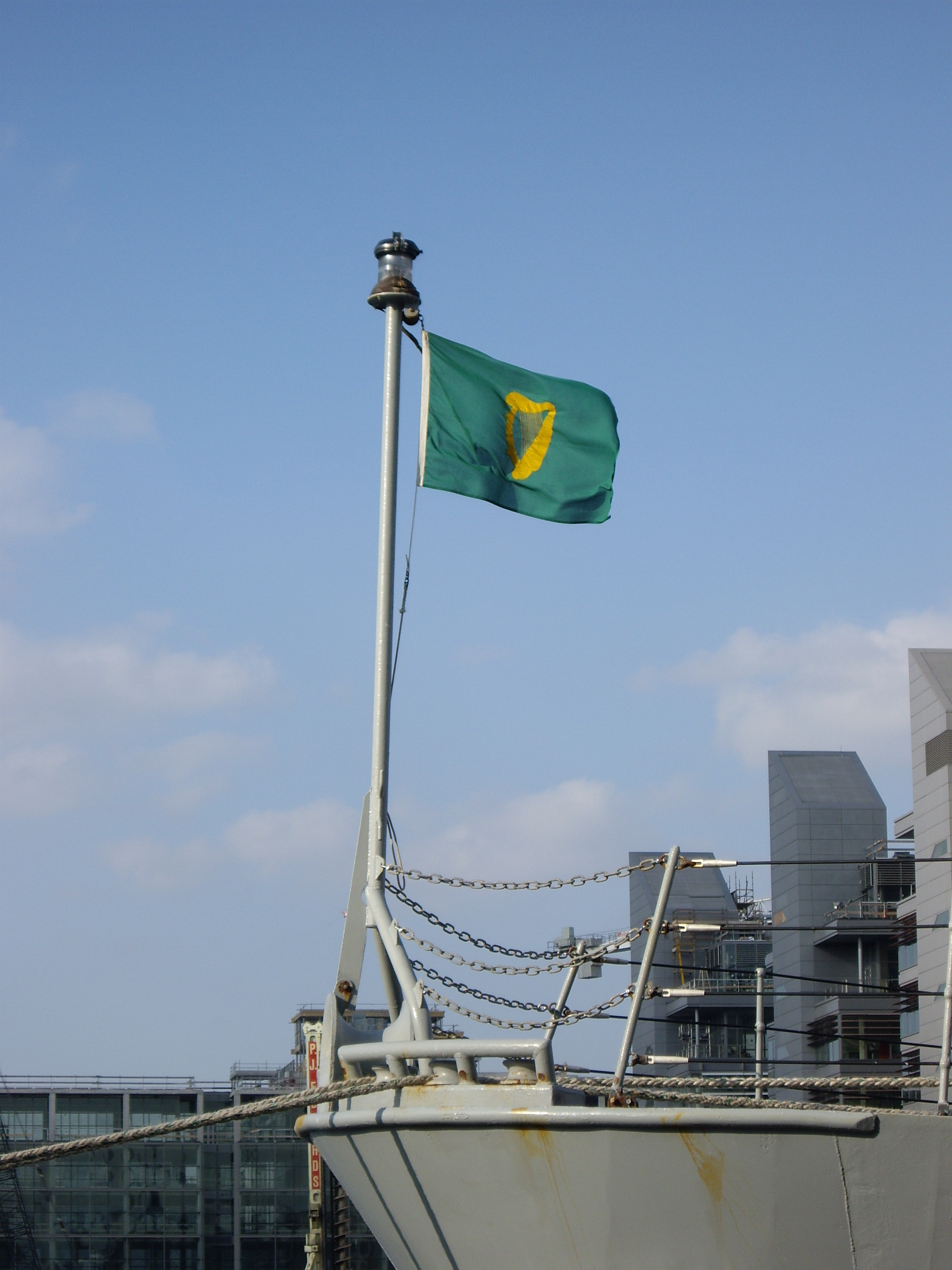
Irish naval jack flying from bow of LÉ Aoife while at port in Dublin

Originally named after Aoife, step-mother to the children of Lir, Aoife operated primarily as a fisheries protection vessel. Aoife also assisted however in emergency rescue operations and other naval support roles.

In 1986 Richard Branson's Virgin Challenger II was attempting to break the transatlantic speed record set by United States in 1952. (Note: Known as the Blue Riband, the competition is unofficial, and general opinion is that it is limited to ships on a regular passenger-carrying voyage) Challenger left New York Harbour on 26 June 1986 and refueled, as prearranged, at an oil rig on the Grand Banks of Newfoundland. However, four tons of water also entered her tanks and soon, Challenger needed more fuel filters. (Note: These fuel filters were blocks of foam encased in a rubber skin. Diesel fuel can pass through them while water is trapped in the foam. After thirty minutes they have to be replaced. They can, as in this event, be drained of water and reused, but it is for decreasing shorter periods of time) Branson's London control centre requested help from the RAF but the Royal Navy did not have a ship in the area. Aoife, 160 miles distant, was informed and an RAF Nimrod dropped a canister of filters to Challenger. Aoife reached Challenger at 00:43 on 29 June. Her crew refueled Challenger, which went on to complete the voyage, taking two hours and nine minutes off the previous record. Branson invited representatives of the ships company to the celebrations in London, saying "We could not have succeeded without their help".

In October 2004, Aoife assisted in the rescue of the Canadian Forces submarine Chicoutimi off the north-western coast of Ireland.

In July 2007, Aoife assisted in the rescue of over 100 children taking part in a sailing regatta off Dun Laoghaire Harbour.

Despite the ship's home port being Haulbowline Island in Cork Harbour, it had a close relationship with the city of Waterford and its crew were involved in fund-raising for the children's ward of the University Hospital Waterford.

LÉ Aoife was decommissioned in Waterford on 31 January 2015 and later donated to Malta.

=== Maltese service ===
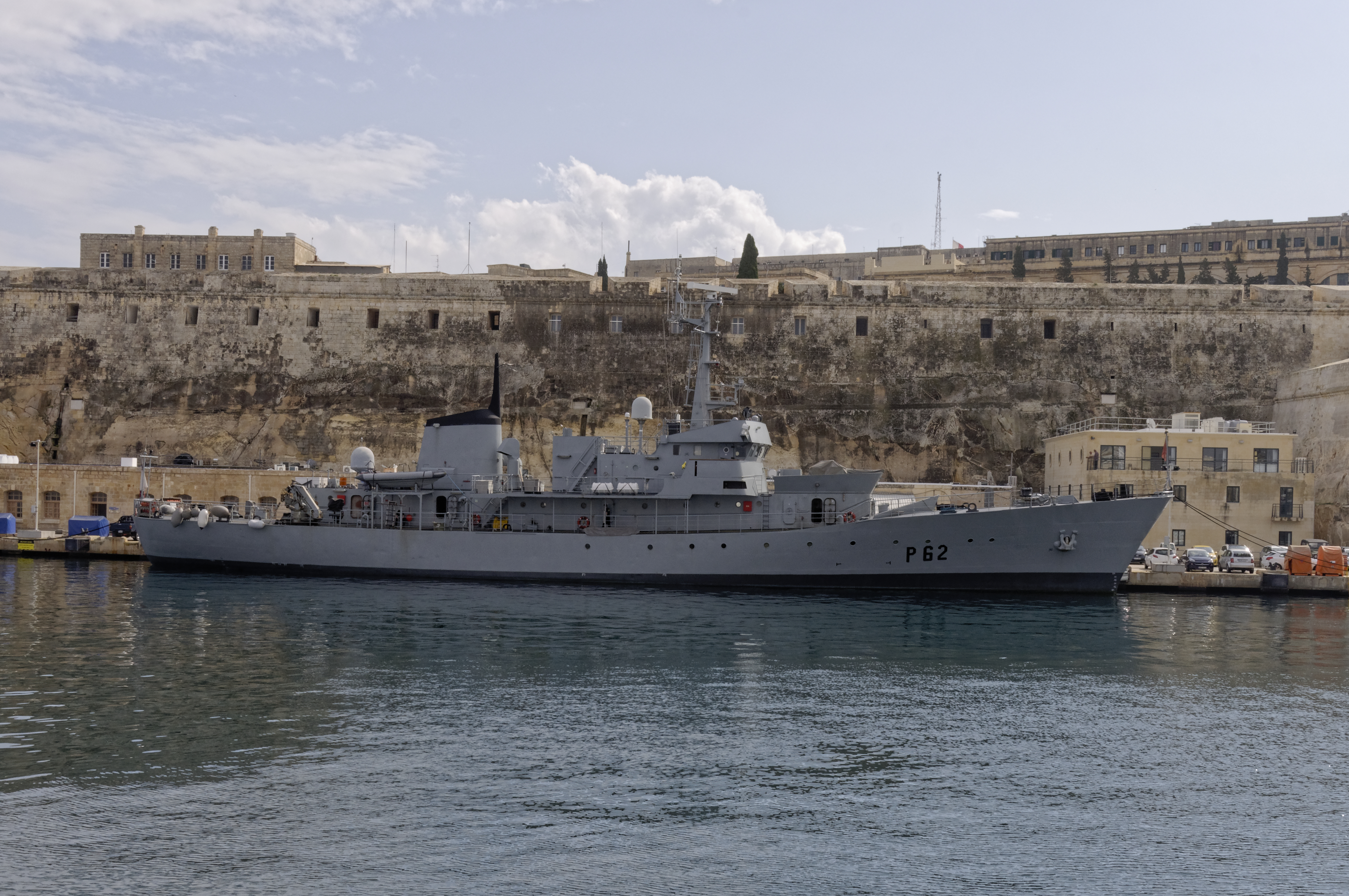
P62 at Hay Wharf, Malta

Aoife was commissioned into the Maritime Squadron of the Armed Forces of Malta on 28 June 2015, and given the pennant number P62. It is the largest vessel in the Maritime Squadron, being larger than the flagship, the Diciotti-class offshore patrol boat P61. It arrived in Malta in November 2015, intended initially for use in humanitarian operations in the Mediterranean.

On 24 May 2019, P62 was involved in the recovery of a WWII aircraft engine off the Grand Harbour. The engine, most probably that of a Short Sunderland flying boat, was retrieved after a 14-hour operation.

During 2020, the ship participated in joint training operations with the Royal Netherlands Navy and Hellenic Navy.

== See also ==
- LÉ Deirdre (P20)
- LÉ Emer (P21)
- LÉ Aisling (P23)
