= Roberta O'Brien =

First woman to reach commander in the Irish navy

Roberta O’Brien
- Born: Roberta O’Brien; Glen of Aherlow, County Tipperary
- Education: University College Galway, University College Cork
- Known for: First and highest ranking woman in the Irish Navy

Roberta O'Brien is the highest ranking woman in the Irish navy and the first woman to captain her own ship, and then to achieve the rank of Commander.

== Biography ==
Roberta O'Brien was born in the Glen of Aherlow in Tipperary c. 1977. She was educated in the Lisvernane National School and St Anne's Secondary School in Tipperary Town. O'Brien played on the Glen of Aherlow boys hurling team until she was fourteen. She joined in the Navy in 1995 with Orla Farrell, the only other woman to join, when it was first permitted. O'Brien qualified, with a science degree from University College Galway in 2000. O'Brien later also studied in University College Cork. O'Brien holds a master's degree in Leadership Management and Defence Studies and a HDip in management and marketing. Her uncle and his father worked in the Navy. O'Brien married another serviceman Peadar Ó Catháin, with whom she has three children. In 2008, O'Brien became the captain of the LÉ Aisling, becoming the first woman to become a captain in the Irish Navy. She became the first woman to be appointed a commander in the Irish Navy in 2020.
