= LÉ Aisling =

Former Irish patrol vessel; Now used by Libyan National Army

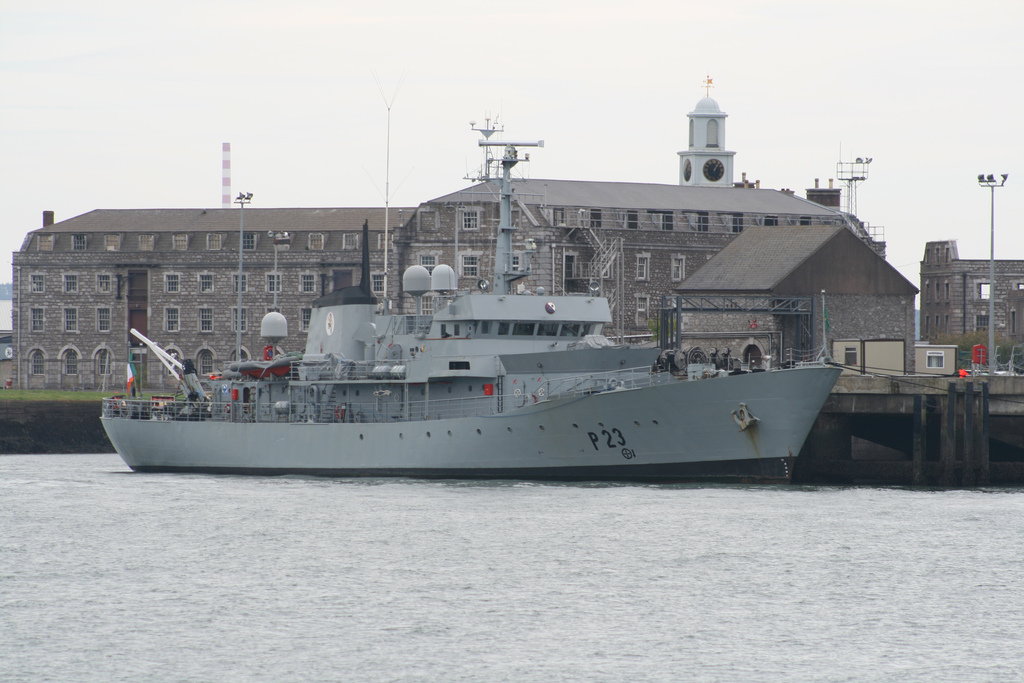
- Aisling at Haulbowline, September 2007

History

Ireland
- Name: LÉ Aisling
- Namesake: Aisling, a vision poem
- Builder: Verolme Dockyard, Cork
- Laid down: 31 January 1979
- Launched: 3 October 1979
- Commissioned: 21 May 1980
- Decommissioned: 22 June 2016
- Home port: Haulbowline Naval Base
- Identification: IMO number: 7820693; Pennant number: P23
- Fate: Decommissioned

Libya
- Name: Al-Karama
- Commissioned: May 2018
- Home port: Benghazi
- Identification: IMO number: 7820693; MMSI number: 357088000; Callsign: HO9840
- Status: in active service

General characteristics
- Class & type: Emer-class offshore patrol vessel
- Displacement: 1019.5 tonnes standard
- Length: 65.2 m (214 ft) overall
- Beam: 10.5 m (34 ft)
- Draught: 4.4 m (14 ft)
- Speed: 31.5 km/h (17.0 kn) maximum
- Complement: 46 (5 officers and 41 ratings)
- Armament: 1 × Bofors 40 mm Automatic Gun L/70; 2 × Rheinmetall Rh202 20 mm (0.79 in) Cannons; ?x 7.62 mm (0.300 in) GPMG

LÉ Aisling (Irish pronunciation: [ˈaʃl̠ʲəɲ]; meaning "[poetic] dream, vision"), now known as Al-Karama, was a patrol vessel in the Irish Naval Service from 1980 to 2016. She was built in Verolme Dockyard, Cork, Ireland in 1979 and originally named after Patrick Pearse's poem, "Aisling" to commemorate the centenary of his birth. During her career, Aisling participated in the Sonia and Marita Ann incidents, and was one of the first ships to arrive on the scene of the Air India Flight 182 disaster, and subsequently participated in recovery operations. She was the adopted ship of Galway, and officially decommissioned in her adopted city in June 2016.

In March 2017, stripped of arms and armaments, she was sold to a Dutch broker, and in May 2018 a United Arab Emirates company sold her to Khalifa Haftar's internationally unrecognised Libyan National Army, in violation of a UN arms embargo. She was reportedly commissioned as the Libyan National Army's flagship and named Al-Karama (dignity).

== Construction ==
There were three Emer Class offshore patrol vessels (Modified version of Deirdre Class) built for the Irish Naval Service; Aisling was the last, built at Verolme Dockyard in Cork. Offshore patrol vessels were designed to patrol the Irish EEZ. Aisling's main weapon system was a Bofors 40mm Cannon capable of firing 240 2.5 kg shells a minute at a range of 1 km. Her secondary weapons system included two Rheinmetall 20mm Cannons capable of firing 1000 shells per minute at the range of 2 km.

== Irish operational history ==
=== Marita Ann incident ===
During September 1984, the vessel was involved in the arrest of the Marita Ann off the southwest coast of Ireland, which carried a cargo of arms and ammunition consigned to the IRA. LÉ Emer, LÉ Aisling and LÉ Deirdre maintained some distance until the arms entered Irish territorial waters. The contraband had come from the United States, and crossed the Atlantic on a fishing trawler, the Valhalla. She did not approach the Irish coast, but transferred her illicit cargo to the Marita Ann outside Irish waters. The intelligence services were aware of the plot, and Valhalla's voyage had been monitored by international agencies, and the naval service had begun to lay a trap once the Marita Ann left Dingle. Aisling (Lt Cdr J.Robinson) and Emer left Haulbowline, with Gardaí onboard both vessels. Marita Ann's course was plotted and by midnight it was 1,800 yards into territorial waters. Emer made a full-speed intercept and when half-a-mile off the target, called on her to stop. Such signals were ignored, and the vessel, which when illuminated by Emer's searchlights was revealed as Marita Ann, altered course. The Marita Ann could not outrun either vessel, and Aisling moved into a position to prevent a breakout. After four rounds of tracer had been put across her bows, Marita Ann gave up two miles inside the limit. The Naval Service/Garda boarding party met no resistance, and found five men and a large quantity of ammunition and arms on board.

Two men, Martin Ferris and Gavin Mortimer were taken on board the Emer, John P. Crawley (a United States citizen) and John McCarthy were transferred to the Aisling, and Michael "Mike" Browne (aged 42) remained on the Marita Ann, which was towed by Aisling. The convoy, escorted by LE Deirdre, made its way to Haulbowline, Cobh, where a gathering of international media awaited its arrival.

=== Sonia incident ===
In 1984 LÉ Aisling was involved an international incident with a 330-ton Spanish fishing trawler called Sonia, based in the Basque port of Ondarroa. Aisling came across Sonia illegally fishing in Irish waters south of the Saltee Islands near County Wexford. Sonia quickly retrieved its gear before Aisling could send a boarding party. When Sonia got underway, she would have hit Aisling amidships had the patrol vessel's engines not been put full astern. As it was, Sonia missed Aisling by 10 feet (3 m), a small margin given the weather conditions. According to the captain, the heavy trawler's hull would have sliced Aisling's thin plating.

The episode continued with Aisling giving chase and firing 600 warning shots. Sonia turned towards Aisling numerous times causing the latter to take evasive action. After five hours pursuing the Sonia the captain of the Aisling was ordered to break off as she approached British waters.

When Aisling returned to its base in Haulbowline, Cobh that evening, news was fed back that Sonia sank due to sea conditions and both a German freighter and a Sea King helicopter flying out of RAF Brawdy had rescued the 13 crewmen. The Spaniards denied that any attempt had been made to ram Aisling and accused the Naval Service of causing their ship to sink by riddling it with gunfire. The Irish Government denied this, and the Minister for Foreign Affairs, Mr Peter Barry, TD, reiterated this to the Spanish Minister for Foreign Affairs, who happened to be in Luxembourg negotiating Spain's entry to the European Economic Community.

=== Decommissioning from Irish service ===
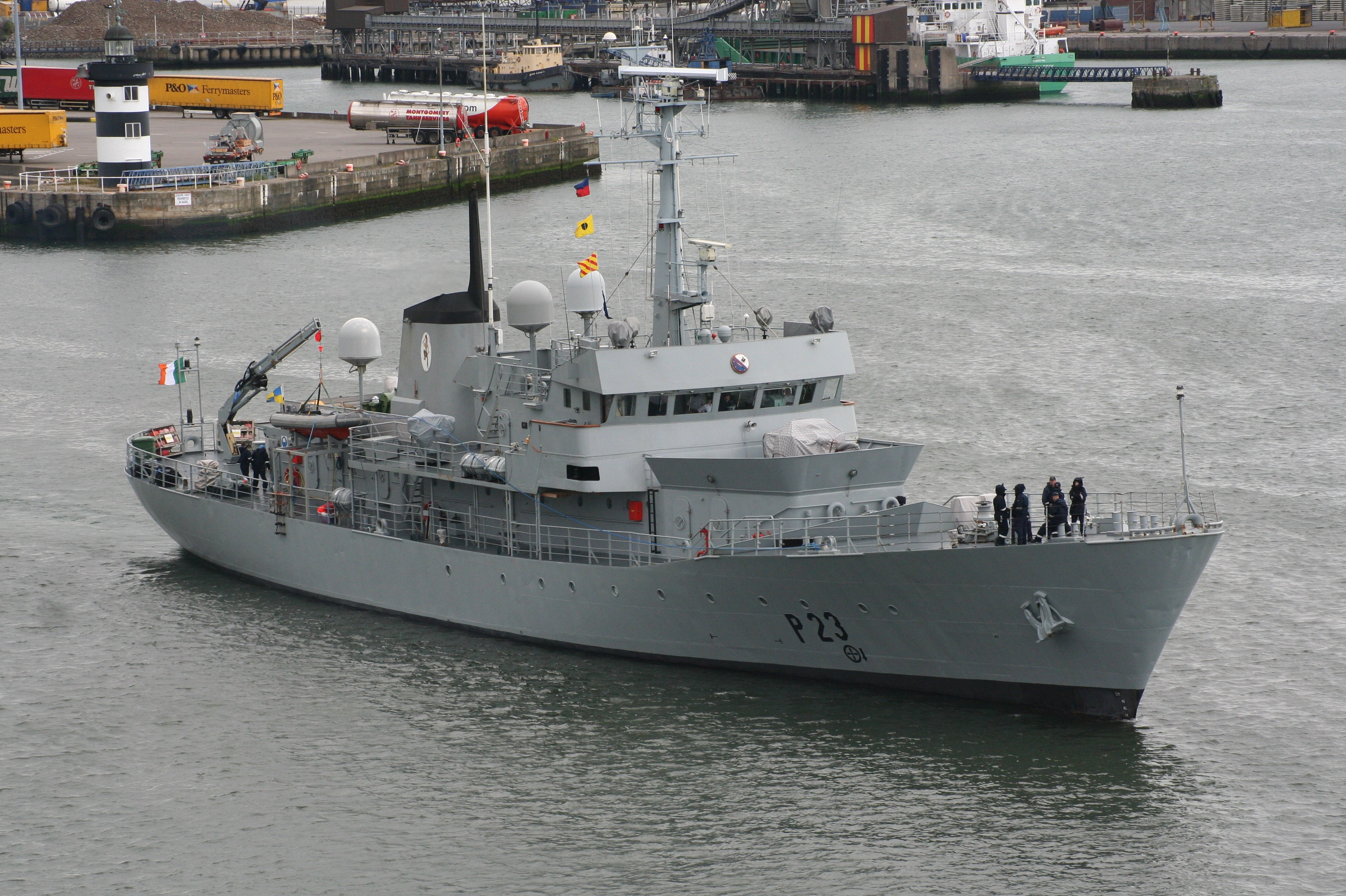
Aisling at Dublin, July 2009

Lieutenant Commander Roberta O'Brien, the state's first female commander of a Naval Service ship, took command of LÉ Aisling in 2008.

The vessel was officially decommissioned in its adopted city of Galway in June 2016.

At the time of decommissioning, a proposal was made to potentially convert Aisling into a museum ship in Galway as a tourist attraction. However, while representatives of the Department of Defence advised that the proposal was "under consideration" as of December 2016, it was noted that the vessels of the type may be "unsuitable for conversion to use as museums or visitor attractions".

== Sale and Libyan service ==
Aisling was put up for a public auction on 23 March 2017 at the Carrigaline Hotel in County Cork, and was purchased by a Dutch broker for his clients for a reported price of €110,000, there being no other higher bids. As of 10 May 2017, the vessel was listed on a brokerage website with an asking price of $750,000 (€685,000), with the difference between sale price and asking price attracting attention from representative groups.

In 2018 LÉ Aisling was commissioned, under the name Al Karama (Arabic: الكرامة, romanized: al-karāma, lit. 'dignity'), as the flagship of the Libyan National Army's Navy.

== See also ==
- LÉ Deirdre (P20)
- LÉ Emer (P21)
- LÉ Aoife (P22)

== Sources ==
- MacGinty, Tom. (1995) The Irish Navy - A story of courage and tenacity, 1st Irish Ed., Tralee: Kerryman; ISBN 0-946277-22-2, Chapter 18.
