= HMCS Chicoutimi =

Several Canadian naval units have been named HMCS Chicoutimi.

- HMCS Chicoutimi (K156) (I) was a Flower-class corvette that served with the Royal Canadian Navy during the Second World War; commissioned in 1940 and retired in 1945.
- HMCS Chicoutimi (SSK 879) (II) is a Victoria-class submarine serving in the Canadian Forces since 1998; originally commissioned as HMS Upholder (S40).

== Battle honours ==
- Atlantic, 1941–44.
