= LÉ Emer =

Ship built in 1977

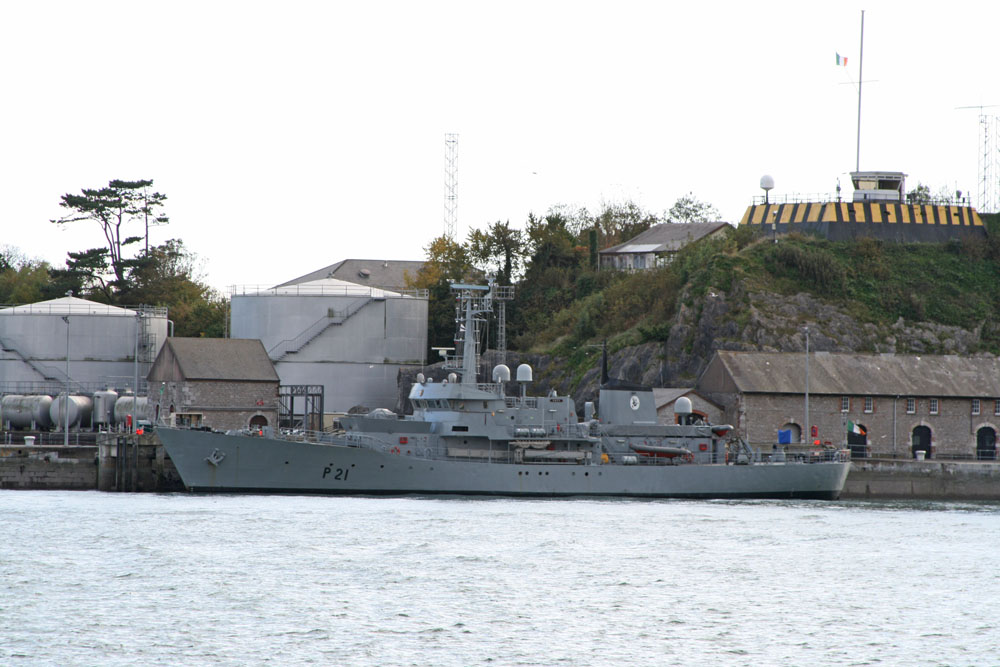
- Emer at Haulbowline in October 2007

History

Ireland
- Name: LÉ Emer
- Namesake: Emer, the principal wife of Cúchulainn
- Builder: Verolme Dockyard, Cork
- Yard number: 29
- Laid down: 28 February 1977
- Launched: 26 September 1977
- Commissioned: 16 January 1978
- Decommissioned: 20 September 2013
- Home port: Haulbowline Naval Base
- Identification: IMO number: 7602297; Hull number: P21
- Fate: Discarded 2013

Nigeria
- Name: NNS Prosperity
- Acquired: Seized 2014
- Commissioned: 19 February 2015
- Identification: IMO number: 7602297; MMSI number: 657102900; Hull number: A497
- Status: in active service

General characteristics
- Class & type: Emer-class offshore patrol vessel
- Displacement: 1,019.5 tonnes Standard
- Length: 65.2 m (214 ft) overall
- Beam: 10.5 m (34 ft)
- Draught: 4.4 m (14 ft)
- Speed: 31.5 km/h (17.0 kn) maximum
- Complement: 46 (5 officers and 41 ratings )
- Armament: 1 × Bofors L40/70; 2 × Rheinemetall RH202 20 mm cannons; MAG58 7.62 mm

LÉ Emer (P21) of the Irish Naval Service, now known as NNS Prosperity of the Nigerian Navy, was built as a patrol vessel in Verolme Dockyard, Cork, Ireland in 1977.

After evaluating Deirdre for 3 years, Emer was ordered by the Irish Naval Service in 1975. Commissioned in January 1978, she was named after Emer, the principal wife of Cúchulainn, a legendary Irish folk hero.

She was an improved version of the sole of class Deirdre and similar to LÉ Aoife (P22) and LÉ Aisling (P23). She was commissioned on 16 January 1978 and had 35 years of service with the Irish Naval Service.

Decommissioned on 20 September 2013, in October 2013 Emer was sold at auction for €320,000 to a Nigerian businessman.

In July 2014 Emer was impounded by the Nigerian Navy because the new owner had failed to secure the necessary military approval before bringing the ship into Nigerian waters. On 19 February 2015 Emer was commissioned into the Nigerian Navy as a training ship and renamed NNS Prosperity.

== See also ==
- LÉ Deirdre (P20)
- LÉ Aoife (P22)
- LÉ Aisling (P23)
