= Christopher Matthews (businessman) =

British businessman, principally in internet services (1950 – 2004)

Christopher Matthews (c. 1950 – 6 August 2004) was a British businessman, principally in internet services and dating agencies. He died in a helicopter crash in Wisconsin in August 2004.

Matthews, the son of a statistician, was born in Cheshire. After education at St John's School, Leatherhead, Surrey, he gained a degree in engineering and then went on to work for the Marconi Company and for the Courtaulds Group.

In 1992 from a base in Macclesfield, Cheshire, Matthews founded Club Sirius, a dating agency for single professionals, which quickly became very profitable. He later acquired Dateline and others which were combined into the OneSaturday Group. Although Matthews sold OneSaturday shortly before his death, most of his wealth came from internet service company Telinco, which he sold for £250 million to World Online in 2000, shortly before the Dot-com crash. Other ventures included aviation company Cav-Air of Fort Lauderdale, Florida, and boatyard Seastream in Southampton, England.

From 1998 Matthews lived as a tax exile on his yacht Tosca III in the Mediterranean and Caribbean. In 2001 Seastream purchased the former Irish naval patrol boat Deirdre for conversion to a large yacht, renaming her Tosca IV. Following Matthews' death the part-converted vessel was sold.

He was married to Marie-France, with whom he had three of his four children.

Piloting an EC130 helicopter registered N450CM, Matthews died aged 54, along with his aide Jim Beauregard, when it crashed at Sauk Prairie after hitting power lines over Lake Wisconsin on 6 August 2004. The subsequent investigation found that the helicopter was being flown inexplicably low.
