= HMCS Chicoutimi (SSK 879) =

Royal Canadian Navy hunter-killer submarine

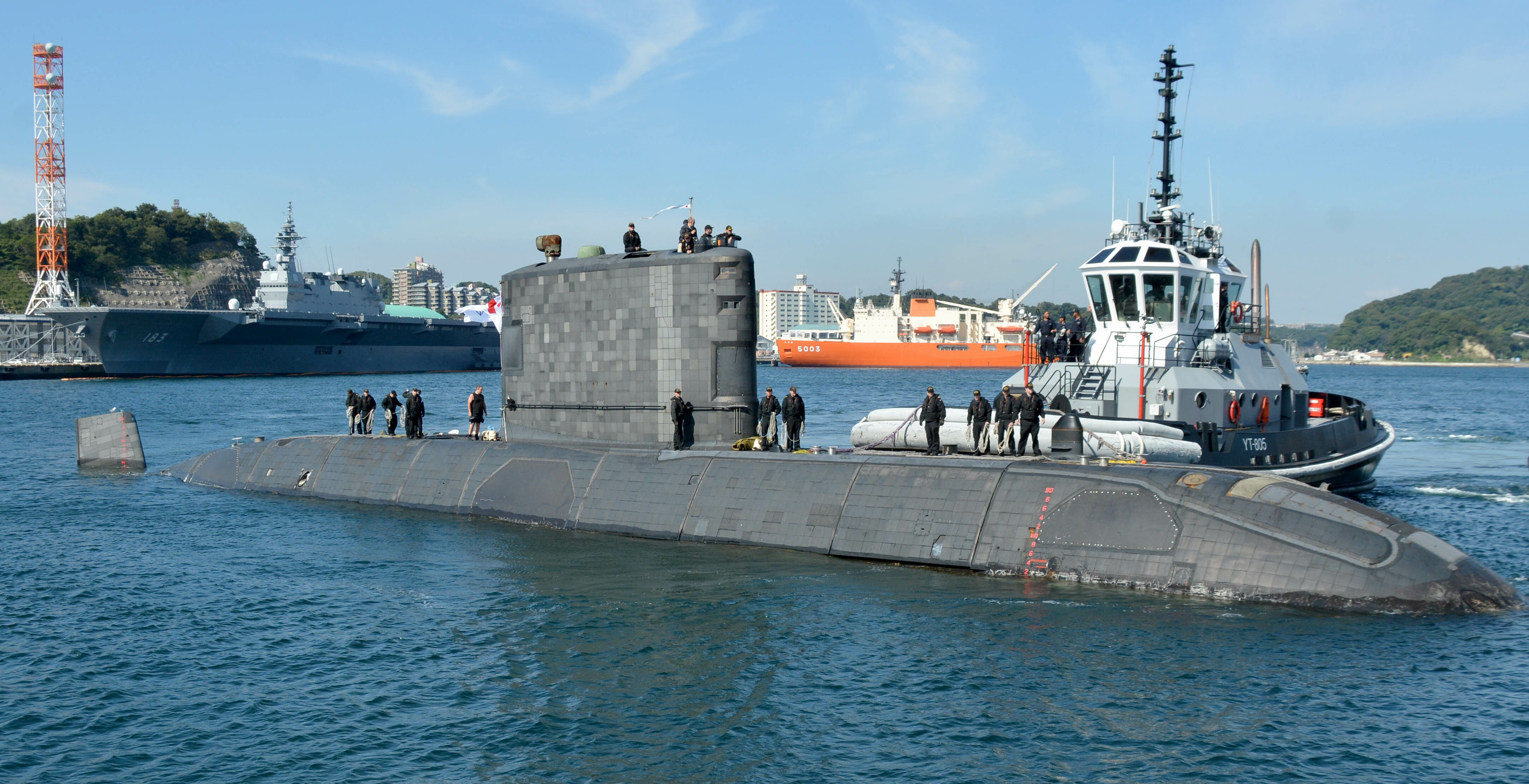
- HMCS Chicoutimi at Yokosuka, October 2017

History

United Kingdom
- Name: Upholder
- Builder: VSEL, Barrow-in-Furness
- Laid down: February 1983
- Launched: 2 December 1986
- Commissioned: 7 December 1990
- Decommissioned: 29 April 1994
- Identification: Pennant number S40
- Fate: Transferred to Canada
- Badge

Canada
- Name: Chicoutimi
- Acquired: 1998
- Commissioned: 3 September 2015
- Identification: Hull number SSK 879
- Motto: Maître du Domaine
- Honours and awards: Atlantic, 1941–44
- Status: Ship in active service
- Badge

General characteristics
- Class & type: Upholder/Victoria-class submarine
- Displacement: 2,260 long tons (2,296 t) surfaced; 2,500 long tons (2,540 t) submerged
- Length: 230 ft 7 in (70.28 m)
- Beam: 23 ft 7 in (7.19 m)
- Draught: 24 ft 11 in (7.59 m)
- Speed: 12 knots (22 km/h; 14 mph) surfaced; 20 kn (23 mph; 37 km/h) submerged
- Complement: 48 officers and crew, plus 7 trainees
- Armament: 6 × 21 in (533 mm) torpedo tubes; 18 × Mark 48 torpedoes

HMCS Chicoutimi is a Victoria-class long-range hunter-killer (SSK) submarine of the Royal Canadian Navy, originally built and operated by the Royal Navy as HMS Upholder. Shortly after being handed over by the United Kingdom to Canada, she was involved in a partial flooding incident which resulted in a fire at sea. The incident sparked a fierce debate over the value of the purchase of this group of second-hand vessels, as well as the handover inspection process. The subsequent investigation "determined the fire was caused by human, technical and operational factors, [and] the board cleared the commanding officer and crew of any blame." The submarine was repaired and entered Canadian service in 2015.

== Design and description ==
As built the Upholder/Victoria class was designed as a replacement for the Oberon class for use as hunter-killer and training subs. The submarines, which have a single-skinned, teardrop-shaped hull, displace 2,220 long tons (2,260 t) surfaced and 2,455 long tons (2,494 t) submerged. They are 230 feet 7 inches (70.3 m) long overall with a beam of 25 feet 0 inches (7.6 m) and a draught of 17 feet 8 inches (5.4 m).

The submarines are powered by a one shaft diesel-electric system. They are equipped with two Paxman Valenta 1600 RPS SZ diesel engines each driving a 1.4-megawatt (1,900 hp) GEC electric alternator with two 120-cell chloride batteries. The batteries have a 90-hour endurance at 3 knots (5.6 km/h; 3.5 mph). The ship is propelled by a 4.028-megawatt (5,402 hp) GEC dual armature electric motor turning a seven-blade fixed pitch propeller. They have a 200-long-ton (200 t) diesel capacity. This gives the subs a maximum speed of 12 knots (22 km/h; 14 mph) on the surface and 20 knots (37 km/h; 23 mph) submerged. They have a range of 8,000 nautical miles (15,000 km; 9,200 mi) at 8 knots (15 km/h; 9.2 mph) and 10,000 nautical miles (19,000 km; 12,000 mi) at snorting depth. The class has a reported dive depth of over 650 feet (200 m).

The Upholder/Victoria class are armed with six 21-inch (533 mm) torpedo tubes. In British service, the submarines were equipped with 14 Tigerfish Mk 24 Mod 2 torpedoes and four UGM-84 Sub-Harpoon missiles. They could also be adapted for use as a minelayer. The submarines have Type 1007 radar and Type 2040, Type 2019, Type 2007 and Type 2046 sonar installed. The hull is fitted with elastomeric acoustic tiles to reduce acoustic signature. In British service the vessels had a complement of 7 officers and 40 ratings.

=== Refits and Canadian alterations ===
During the refit for Canadian service, the Sub-Harpoon and mine capabilities were removed and the submarines were equipped with the Lockheed Martin Librascope Submarine fire-control system (SFCS) to meet the operational requirements of the Canadian Navy. Components from the fire control system of the Oberon-class submarines were installed. This gave the submarines the ability to fire the Gould Mk 48 Mod 4 torpedo. In 2014, the Government of Canada purchased 12 upgrade kits that will allow the submarines to fire the Mk 48 Mod 7AT torpedoes.

These radar and sonar systems were later upgraded with the installation of the BAE Type 2007 array and the Type 2046 towed array. The Canadian Towed Array Sonar (CANTASS) has been integrated into the towed sonar suite. The Upholder-class submarines were equipped with the CK035 electro-optical search periscope and the CH085 optronic attack periscope, originally supplied by Pilkington Optronics. After the Canadian refit, the submarines were equipped with Canadian communication equipment and electronic support measures (ESM). This included two SSE decoy launchers and the AR 900 ESM.

== Construction and career ==
The submarine was built for the Royal Navy as HMS Upholder (S40), the lead ship of the Upholder (2400) class of submarines, the second vessel to bear the name in the Royal Navy. The submarine was laid down by Vickers Shipbuilding and Engineering Ltd (VSEL) in February 1983 and launched on 2 December 1986. During construction, work on the submarine was delayed due to a labour strike. Upholder commissioned into the Royal Navy on 7 December 1990. Her commissioning was delayed due to a problem with the operation of the torpedo tubes, which had to be welded closed to prevent sea water entering the submarine.

Upholder was decommissioned on 29 April 1994 as a financial measure, following the end of the Cold-War and subsequent cancellation of the programme and amidst some controversy. The entire class was declared surplus to requirements in 1994.

=== Royal Canadian Navy ===
The British government was looking to discontinue the operation of diesel-electric boats and offered to sell Upholder and her sister submarines to Canada in 1993. The offer was accepted in 1998. The four boats were leased to Canada for US$427 million (plus US$98 million for upgrades and alteration to Canadian standards), with the lease to run for eight years; after this, the submarines would be sold for £1.

Problems were discovered with the piping welds on all four submarines, which delayed the reactivation of Upholder and her three sisters. Upholder was the last to be restored. When work commenced on the submarine, internal steelwork was found to be corroded, hull valves were cracked, air turbine pumps were defective, and equipment was missing that had been used to refit sister boat HMCS Corner Brook (ex-Ursula).

Upholder was renamed HMCS Chicoutimi, in honour of the city of Chicoutimi, Quebec (now a borough of the city of Saguenay).

==== October 2004 fire ====
Fire damage, October 2004

Chicoutimi was the last of the newly renamed Victoria-class vessels to complete the refit and was handed over to Maritime Command on 2 October 2004 at Faslane Naval Base. Two days later, Chicoutimi set sail for her new home port at CFB Halifax in Nova Scotia.

On 5 October, Chicoutimi was running on the surface, through heavy seas 100 miles (160 km) north-west of County Mayo, Ireland. While underway, it was noticed that an upper conning tower vent had a loose locking nut which prevented the boat from running submerged safely. A repair party was formed to tighten the nut, but the team did not have the correct tools, prolonging the repair. During this time, both hatches in the bridge fin lock-out chamber were open. Two crewmembers were working in the tower keeping an eye on the sea, ready to shut lids as required. Despite their efforts, a higher than usual wave up-welled inside the fin causing an estimated 2,000 litres (440 imp gal; 530 US gal) of seawater to pour into the submarine. The seawater pooled in the control room, which in turn started a major fire and caused all power to cut out, leaving the submarine adrift. Nine crewmembers were affected by smoke inhalation and the submarine was left drifting without power in heavy seas.

The RNLI lifeboat Sam and Ada Moody, stationed on Achill Island, County Mayo was put on standby to assist, but was later stood down. An Irish Navy ship, LÉ Róisín, responded to the submarine's mayday signal and set out to assist it, but was seriously damaged by the rough seas and forced to return to harbour. The only other Irish Navy ships available to help, LÉ Aoife and LÉ Niamh were patrolling off Ireland's southern coast. At 2 p.m. local time, the Royal Navy frigate HMS Montrose and the auxiliary vessel RFA Wave Knight reached the crippled Chicoutimi, with an additional three British ships en route. LÉ Aoife later reached the area and took over coordination of the rescue and salvage efforts. Other British ships dispatched to assist the submarine were HMS Marlborough and RFA Argus, as well as a number of specialist vessels to handle the situation. The rough conditions in the North Atlantic were impeding efforts to rescue the surfaced Chicoutimi, and a former Canadian naval officer said of Chicoutimi that "[it's] not [a] good surface rider at all. It's by no means unsafe; it's just very uncomfortable."

Three of the crew were airlifted by a Royal Navy helicopter for medical treatment after their condition deteriorated. Its original destination was Derry, Northern Ireland, but the helicopter diverted to Sligo, Ireland after one crewman became severely ill. The three crewmen were taken to Sligo General Hospital, where one of the crewmen was pronounced dead. The other two were admitted to the hospital, where one was listed in "critical" condition and placed in the intensive care unit, while another was reported as being in a "stable" condition.

By the evening of 7 October, the weather had abated, and Chicoutimi was taken in tow by the HM Coastguard tugboat Anglian Prince to return to Faslane Naval Base in Scotland. The tow was later taken over by the United States Submarine Support Vessel MV Carolyn Chouest, which was able to increase the towing speed from 3 knots (5.6 km/h) to 8 or 9 knots (15 or 17 km/h), and reached Faslane on the evening of 10 October. Chicoutimi was escorted into the Royal Navy base by HMCS St. John's, a Canadian frigate which rushed across the Atlantic after the navy learned of the fire.

Following claims made in the Canadian media about the cause of the fire, blaming the United Kingdom for supplying an unsafe vessel, the situation was further exacerbated by controversial comments made by the UK's Secretary of State for Defence, Geoff Hoon. Hoon accompanied his condolences for the crewman with a proposal that the Royal Navy would charge Canada for the cost of the rescue while also stating that Canada as the buyer had to beware. In Canada, many Second World War veterans were outraged by his comments. As well as promoting speculation regarding problems with the Victoria class, the incident also sparked debate in Ireland over the country's lack of a rescue tug at that time.

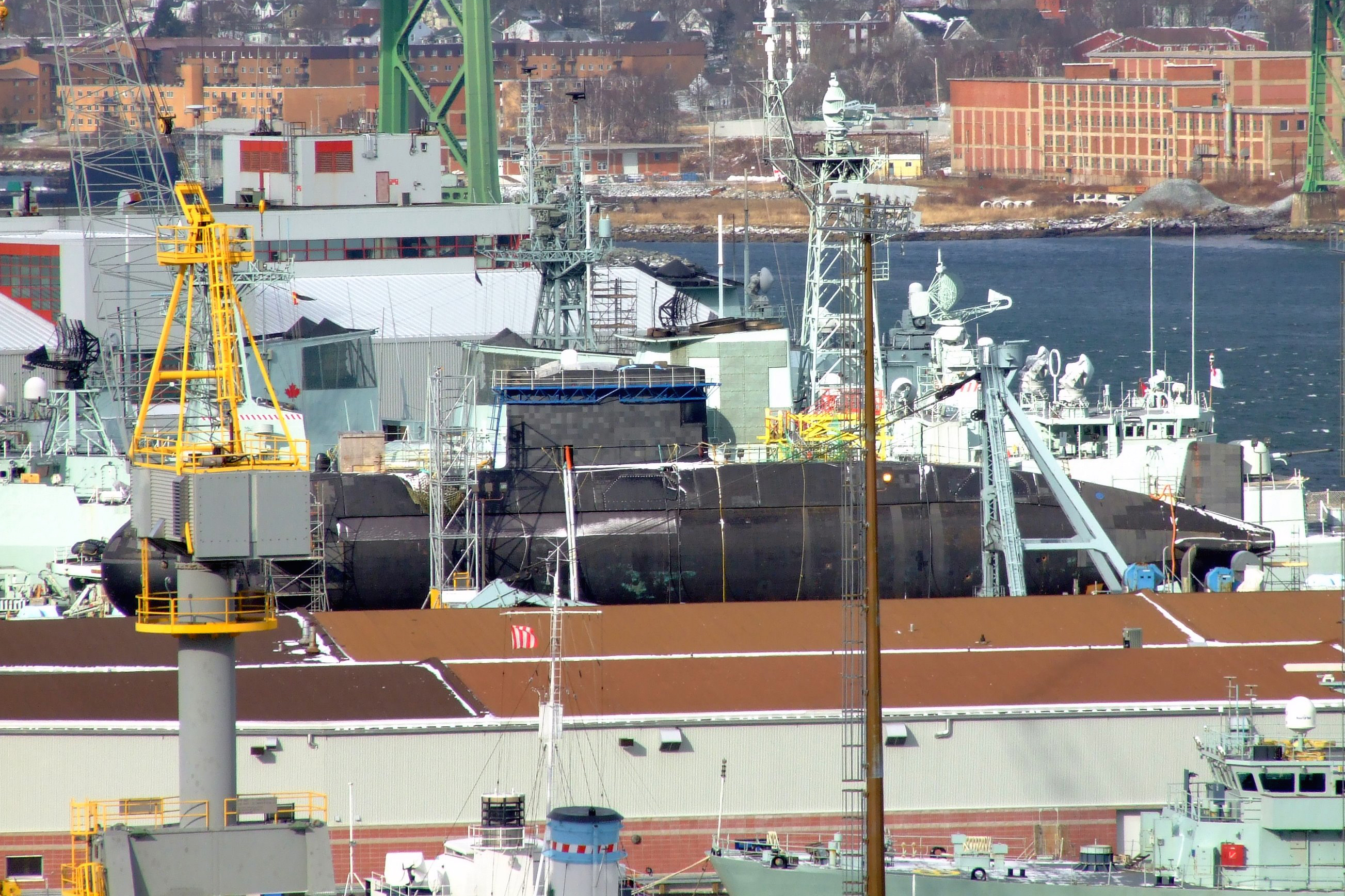
HMCS Chicoutimi at HMC Dockyard, Halifax, in early 2007

After some repairs were made at Faslane, the Department of National Defence contracted Eide Marine Services to transport Chicoutimi aboard the submersible heavy lift ship Eide Transporter to Halifax. She departed Faslane on 13 January 2005 and arrived in Halifax on 1 February, where she was dry docked at HMC Dockyard for further work.

A year after the incident, a Canadian board of inquiry found that Chicoutimi was travelling on the surface with two hatches open so that crewmembers could repair an air vent on the submarine's conning tower, an issue that had not been addressed during the British refit of the vessel. An unexpected rogue wave arrived during this time and sent water down the open hatches. This partially flooded two compartments and created a short circuit in electrical connectors that the British had only applied one layer of waterproof sealant to, rather than the recommended three. The board of inquiry concluded that "a combination of human, technical and operational factors ... led to a tragic death", in the words of the-then Chief of the Maritime Staff Bruce MacLean, and that Chicoutimi's captain Luc Pelletier was not at fault. Sailors who fought the fire aboard the submarine suffered higher levels of post-traumatic stress syndrome and asthma in the years following the incident.

==== 2009 transfer to Victoria ====
In April 2006 the Department of National Defence announced that repairs to Chicoutimi would be deferred until 2010 when the submarine was to undergo a previously scheduled two-year Extended Docking Work Period (refit).

From 2006 to 2008 the Department of Public Works and Government Services worked with the Department of National Defence (DND) to issue a Request for Proposal for the Victoria Class In-Service Support Contract Project (VISSC). The result of this RFP saw the VISSC awarded in June 2008 to the Canadian Submarine Maintenance Group (CSMG), a private-sector consortium led by Babcock Marine and Weir Canada Inc. The initial five-year contract for the VISSC will see CSMG establish a submarine maintenance and repair facility at DND's graving dock at CFB Esquimalt near Victoria, British Columbia. The DND graving dock is operated by Washington Marine Group as Victoria Shipyards Inc.

Under the terms of the VISSC, CSMG contracted Dockwise USA Inc to transport Chicoutimi from Halifax to Esquimalt. On 1 April 2009 Chicoutimi was loaded aboard the submersible heavy lift ship Tern in Bedford Basin. Tern departed Halifax on 5 April 2009 and arrived in Esquimalt on 29 April 2009 where Chicoutimi was transferred to the CSMG facility.

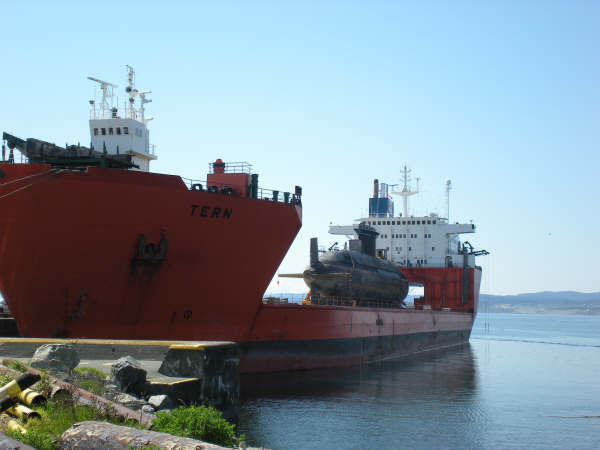
MV Tern, carrying HMCS Chicoutimi, docked at Ogden Point, Victoria, British Columbia

In January 2014 it was announced that Chicoutimi was repaired and was being prepared to be handed back over to the navy. However, the boat would be limited to shallow-water diving for the foreseeable future. It was announced on 28 September 2014 that the submarine began sea trials that would take seven-to-eight weeks to complete. On 7 December 2014 the Ottawa Citizen reported that HMCS Chicoutimi had completed her sea trials and was handed over to the Royal Canadian Navy on 3 December 2014. The boat was officially commissioned into the Royal Canadian Navy on 3 September 2015.

==== Operational service ====
In October 2015, Chicoutimi, along with HMCS Calgary and HMCS Vancouver, participated in the United States Navy's Task Group Exercise, a naval exercise held off southern California. In 2015, problems with welds were discovered aboard Chicoutimi and sister boat Victoria. Both submarines were docked to undergo repairs and Chicoutimi began training exercises in December 2016.

In May 2017, Chicoutimi returned to port after problems arose with the main battery while conducting operations at sea. On 15 June 2017, while Chicoutimi was docked at CFB Esquimalt, the Orca-class patrol vessel Cougar struck the submarine as it was exiting the dockyard. The initial inspection following the collision showed only superficial damage to the protective gear around the submarine. To deal with the ongoing battery issues aboard Chicoutimi, the main battery was transferred from sister boat Victoria. On 7 October 2017, CBC News reported that Chicoutimi had been sent on a first-ever operational patrol to Asia. Chicoutimi made a port visit to Yokosuka, Japan while deployed to Asia, marking the first time in 50 years a Canadian submarine has visited the country. The submarine was deployed off the coast of North Korea recording airport departures and arrivals and monitoring sea traffic. The submarine returned to CFB Esquimalt on 21 March 2018.

== Heraldry ==
'Unofficial' badge designed by Lt Cdr Wanklyn, in about 1941.

=== HMS Upholder (S40) ===
The precursor of Upholder (S40) was HMS Upholder (P37). In 1941 Upholder (P37) was granted a badge which contained a caryatid. The ship's captain, Lieutenant Commander Malcolm Wanklyn, described the badge as "an armless Greek bint standing in a dustbin"; and designed his own unofficial badge for the ship. Upholder (S40) originally sailed under the earlier Upholder's official badge, yet was allowed to sail under the badge designed by Wanklyn.

=== HMCS Chicoutimi (SSK 879) ===
Badge design of Chicoutimi

The badge's blue and white "V" is in reference to the Victoria-class submarines and the colours of Quebec. The bear represents the bears which are indigenous to the Chicoutimi area. The bear protects a fleur-de-lis and stands upon waves; representing the lakes and rivers in the Chicoutimi region as well as the maritime environment in which the submarine operates.

The badge of Chicoutimi is blazoned:

Azure in front of a pile argent bordered throughout by a letter "V" also argent fimbriated azure surmounting three bars wavy in base argent a bear rampant sable holding in the forepaws a fleur-de-lis azure.

The colours of Chicoutimi are blue and white. The motto of Chicoutimi is maître du domaine, which translates into English as "master of the domain".

== See also ==
- Major submarine incidents since 2000
