= LÉ Setanta =

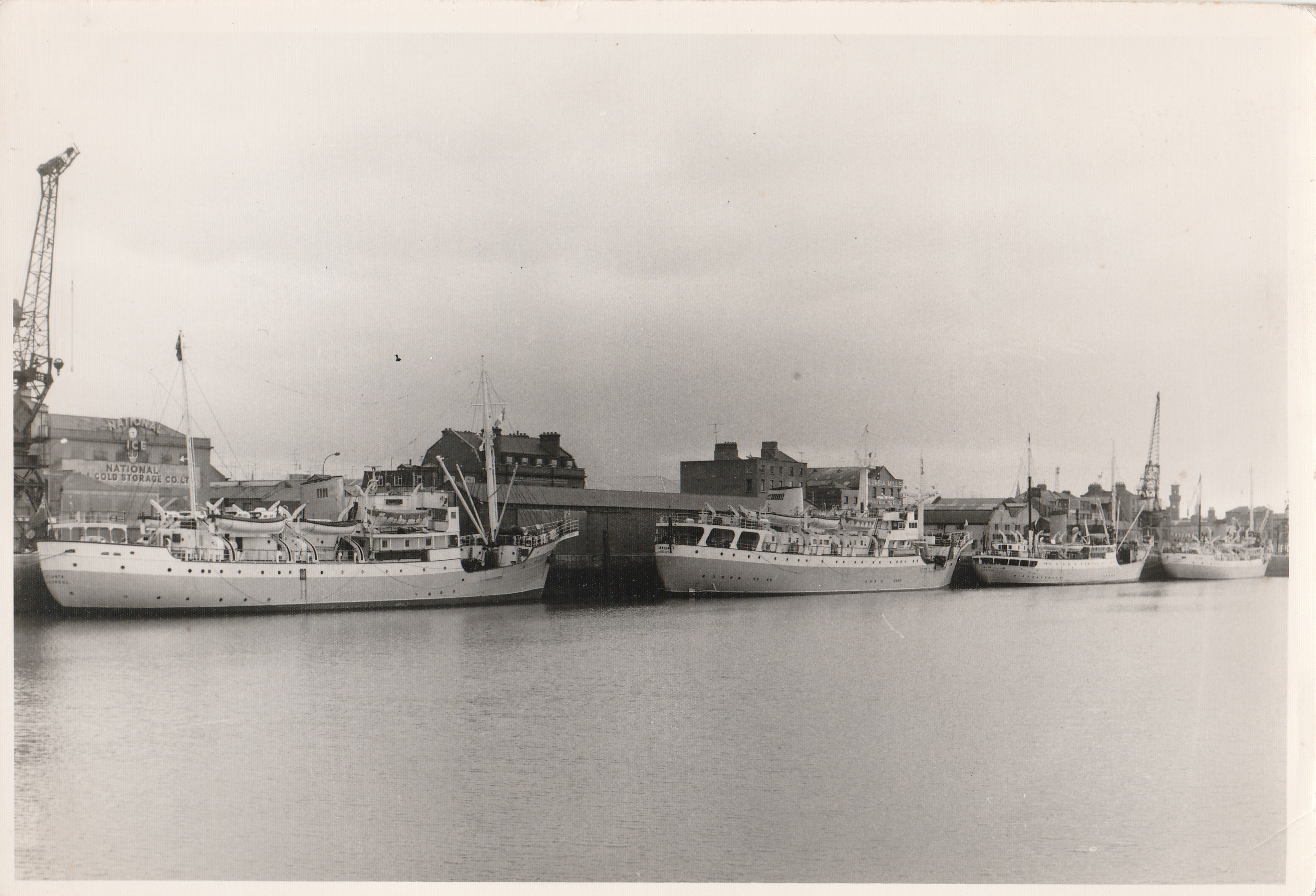
- Commissioners of Irish Lights fleet on the South Wall, Dublin, 1971; ILT Isolda at far left

History

Republic of Ireland
- Name: Isolda
- Namesake: Iseult
- Builder: Liffey Dockyard, Dublin
- Launched: 1953

History

Ireland
- Name: Setanta
- Namesake: Sétanta (Cú Chulainn)
- Acquired: 1976
- Decommissioned: 1984
- Identification: A15
- Fate: Sold for scrapping 1984

General characteristics
- Type: lighthouse tender, then auxiliary ship
- Displacement: 1,173 tons
- Length: 63.4 m (208 ft) overall
- Beam: 11.6 m (38 ft)
- Depth: 4 m (13 ft)
- Installed power: 1,500 hp
- Propulsion: reciprocating steam engine
- Speed: 11.4 kn (21.1 km/h) maximum
- Complement: 44
- Armament: 2 × Oerlikon 20 mm cannon

LÉ Setanta (A15) was an auxiliary ship and training ship in the Irish Naval Service. She was named after Sétanta (Cú Chulainn), a mythical hero of the Ulster Cycle.

Liffey Dockyard in Dublin built her in 1953 as a lighthouse tender for the Commissioners of Irish Lights. She was launched as ILT Isolda, named after the mythical Irish princess Iseult.

In 1976 the INS bought her, had her armed with two Oerlikon 20 mm cannon and renamed her Setanta. She served until 1984 when the INS sold her to Haulbowline Industries Ltd of Cork for scrap.

== Bibliography ==
- McIvor, Aidan (1994). A History of the Irish Naval Service. Dublin: Irish Academic Press. ISBN 0-7165-2523-2.
