= LÉ Róisín =

1999 Róisín-class offshore patrol vessel

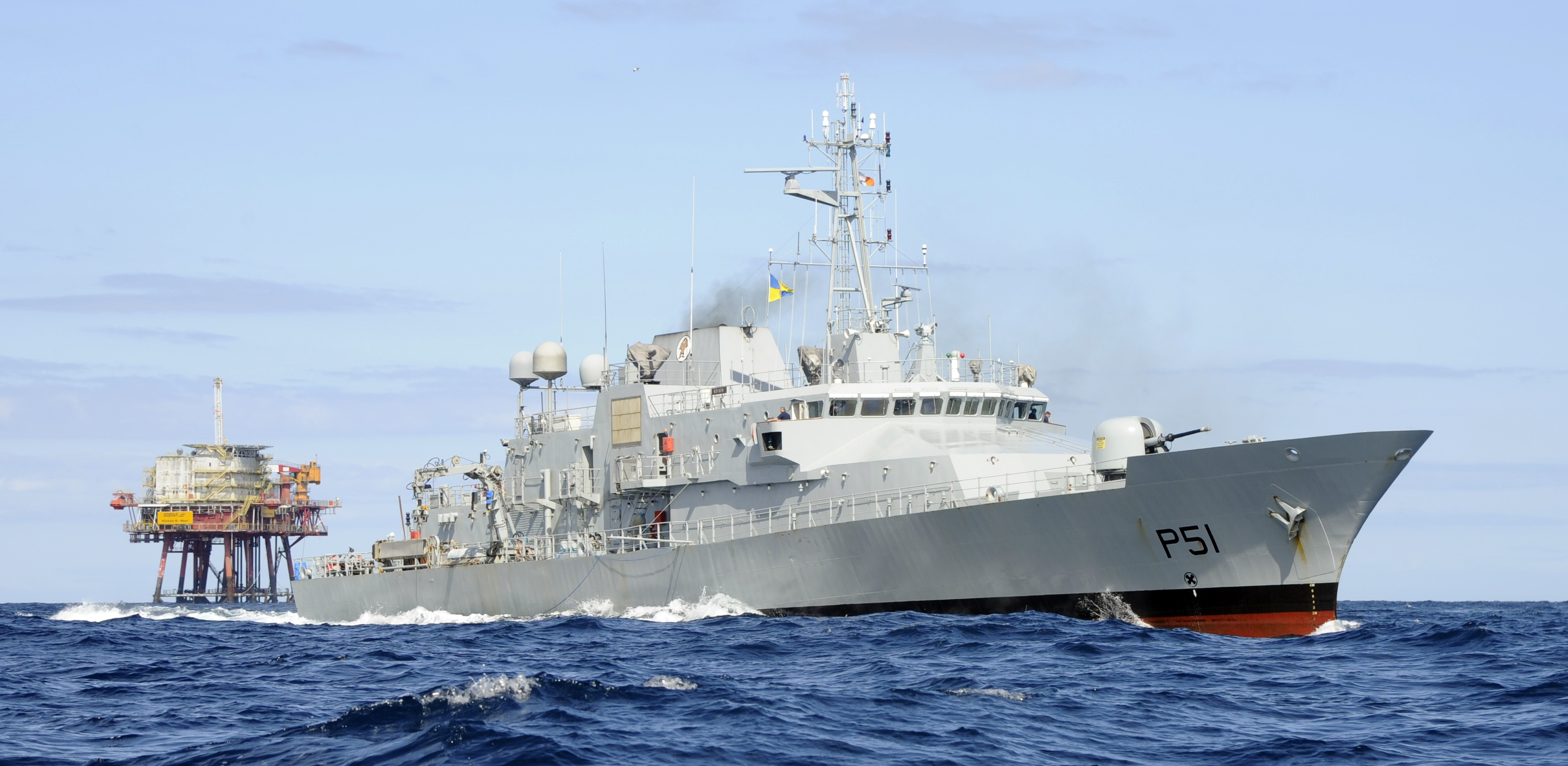
- The LÉ Róisín on patrol

History

Ireland
- Name: LÉ Róisín
- Namesake: Róisín Dúbh, daughter of Red Hugh O’Neill
- Builder: Appledore Shipbuilders, North Devon
- Commissioned: 15 December 1999
- Home port: Haulbowline Naval Base
- Identification: IMO number: 9192923; MMSI number: 250180000; Callsign: EIWN; Pennant number: P51
- Status: "Operational reserve" as of January 2023

General characteristics
- Class & type: Róisín-class offshore patrol vessel
- Displacement: 1,500 tonnes Standard
- Length: 78.84 m (258 ft 8 in) overall
- Beam: 14.00 m (45 ft 11 in)
- Draught: 3.8 m (12 ft 6 in)
- Installed power: 10,000 kW (13,000 hp)
- Propulsion: Wärtsilä medium speed diesels
- Speed: 42.6 km/h (23.0 kn) maximum
- Range: 11,000 km (6,000 nmi)
- Boats & landing craft carried: 2 Delta 6.5 m (21 ft 4 in) RHIBs; 1 Avon 5.4 m (17 ft 9 in) RHIB
- Complement: 44 (6 officers and 38 ratings)
- Sensors & processing systems: kelvin Hughes radar
- Armament: 1 × 76 mm OTO Melara Cannon; 2 × 20 mm Rheinmetall Rh202 cannon; 2 × 12.7 mm HMG; 4 × 7.62 mm GPMG
- Aviation facilities: None

LÉ Róisín (P51) is the lead ship of her class of offshore patrol vessel in the Irish Naval Service. Commissioned in 1999, the ship's primary mission is fisheries protection, search and rescue, and maritime protection operations, including vessel boardings. Róisín or Róisín Dubh, is often used as an allegory for Ireland. However, the original Róisín Dubh was a daughter of Red Hugh O’Neill, Earl of Tyrone in the late 16th century.

== Design ==
The ship was designed by STX Canada Marine (now Vard Marine) and has an all-steel hull based on the Mauritian Vigilant patrol vessel launched in 1995, but without the helicopter deck and hangar facilities. The level of automation incorporated into the ship's systems allows the ship to be operated with just 47 crew including eight officers. The vessel is designed for winter North Atlantic operations.

== Weapon systems ==
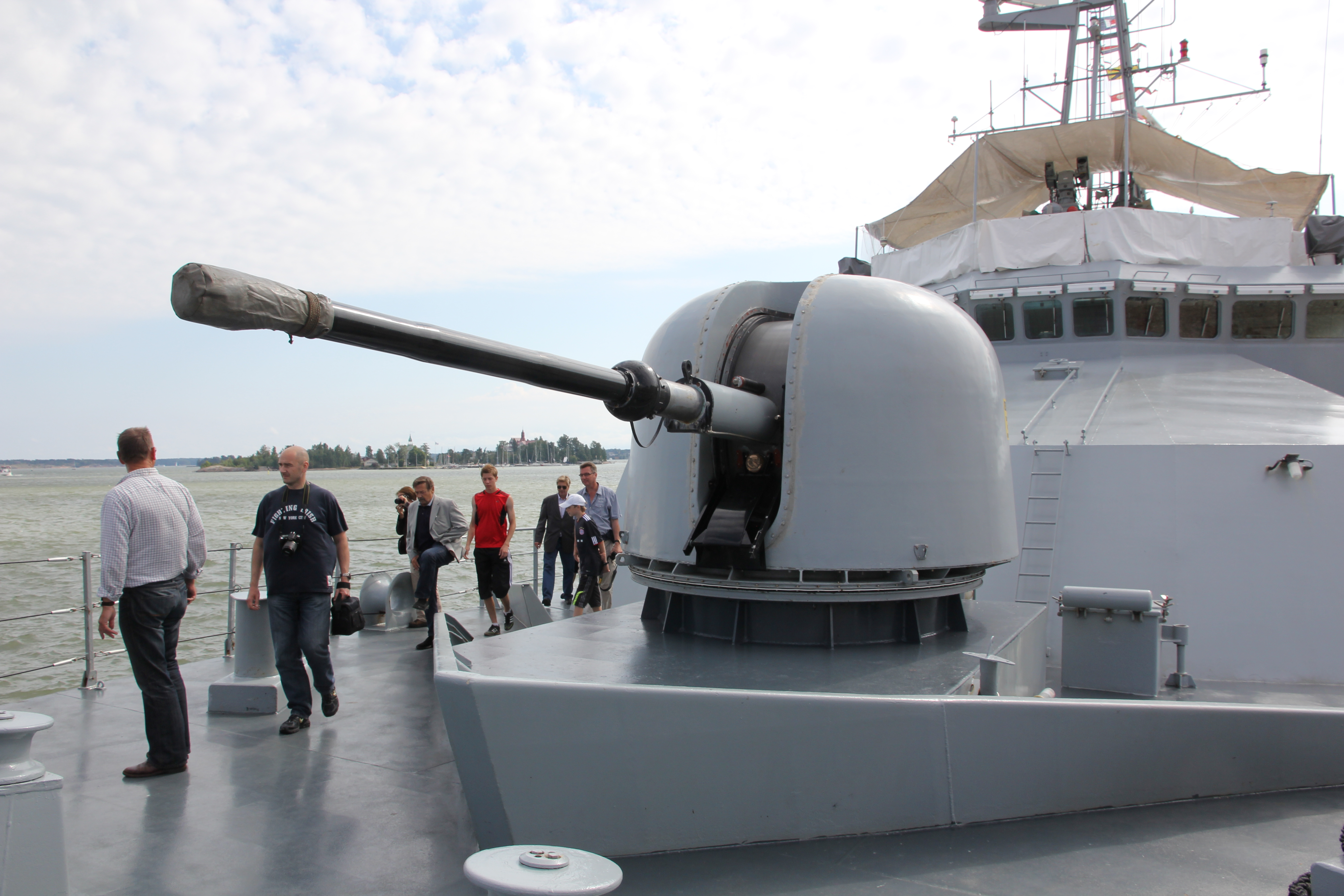
Otobreda 76 mm bow gun of LÉ Róisin

The ship is armed with an OTO Melara 76 mm gun dual-purpose gun installed on the bow gun deck. The gun fires 6 kg (13 lb) shells and is capable of firing up to 85 rounds per minute to a range of over 15 km (8 nmi). There are also two 12.7 mm machine guns and two 20 mm Rheinmetall Rh202 cannon for anti-aircraft defence.

The main gun is controlled by an Ultra Electronics Command and Control Systems, Radamec 1500 optronic director with a daylight TV camera, thermal imaging camera and eyesafe laser rangefinder. System 1500 functions in automatic or manual mode. The system provides fire control for surface engagement with spotting corrections in both line and range and has an effective secondary self-defence anti-air capability. System 1500 can detect a small patrol boat at ranges in excess of 12 km (6 1/2 nmi), night or day. The ship's Kelvin Hughes surface search radar, operating at E, F and I bands, is installed high on the main mast over the bridge. The Kelvin Hughes navigation radar operates at I-band.

== Command and control ==
The communications package includes VHF, HF, Inmarsat Global Maritime Distress Safety System (GMDSS) and Differential Global Positioning System (DFPS) and secure communications. Three inflatable boats are deployed from each ship; two 6.5-metre (21 ft 4 in) Delta rigid inflatable boats (RIB) launched with Caley davits, and a single Avon 5.4-metre (17 ft 9 in) RIB.

== Propulsion ==
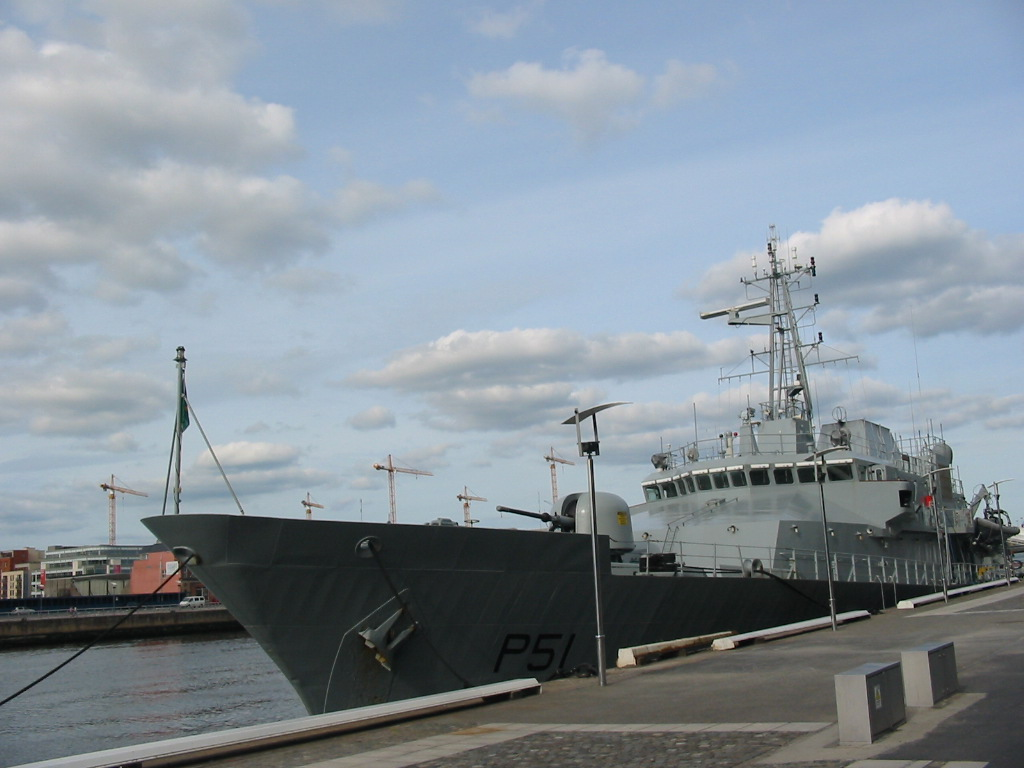
LÉ Róisín moored at Dublin’s docklands, 2008.

The ship is powered by two Wärtsilä 16V26 diesel engines each developing 5,000 kW (6,700 hp) continuous power. The engines drive two shafts with Lips inboard turning controllable pitch propellers via single reduction gearboxes. Each propeller is 2,500 mm in diameter and functions at 300 rpm.

The engines provide a maximum speed of 22 knots (41 km/h) with a range of 6,000 nautical miles (11,000 km) at a cruising speed of 15 knots (28 km/h).

A Brunvoll FU45 CPP bow thrusters, rated at 340 kW with 55 kilonewtons (12,000 lbf) of thrust, is fitted for precision manoeuvring and station keeping. A pair of non-retractable anti-roll fin stabilisers is also fitted.

Three Caterpillar 3412D1-T generators each deliver 405 kW of electric power at 1,500 rpm. One Caterpillar 3406D1-T emergency generator delivers 205 kW at 1,500 rpm.

== Construction and career ==
Róisín was built by Appledore Shipbuilders in Devon, entered service with the Irish Naval Service in September 1999 and is based at the Haulbowline Island, Cork Harbour Headquarters and Dockyard.

On 5 October 2004, Róisín was the first vessel on scene after the fire on board the Canadian Forces submarine Chicoutimi off the northwestern coast of Ireland. As Róisín attempted to assist the submarine, she suffered serious damage from the rough seas and was forced to return to harbour.

Róisín enforced a 200 m (220 yd) exclusion zone around the vessel Astrid which ran aground on 24 July 2013 near Quay Rock at Ballymacus Point, near the Sovereign Islands in southern Ireland, while attempting to enter the harbour near Kinsale, County Cork. Róisín stood by the merchant vessel Abuk Lion in the Irish Sea 30 nmi (56 km) off Kinsale, County Cork on 30 December 2013 when that vessel was in difficulties. Abuk Lion was later taken in tow by Celtic Isle.

Róisín took part in a surveillance operation of the yacht Makayabella in September 2014 before it was boarded 200 nmi (370 km) off Mizen Head and subsequently had €80M worth of cocaine seized.

From May to July 2016 Róisin was deployed to the Mediterranean as part of a humanitarian mission during the European migrant crisis, and was involved in the rescue of several hundred people from unseaworthy vessels.

The midlife refit and upgrade of LÉ Róisín has been completed as of May 2022.

As of January 2023, LÉ Róisin and LÉ Niamh were reportedly tied-up at Haulbowline and would not be "[sent] on patrol due to the crippling staffing retention and recruitment crisis in the Defence Forces".

== See also ==
- LÉ Niamh (P52)
- Protector-class offshore patrol vessel
