= Safehaven Marine =

Boat-building company based in Ireland

- Company type: Private
- Industry: Boat building
- Founded: 1998
- Headquarters: Youghal, County Cork, Ireland
- Key people: Frank Kowalski
- Services: Pilot boats, S.A.R. boats, naval craft, and leisure yachts
- Website: safehavenmarine.com

Safehaven Marine is a boat-building company based in Youghal, County Cork, Ireland. Founded in 1998 by Frank Kowalski, the company designs and builds pilot boats, patrol boats, naval vessels, workboats, and luxury yachts.

== History ==
Safehaven Marine was founded in 1998, initially building commercial workboats, including passenger vessels, fishing boats, and dive boats.

In 2005, the company started to build pilot and patrol boats after winning a tender to design and develop a pilot boat for the Port of Cork.

By 2008, the company expanded its production facilities with a new factory to meet the increased demand. Safehaven Marine has supplied vessels to international clients, including The British Navy, The Polish Navy, P&O Maritime Logistics, Boluda Towage, Maersk and DP World.

Safehaven Marine has delivered vessels to 38 countries and pilot boats to ports worldwide. Major ports operate the company’s pilot boats, including Jebel Ali Tangier Med, Port of Southampton, and multiple others across Europe, Asia, North America, South America, and Africa.

== Products ==
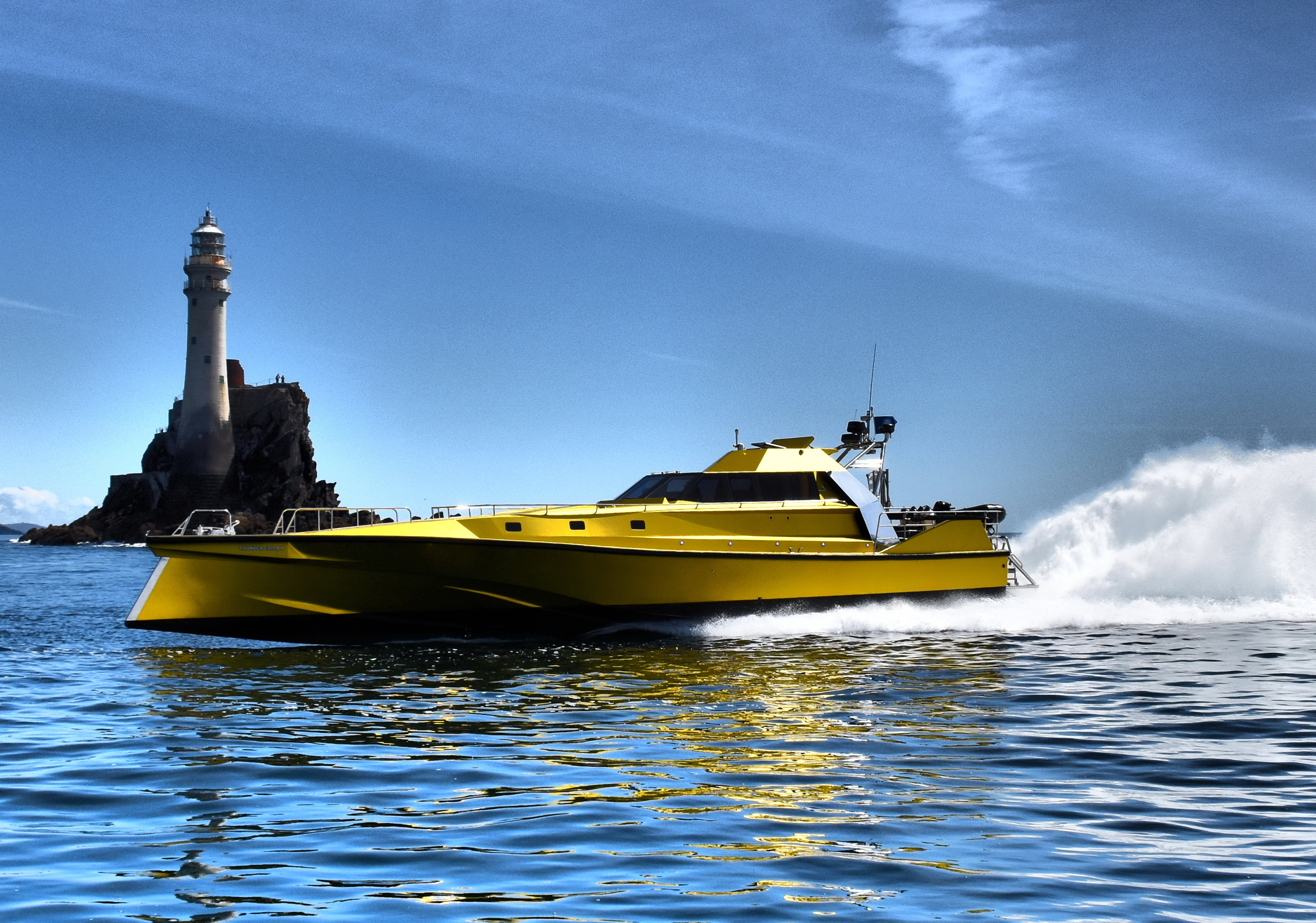
Safehaven Marines XSV20 Thunder Child II

Safehaven Marine builds FRP boats ranging from 11 to 22 meters in length. The company manufactures pilot boats, search & rescue boats (S.A.R.), patrol boats, fast Naval Interceptors, including the unique (patented hull) XSV20, and hydrographic research catamarans. The company recently expanded its range to include luxury private yachts, notably the T-2000 Voyager, launched in 2024.

== Selected achievements and media coverage ==
Safehaven Marine has set multiple UIM (Union International Motonautique) world records for endurance and speed with its vessels, including:

- The XSV17 Thunder Child set the fastest circumnavigation of Ireland and Rockall in 2017.
- The XSV20 completed a 1,000-nautical-mile voyage from Ireland to Iceland. and Cork-Fastnet- Cork UIM record in 2021.

The company was also featured in media and documentaries for testing their boats in extreme conditions, including:

- Storms at Sea (Discovery Channel, 2009).
- Daily Planet documentary series (2015).
- Cork Mega Port series (TV3, 2014).
