= Emer-class offshore patrol vessel =

Class of Irish offshore patrol vessels (OPV)

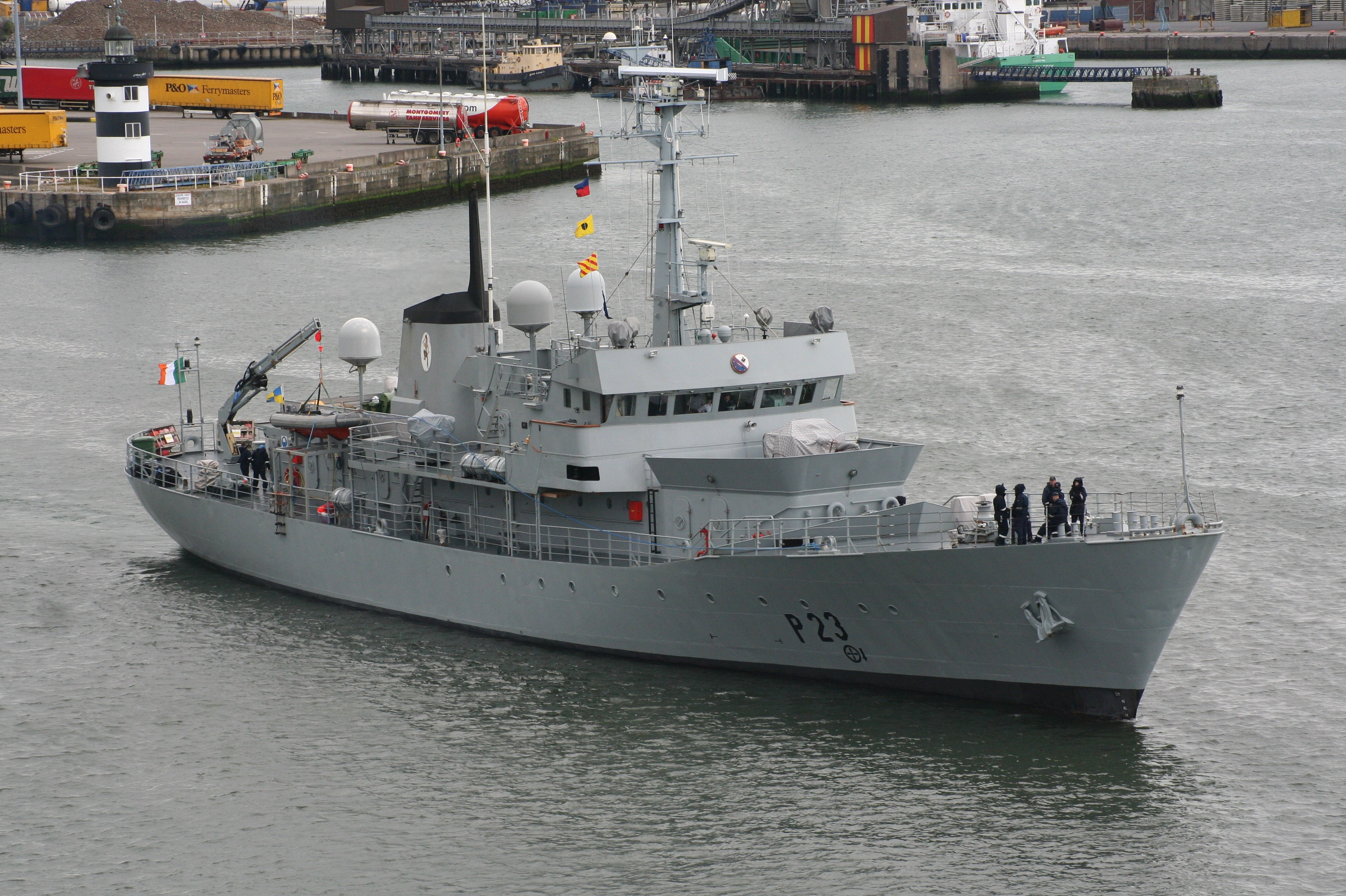
- LÉ Aisling departing Dublin in 2009

Class overview
- Builders: Verolme Dockyard, Cork
- Operators: Initial; Irish Naval Service; Export; Libyan Navy; Maritime Squadron of the Armed Forces of Malta; Nigerian Navy
- Preceded by: LÉ Deirdre
- Succeeded by: Róisín class
- Built: 1977–1980
- In service: 1978–present

General characteristics
- Type: Offshore patrol vessel
- Displacement: 1,019 t (1,003 long tons)
- Length: 65.20 m (213 ft 11 in)
- Beam: 10.50 m (34 ft 5 in)
- Draught: 4.40 m (14 ft 5 in)
- Speed: 31.5 knots (58.3 km/h; 36.2 mph) (maximum)
- Complement: 46 (5 officers and 41 ratings)
- Armament: 1 × Bofors 40/L70 gun; 2 × Rheinemetall RH202 20 mm cannons; MAG58 7.62 mm machine guns

The Emer-class offshore patrol vessel was a class of three offshore patrol vessels (OPV) operated by the Irish Naval Service from January 1978 until June 2016. After decommissioning from the Irish Naval Service, the ships were acquired and put into service by a number of foreign navies.

== Design and construction ==
After evaluating Deirdre for three years, the Irish Naval Service ordered the lead ship of an evolved design in 1975. The keel laying for Emer took place on 28 February 1977. The launch followed later that year on 26 September 1977. The keel for the second ship, Aoife, was laid on 3 July 1978 and she was launched 12 April 1979. The final ship, Aisling, had her keel laid on 31 January 1979 and was launched 3 October 1979.

== Ships in class ==
Hull number	Name	Builder	Commissioned	Decommissioned	Fate	Notes
P21	Emer	Verolme Dockyard, Cork	16 January 1978	20 September 2013	Acquired by the Nigerian Navy in 2015	Renamed NNS Prosperity
P22	Aoife	Verolme Dockyard, Cork	29 November 1979	31 January 2015	Donated to the Maltese Navy in 2015	Renamed P62
P23	Aisling	Verolme Dockyard, Cork	21 May 1980	22 June 2016	Acquired by the Libyan National Army's Navy in 2018	Renamed Al Karama

== Export ==
=== Nigeria ===
Emer was decommissioned on 20 September 2013, and was sold at auction for €320,000 to a Nigerian businessman in October 2013.

In July 2014, Emer was impounded by the Nigerian Navy because the new owner had failed to secure the necessary military approval before bringing the ship into Nigerian waters. On 19 February 2015, the vessel was commissioned into the Nigerian Navy as a training ship and renamed NNS Prosperity.

=== Malta ===
Aoife was decommissioned on 31 January 2015 and was donated to the Maltese Naval Service. She was commissioned later that year on 26 June as P62.

=== Libya ===
Aisling was put up for a public auction on 23 March 2017 at the Carrigaline Hotel in County Cork, and was purchased by a Dutch broker for his clients for a reported price of €110,000, there being no other higher bids. As of 10 May 2017, the vessel was listed on a brokerage website with an asking price of $750,000 (€685,000), with the difference between sale price and asking price attracting attention from representative groups.

In 2018, Aisling was commissioned, under the name Al Karama (Arabic: الكرامة, romanized: al-karāma, lit. 'dignity'), as the flagship of the naval component of the Libyan National Army.
