= LÉ Niamh =

2001 Róisín-class offshore patrol vessel

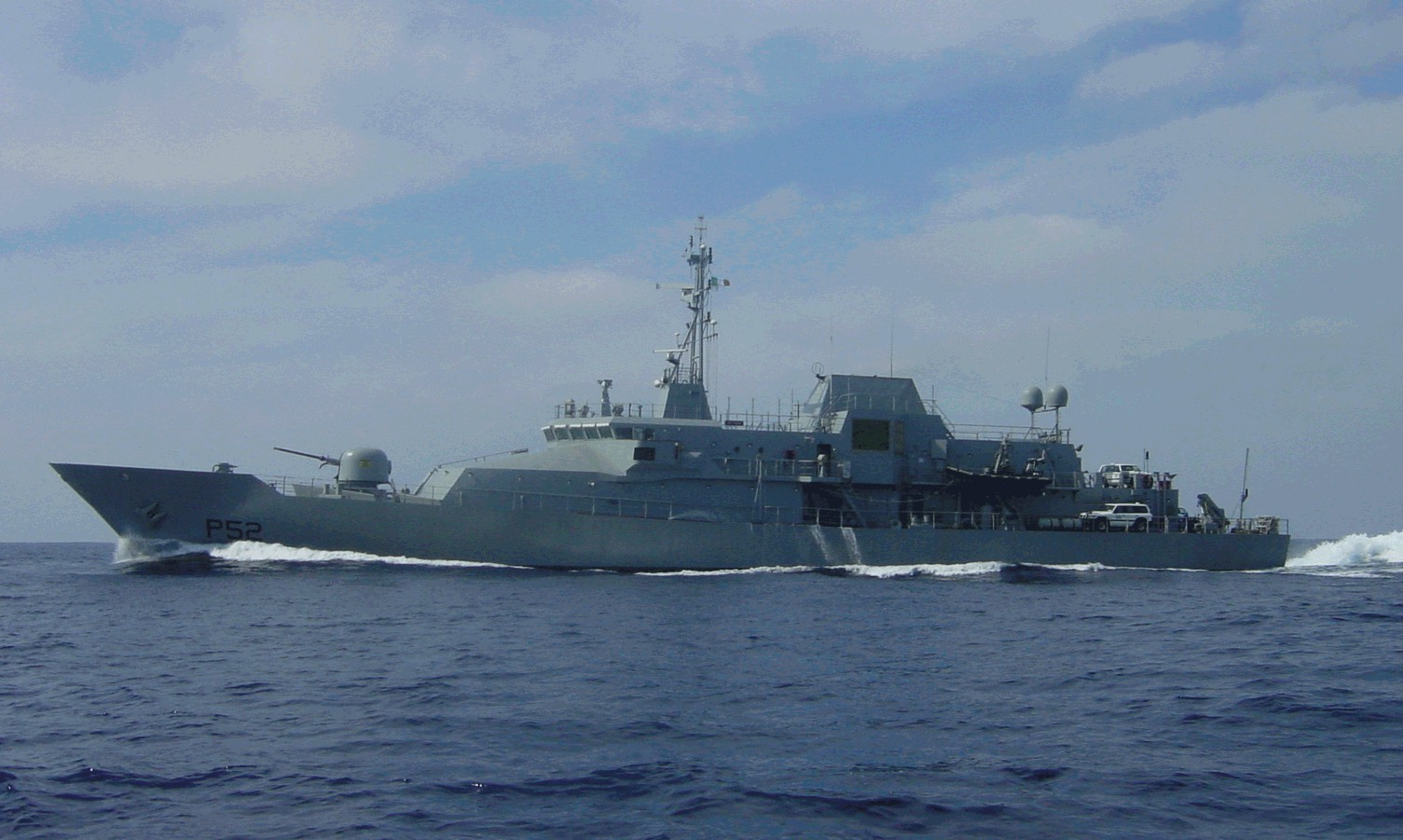
- Niamh sailing in August 2013

History

Ireland
- Name: LÉ Niamh
- Namesake: Niamh, an Irish mythological character
- Builder: Appledore Shipbuilders, North Devon
- Commissioned: 18 September 2001
- Home port: Haulbowline Naval Base
- Identification: IMO number: 9231456; MMSI number: 250480000; Callsign: EIYN; Pennant number: P52
- Status: Under repair and "mid-life upgrade" as of February 2023

General characteristics
- Class & type: Róisín-class offshore patrol vessel
- Displacement: 1,500 tonnes standard
- Length: 78.84 m (258.7 ft) overall
- Beam: 14 m (46 ft)
- Draught: 3.8 m (12 ft)
- Speed: 42.6 km/h (23.0 kn) maximum
- Boats & landing craft carried: 2 Delta 6.5 m (21 ft) RHIBs; 1 Avon 5.4 m (18 ft) RHIB
- Complement: 44 (6 officers and 38 ratings)
- Armament: 1 × 76 mm OTO Melara Cannon; 2 × 20 mm Rheinmetall Rh202 Canon; 2 × 12.7 mm HMG; 4 × 7.62 mm GPMG

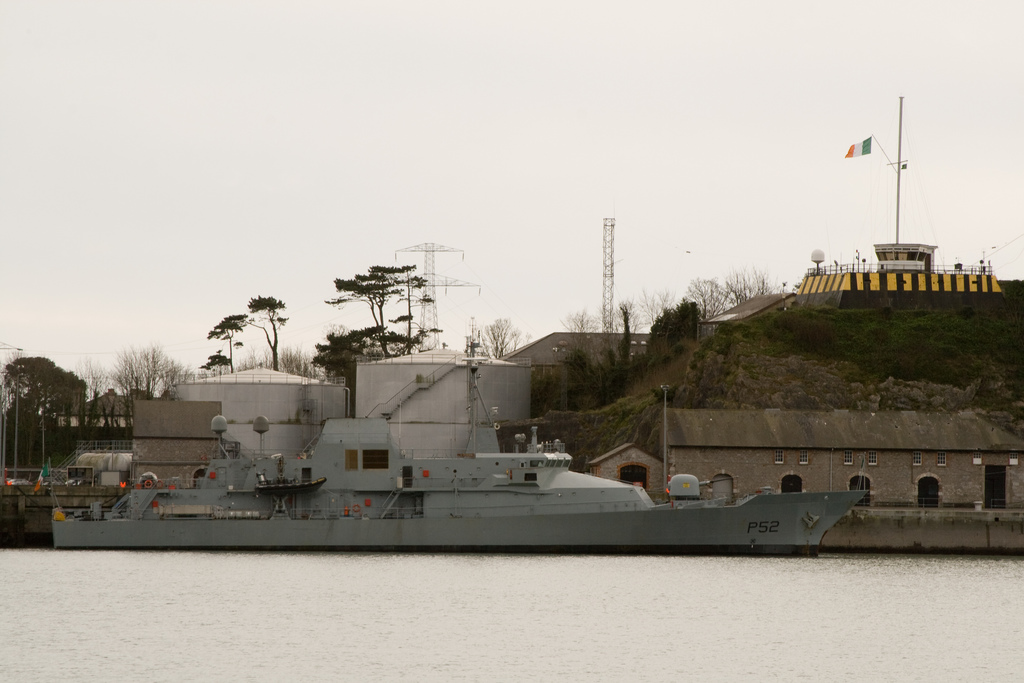
Niamh at Haulbowline in February 2008

LÉ Niamh (P52) is a Róisín-class offshore patrol vessel in the Irish Naval Service. The ship is named after Niamh, queen of Tír na nÓg, from Irish mythology. Commissioned in 2001, as of 2020 the ship was in active service.

== Design ==
The ship was designed by STX Canada Marine (formerly Kvaerner Masa Marine) and has an all-steel hull based on the Mauritian patrol vessel Vigilant launched in 1995, but without the helicopter deck and hangar facilities. The level of automation incorporated into the ship's systems allows the ship to be operated with just 44 crew including six officers. The vessel is designed for winter North Atlantic operations.

== Weapons systems ==
The ship is armed with an OTO Melara 76 mm dual-purpose gun installed on the bow gun deck. The gun fires 12-kilogram (26 lb) shells and is capable of firing up to 85 rounds per minute to a range of over 15 kilometres (9.3 mi). It also has two 12.7 mm (.50 inch) machine guns and two 20 mm Rheinmetall Rh202 Canon for anti-aircraft defence.

The main gun is controlled by an Ultra Electronics Command and Control Systems, Radamec 1500 optronic director with a daylight TV camera, thermal imaging camera and eyesafe laser rangefinder. System 1500 functions in automatic or manual mode. The system provides fire control for surface engagement with spotting corrections in both line and range and has an effective secondary self-defence anti-air capability. System 1500 can detect a small patrol boat at ranges in excess of 12 kilometres (7.5 mi), night or day. The ship's Kelvin Hughes surface search radar, operating at E, F and I bands, is installed high on the main mast over the bridge. The Kelvin Hughes navigation radar operates at I-band.

== Command and control ==
The communications package includes VHF, HF, Inmarsat Global Maritime Distress Safety System (GMDSS) and Differential Global Positioning System (DFPS) and secure communications. Three inflatable boats are deployed from each ship; two 6.5-metre (21 ft) Delta rigid inflatable boats (RIB) launched with Caley davits, and a single Avon 5.4-metre (18 ft) RIB.

== Propulsion ==
The ship is powered by two Wärtsilä 16V26 diesel engines each developing 5,000 kW (6,700 hp) continuous power. The engines drive two shafts with Lips inboard turning controllable pitch propellers via single reduction gearboxes. Each propeller is 2,500 mm in diameter and functions at 300 rpm.

The engines provide a maximum speed of 22 knots (41 km/h; 25 mph) with a range of 6,000 nautical miles (11,000 km; 6,900 mi) at a cruising speed of 15 knots (28 km/h; 17 mph).

A Brunvoll FU45 CPP bow thruster, rated at 340 kW with 5.6 t (55 kN) thrust, is fitted for precision manoeuvring and station keeping. The vessel is also equipped with a pair of non-retractable anti-roll fin stabilisers.

Three Caterpillar 3412D1-T generators each deliver 405 kWe at 1,500 rpm. One Caterpillar 3406D1-T emergency generator delivers 205 kWe at 1,500 rpm.

== Construction and career ==
The second of the Róisín or P50 class of offshore patrol boats, Niamh was built by Appledore Shipbuilders in Devon, entered service with the Irish Naval Service in July 2001, and is based at the Haulbowline Island, Cork Harbour Headquarters and Dockyard. Niamh's adopted home port is Limerick City.

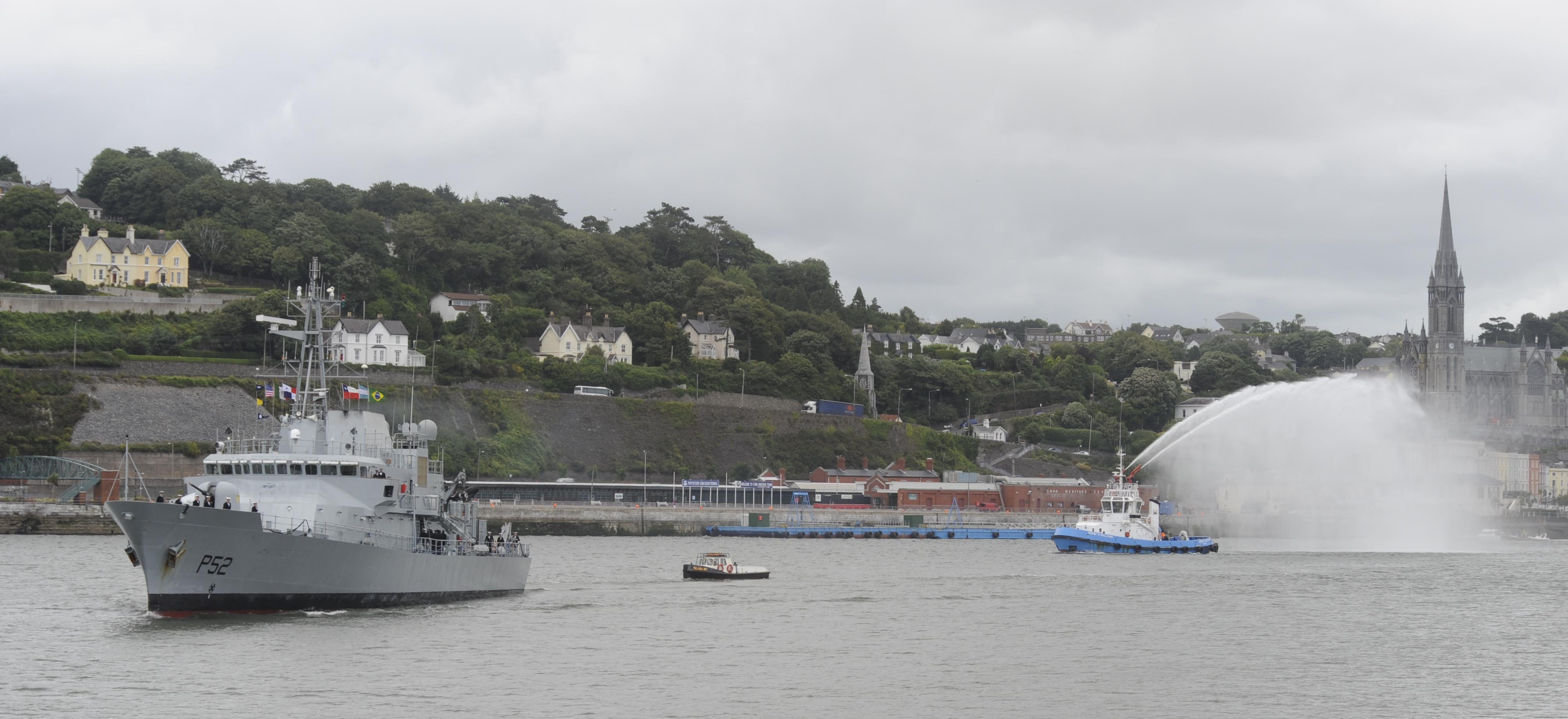
Niamh returns to Haulbowline following her 2010 South American tour

In February 2002, 5 months after she was commissioned, Niamh departed from Haulbowline on the most ambitious deployment ever undertaken by an Irish Naval Service vessel; initially tasked with resupplying Irish Army troops deployed as part of the United Nations Mission in Ethiopia and Eritrea, she subsequently undertook a cruise to a number of nations in Asia as part of the Irish government's overseas trade promotion strategy visiting Hong Kong, Incheon, Shanghai, Tokyo and Penang over a four-month period. During the cruise, Niamh became the first Irish warship to both transit the Suez Canal and cross the Equator.

Niamh was involved in the rescue of the Canadian Forces submarine Chicoutimi off the northwestern coast of Ireland on 5 October 2004.

In November 2008 Niamh played an important role in the seizure of €750 million of cocaine off the Irish coast as part of Operation Seabight. The ship was used by authorities to approach and board the yacht Dances with Waves, which contained 75 bales of the controlled substance.

Niamh took part in a surveillance operation of the yacht Makayabella in September 2014 before it was boarded 200 miles (320 km) off Mizen Head and subsequently had €80m worth of cocaine seized.

From July–September 2015, Niamh took part in a humanitarian operation in the Mediterranean: rescuing migrants from unseaworthy vessels. This included a significant incident when Niamh was first to respond to the capsizing of a boat carrying hundreds of migrants off the coast of Libya. 367 migrants were rescued by the crew of Niamh and brought to Palermo — though several hundred were feared drowned. Niamh returned to Ireland in October 2015, before undertaking additional missions under Operation Sophia in subsequent years.

As of mid-2021, the vessel had reportedly commenced a midlife refit, which was projected to take between 12 and 18 months. In January 2023, LÉ Niamh and LÉ Róisin had reportedly been tied-up at Haulbowline and would not be "[sent] on patrol due to the crippling staffing retention and recruitment crisis in the Defence Forces".

== See also ==
- LÉ Róisín (P51)
- Protector-class offshore patrol vessel RNZN
