= Róisín-class patrol vessel =

Irish navy ship class

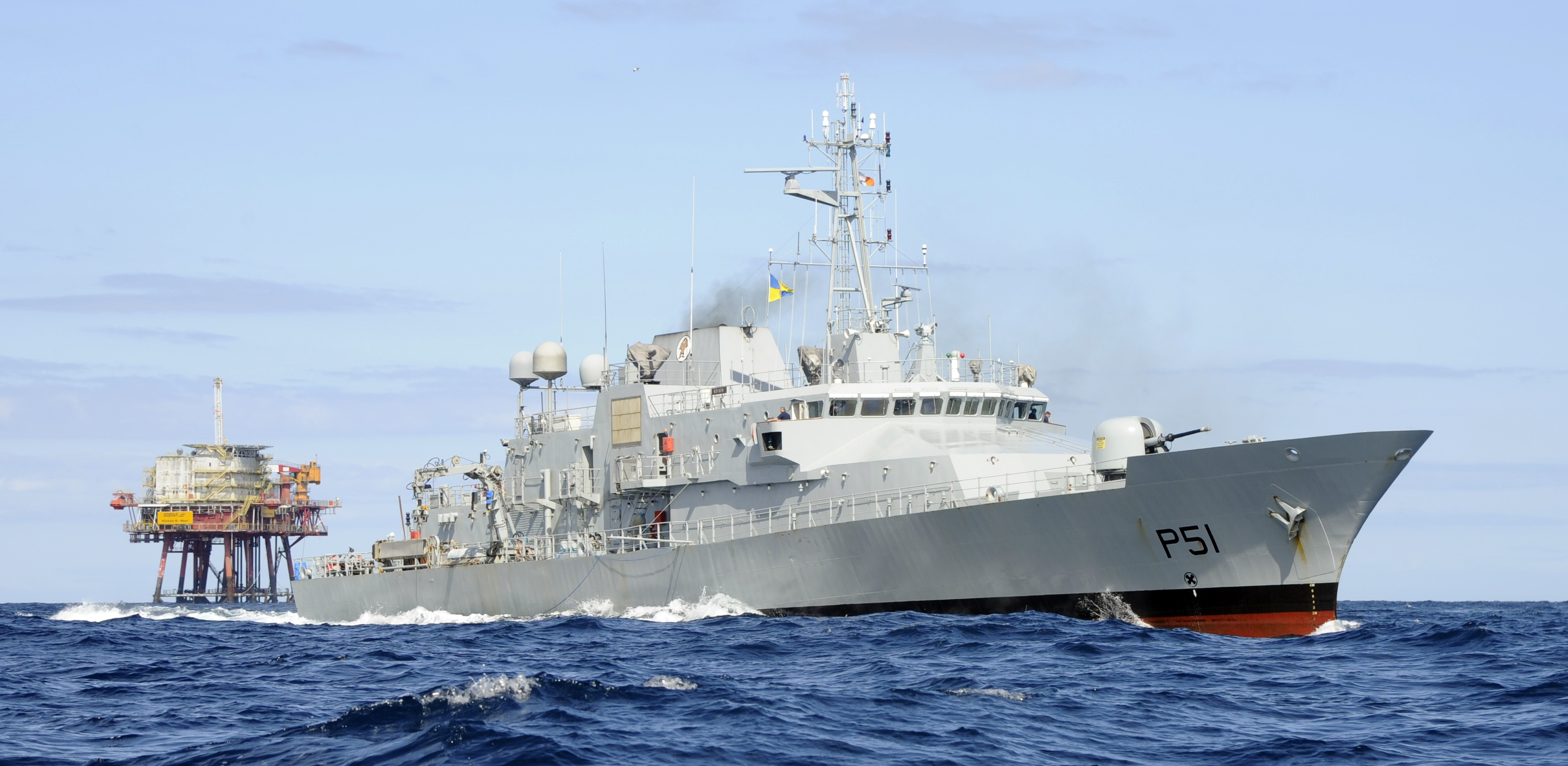
- LÉ Róisín on patrol

Class overview
- Name: Róisín class
- Builders: Appledore Shipbuilders, North Devon
- Operators: (Republic of Ireland) Irish Naval Service
- Preceded by: Emer class; Peacock class
- Succeeded by: Samuel Beckett class
- In commission: 1999–present
- Planned: 2
- Completed: 2
- Active: 0
- Laid up: 2 (as of February 2023)

General characteristics
- Type: Offshore patrol vessel
- Displacement: 1,500 t (1,500 long tons)
- Length: 78.84 m (258 ft 8 in)
- Beam: 14 m (45 ft 11 in)
- Draught: 3.8 m (12 ft 6 in)
- Installed power: 2 × 5,000 kW (6,700 hp)
- Propulsion: 2 × Wärtsilä medium speed diesels
- Speed: 23 knots (43 km/h; 26 mph) (maximum)
- Range: 6,000 nmi (11,000 km; 6,900 mi) at 15 knots (28 km/h; 17 mph)
- Boats & landing craft carried: 2 × Delta 6.5 m (21 ft) RHIB; 1 × Avon 5.4 m (18 ft) RHIB
- Complement: 44 (6 officers and 38 ratings)
- Sensors & processing systems: Kelvin Hughes radar
- Armament: 1 × 76 mm OTO Melara gun; 2 × 20 mm Rheinmetall cannon; 2 × 12.7 mm HMG; 4 × 7.62 mm GPMG

The Róisín-class large patrol vessel is a class of offshore patrol vessels (OPV) ordered by the Irish Naval Service from December 1997. The first vessel is named Róisín, which is also the name given to the class. Construction on this first vessel commenced in December 1997, and it was commissioned in December 1999. The second vessel was named Niamh and delivered in 2001.

The class's primary mission is fisheries protection, search and rescue, and maritime protection operations, including vessel boardings.

== Design ==
The class was designed by Vard Marine (formerly STX Canada Marine) and has an all-steel hull based on the Mauritian patrol vessel Vigilant launched in 1995, but without the helicopter deck and hangar facilities. The level of automation incorporated into the ships' systems allows the ships in the class to be operated with just 44 crew including 6 officers. The class is designed for winter North Atlantic operations.

== Names ==
| Name | Pennant number | Builder | Laid down | Commissioned | Status |
|---|---|---|---|---|---|
| Róisín | P51 | Appledore Shipbuilders, North Devon | December 1997 | 15 December 1999 | "Operational reserve" (as of January 2023) |
| Niamh | P52 | Appledore Shipbuilders, North Devon | April 2000 | 18 September 2001 | "Operational reserve" (as of January 2023) |
