= LÉ Deirdre =

Irish Naval Service ship

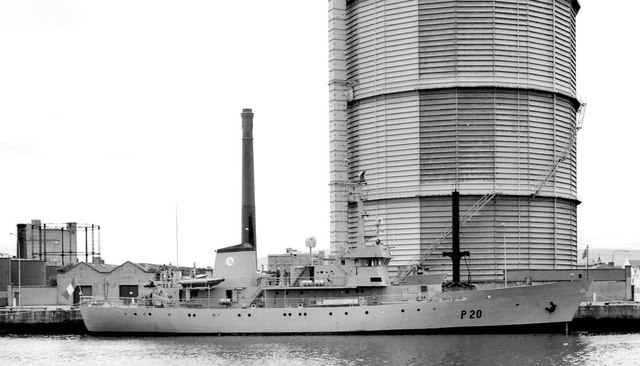

History

Ireland
- Name: Deirdre
- Namesake: Deirdre
- Builder: Verolme Cork Dockyard, Cork
- Yard number: 819
- Laid down: 10 August 1971
- Launched: 21 January 1972
- Commissioned: 19 June 1972
- Decommissioned: 2001
- Stricken: 2003
- Home port: Cork
- Identification: IMO number: 8639857; MMSI number: 538070595; Callsign: V7QY3; Pennant number: P20
- Fate: Scrapped 2014

General characteristics
- Type: Offshore patrol vessel
- Displacement: 972 tonnes max
- Length: 56.1 m (184 ft) overall
- Beam: 10.42 m (34.2 ft)
- Draught: 4.38 m (14.4 ft)
- Speed: 33.3 km/h (18.0 kn) maximum
- Boats & landing craft carried: 3
- Complement: 47 (6 officers and 41 ratings )
- Armament: 1 × 40 mm/60 Bofors; 2 × 12.7 mm machine guns

LÉ Deirdre (P20) was a ship in the Irish Naval Service. She was named after Deirdre, a tragic heroine from Irish mythology who committed suicide after her lover's murder.

Built in 1972, Deirdre was built as an addition to the Ton-class minesweepers, and was the first vessel designed and built for the Irish Naval Service in Ireland. She was to have longer range and be a more seaworthy ship for work in the Atlantic. Deirdre became the prototype for the later Emer-type vessels.

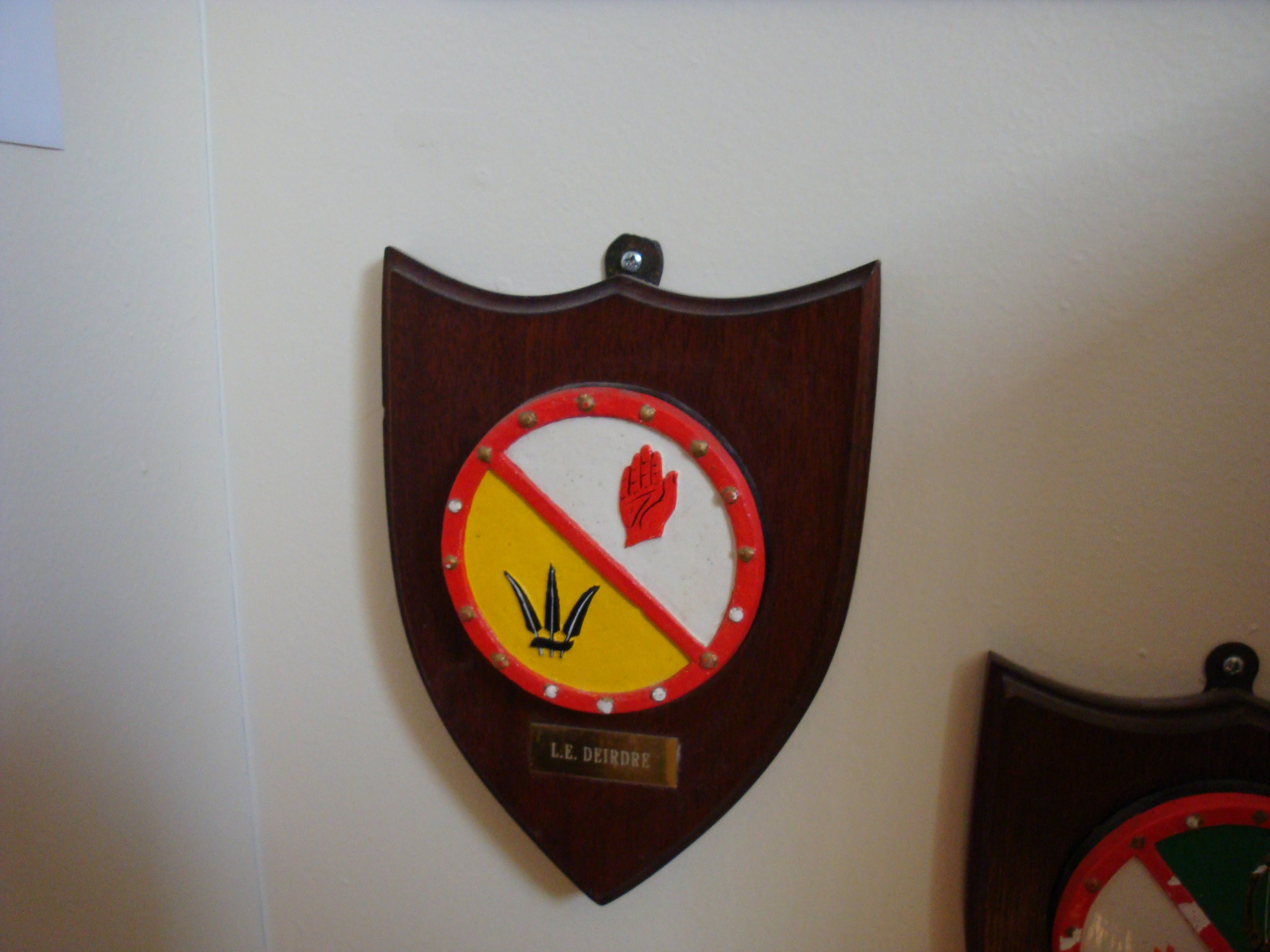
LÉ Deirdre badge, National Maritime Museum

Deirdre undertook a number of search and rescue operations throughout her careers. For example, Deirdre was one of the vessels involved in the 1979 Fastnet race rescue operations, assisting the crews of two yachts. In 1990, during the rescue of a Spanish trawler crew in Bantry Bay, a member of Deirdre's crew died – and was posthumously awarded the Distinguished Service Medal and Spanish Cross of Naval Merit.

By the time of the vessel's naval decommissioning in early 2001, Deirdre had travelled approximately 450,000 nautical miles. She was replaced by a Róisín-class patrol vessel.

Deirdre was sold at public auction for IR£190,000 in 2001. She was purchased by the English yacht chartering company Seastream International for conversion into luxury charter yacht Tosca IV for the company's owner, businessman Christopher Matthews. Speaking on the radio, a Seastream spokesman appeared pleased with their bargain as they had been prepared to bid up to IR£500,000. The auction starting price had been IR£60,000.

The conversion in a Polish shipyard was not completed as the English owner died. In 2007 she was towed to Brazil for further refit and completion. Substantially complete, she arrived at Jacksonville, Florida in September 2012 for final outfitting as Santa Rita I. However, in August 2014, Santa Rita I was towed to Green Cove Springs, Florida, for breaking.
