= 4th Brigade (Ireland) =

Former Brigade of the Irish Army

- Irish: 4ú Briogáid
- 4th Brigade shoulder flash
- Disbanded: 2012
- Country: Ireland
- Branch: Army
- Part of: Defence Forces
- Garrison/HQ: Custume Barracks, Athlone

Commanders
- Notable commanders: Brigadier General Gerald Aherne (last commander)

The 4th Brigade (4 BDE), also known as 4th (Western) Brigade was a Brigade of the Irish Army headquartered in Custume Barracks in Athlone. It was disbanded in 2012 during a reorganisation of the Irish Defence Forces.

== History ==
150 or so soldiers drawn from the Brigade were deployed as a part of the 32nd Infantry Battalion as the first full contingent of Irish peacekeepers to see oversea service when they were sent to the Congo as part of ONUC in 1960.

Soldiers from the Brigade also served in UN Peacekeeping Missions in Lebanon, Kosovo, Liberia and Chad.

On 30 November 2012, as a result of a significant reorganisation of the Irish Defence Forces, 4th Brigade was stood down at its headquarters in Custume Barracks in Athlone. The 1st Infantry Battalion was transferred to 1st Brigade, while the 6th and 28th Infantry Battalions were transferred to 2nd Brigade.

== Organisation ==
=== 1979-2000 ===
- Brigade HQ (Custume Barracks, Athlone)
- 1st Infantry Battalion (Galway)
- 6th Infantry Battalion (Athlone)
- 28th Infantry Battalion (Finner Camp, Lifford, Letterkenny)
- 4th Cavalry Squadron (Longford)
- 4th Field Artillery Regiment (Mullingar)
- 4th Field Engineers Company (Athlone)
- 4th Field Signals Company (Athlone)
- 4th Field Supply and Transport Company (Athlone)
- 4th Field Medical Company (Athlone)
- 4th Field Military Police Company (Athlone)

== Future ==
Since the disbanding of 4th Brigade in 2012 there has been a significant movement, especially prevalent in the counties of Roscommon and Westmeath, supporting the re-establishment of the Brigade, along with the return of its former units. Many politicians have voiced support for reinstating the Brigade, most notably Fianna Fáil, which sees it as a boost for the Midlands, Athlone in particular. Other politicians, such as independent Sligo–Leitrim TD Marian Harkin have also shown support for the return of the Brigade.
