= J. Stone & Co =

British marine and railway engineering company

J. Stone & Co was a British marine and railway engineering company based in Deptford (and later Charlton) in south east London, particularly noted for the manufacture of nails and rivets, Stone-Lloyd watertight ships' doors, brass ships' propellers, iron manhole covers, pumps, and railway carriage electric lighting and air conditioning systems. Stone Foundries and Stone Fasteners continue to operate in Charlton.

== History ==
Josiah Stone established an engineering workshop in 1831, producing cast copper nails for the shipbuilding industry in nearby Greenwich. In 1842, with George Preston and John Prestige, he co-founded J. Stone & Co and relocated to premises in railway arches where he made hand pumps and manual firefighting engines. With the company's product range expanded to include rivets and other engineering items, the firm established a foundry in Deptford's Arklow Road in 1881, becoming a specialist in casting large copper propellers.

The company's non-ferrous foundry moved to Charlton in 1917, and became J. Stone and Co (Charlton) Ltd in 1951. It produced 22,000 propellers for the Royal Navy during World War II (its products being fitted to battleships, aircraft carriers, cruisers and numerous smaller vessels), plus propellers and water-tight doors for RMS Queen Mary, RMS Queen Elizabeth and Royal Yacht Britannia. In 1963 Stone's marine propeller business merged with Manganese Bronze (originally founded by Perceval M. Parsons in Deptford in 1876, incorporated as the Manganese Bronze and Brass Co in 1882, before relocating to Millwall and then Birkenhead in 1941) and manufacture moved to Birkenhead.

Stone Foundries still operates at Charlton in a plant established in 1939 to produce aluminium and magnesium light alloy castings mainly for the aircraft industry, having produced specialised alloy parts and aircraft propellers for the Vickers Viscount and de Havilland Comet. In 1982, Stone Foundries was acquired by Langham Industries.

In 1950 the Deptford works made rail and road transport products, nails, rivets and washers. In 1959 the firm became Stone Platt Industries. The Deptford factory closed in 1969, but production of nails and rivets continues at Langham Industries' Charlton-based Stone Fasteners.

== Sporting legacy ==
Workers from Stone's Deptford Arklow Road foundry established a rowing club in 1923. Membership of the Stones Rowing Club was restricted to company employees, but after the company refused a grant to purchase new equipment, the club broke away from the works and set up independently, with headquarters in the nearby Lord Clyde public house (western end of Clyde Street). The club was then known as the Clyde Rowing Club before moving in the mid 1930s to another public house, The Globe on Royal Hill in Greenwich (demolished c. 1938), from which the club took its current name, Globe Rowing Club.
