= Appledore Shipbuilders =

Shipbuilder company in England

- Type: Private limited company
- Industry: Shipbuilding; Ship repair; Civil Engineering; Marine Engineering; Offshore construction
- Founded: 1855; 171 years ago
- Headquarters: Appledore, Devon, England
- Parent: NavantiaUk

Appledore Shipbuilders is a shipbuilder in Appledore, North Devon, England.

== History ==
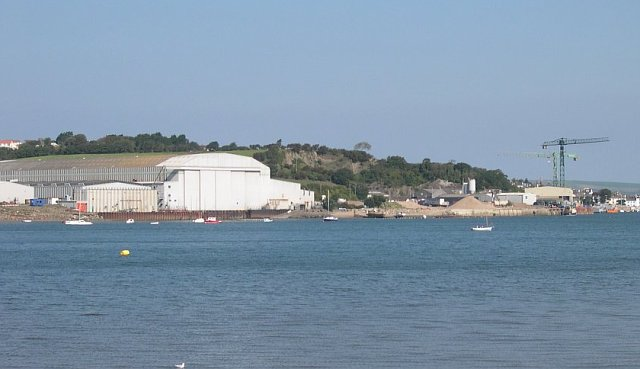
Appledore shipyard

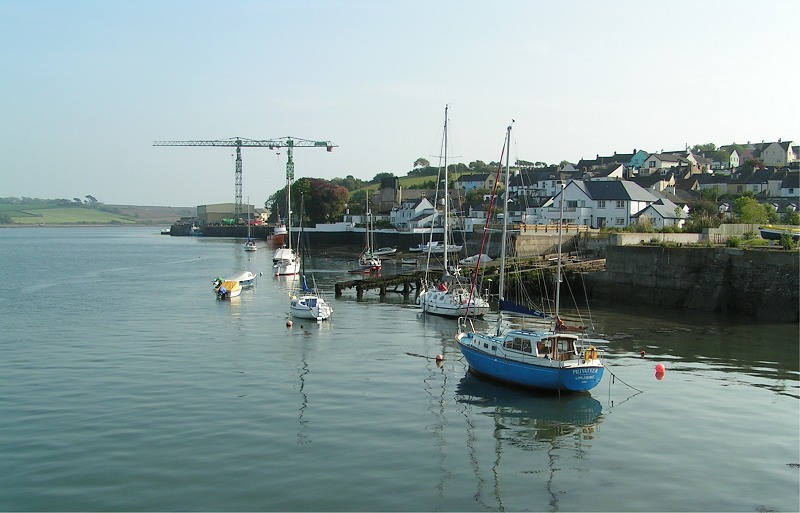
The shipyard's cranes

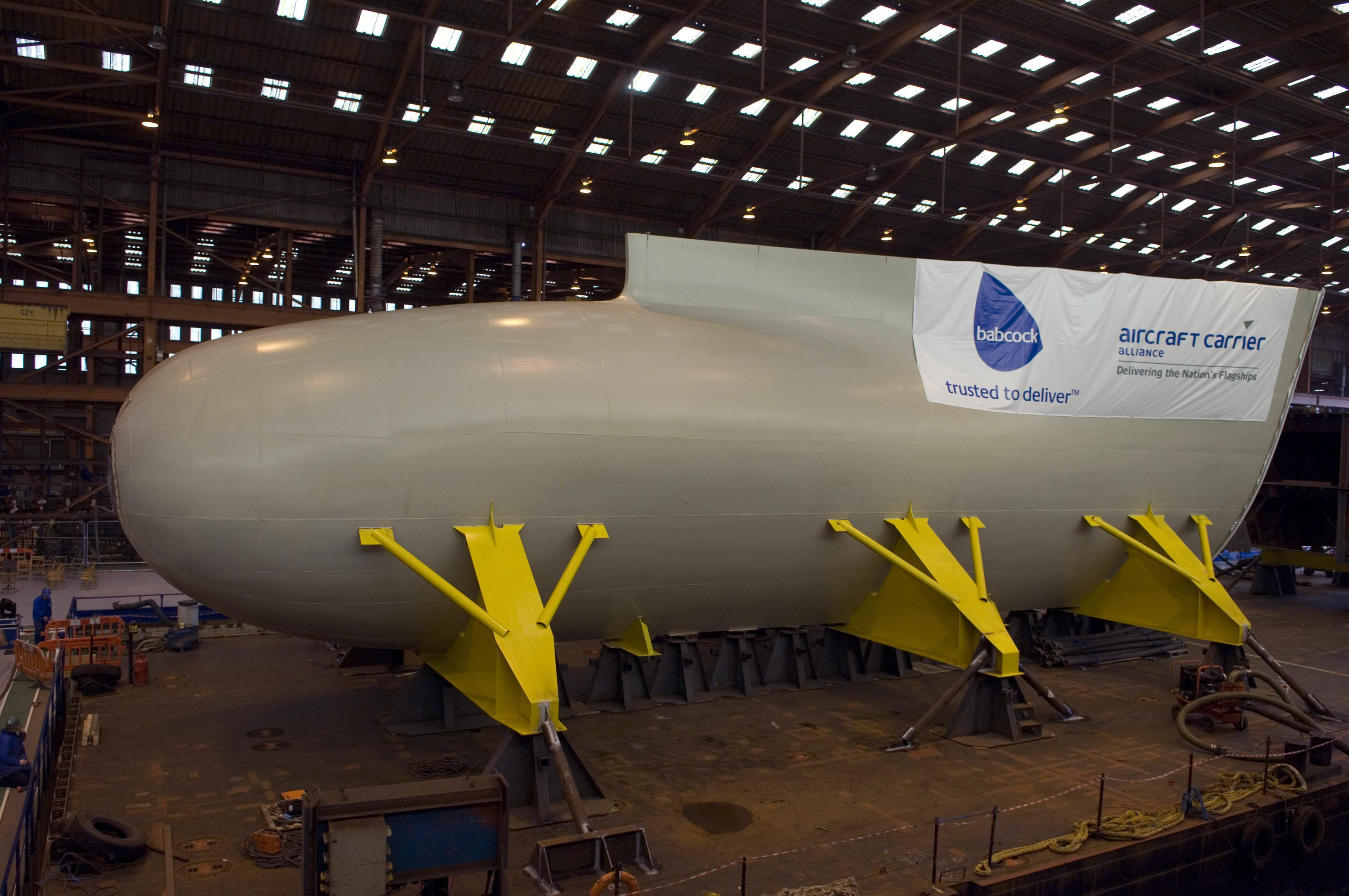
Bow section of HMS Queen Elizabeth at Appledore in March 2010

The Appledore Yard was founded in 1855 on the estuary of the River Torridge. The Richmond Dry Dock was built in 1856 by William Yeo and named after Richmond Bay on the north coast of Prince Edward Island in Canada, where the Yeo family's shipping fleet was based.

The business was led by Philip Kelly Harris during the early part of the 20th century and known as P.K. Harris & Sons until 1963, when it became Appledore Shipbuilders.

During World War II, P.K. Harris & Sons built a variety of small vessels for the Royal Navy, primarily coastal craft. These included Fairmile B motor launches ML 128, ML 152, ML 184, ML 233, ML 263, ML 279, ML 304 and ML 451; Fairmile D motor gun boats (later re-classed as motor torpedo boats) MGB 618, MGB 627, MGB 642, MTB 665, MTB 687, MTB 702, MTB 723, MTB 757, MTB 788 and MTB 5021; and (armed) motor fishing vessels MFV 794 and MFV 795.

In 1964 the company was acquired by Court Line, a shipping and airline business. A new shipyard was built on a greenfield site in Appledore at a cost of about £4m, opening for business in 1970. Court Line collapsed in 1974 and Appledore Shipbuilders was nationalised, subsequently being subsumed into British Shipbuilders. By the late 1980s the only yards still held in state ownership were the smaller Appledore and Ferguson yards. In 1989, Appledore Shipbuilders was sold to Langham Industries.

In the late 1990s the two square-rigged sail training ships of the Tall Ships Youth Trust, the Prince William and the Stavros S Niarchos, were completed at Appledore, by performing substantial modifications to two bare hulls begun in Germany.

Appledore built two Róisín-class patrol boats for the Irish Naval Service: LÉ Róisín was completed in 1999 and LÉ Niamh in 2001. In 2010, Ireland ordered a further two, 90-metre (295 ft 3 in), 23-knot (43 km/h; 26 mph) offshore patrol vessels from Babcock with an option for a third, to be built at Appledore. The first Samuel Beckett-class offshore patrol vessels was commissioned in May 2014. In June 2014, the Irish government took up the option for the third ship to be built at Appledore (delivered in 2016) and ordered a fourth in 2016 (delivered in 2018).

In October 2003, the Appledore shipyard went into receivership, and in early 2004 was acquired by DML, the operators of Devonport dockyard. The company was reconstituted as Appledore Shipbuilders (2004) Limited and was run by the DML subsidiary DML Appledore. During this period the yard's main activity was the installation of machinery packages and other systems for luxury yachts for Devonport Yachts Ltd.

In June 2007, Babcock International Group acquired DML, including its operations at the Appledore Shipyard, renaming them Babcock Marine Appledore. A Royal Navy contract secured 300 jobs in Appledore until 2015. The Appledore yard constructed elements of the two Queen Elizabeth-class aircraft carriers. Bow sections for HMS Queen Elizabeth were completed in April 2010 and were barged to Rosyth Dockyard for integration with other modules. The yard then built flight deck sponsons and centre blocks for Queen Elizabeth. From 2012, Appledore built similar sections for Queen Elizabeth's sister ship HMS Prince of Wales.

Babcock announced in November 2018 that it had no future for the shipyard, which closed on 15 March 2019. The last vessel to be built at the yard was the LÉ George Bernard Shaw, an Irish Naval Service vessel.

In August 2020, InfraStrata (owners of Belfast shipyard Harland and Wolff) bought the dormant shipyard for £7 million. The deal saw the shipyard renamed H&W Appledore.

In July 2022, the shipyard won a £55 million contract to refit former Royal Navy mine-hunting ship HMS Quorn (M41) which was expected to be passed to the Lithuanian navy in 2024. The contract became a casualty of the 2024 collapse of Harland & Wolff and in August 2025 the ship, under her new name Sūduvis (M55), was towed to Klaipėda for completion of the conversion.

The yard, along with the rest of Harland and Wolff's assets, was acquired by Navantia UK in 2025.

== Ships built at Appledore ==
The company built more than 350 vessels, including small and medium-sized military craft, bulk carriers, LPG carriers, superyachts, ferries, and oil-industry support vessels. Specific ships include:

Survey vessels: HMS Echo; HMS Enterprise; HMS Scott; Tall ships: Stavros S Niarchos; Prince William; Superyachts: MY Samar; MY Sarafsa; MY Vava II; Ferries: MV Clansman; MV Coruisk; MV Hoy Head; Scillonian III; Shannon Dolphin; Shannon Breeze; Aircraft carriers: HMS Queen Elizabeth, bulbous bow and sections; HMS Prince of Wales, bulbous bow and sections	Patrol vessels: LÉ Róisín; LÉ Niamh; LÉ Samuel Beckett; LÉ James Joyce; LÉ William Butler Yeats; LÉ George Bernard Shaw; Research ships: RRS Charles Darwin; Commercial vessels: Manchester Vigour, a container ship; Manchester Zeal, a container ship; Seamark, a pilot cutter for Swansea Bay; Wimpey Seadog, supply vessel; Craigdarragh, a tug boat; Alphagas, an LPG carrier; Betagas, an LPG carrier; Deltagas, an LPG carrier; Arklow Bridge, a bulk carrier; Star Hercules; Suffolk Chieftain, a fishing vessel; Toisa Coral, an offshore supply vessel; Toisa Crest, an offshore supply vessel; Toisa Conqueror, an offshore supply vessel; Ikar, a tug boat; Elkhound, a tug boat; Efgee, tosher tug boat; Dredgers: City of Chichester; City of Cardiff; City of Westminster; City of London; Cherry Sand; Arco Avon; Arco Arun; Arco Axe; Arco Adur; Arco Trent; Britannia Beaver; UKD Marlin
