= 1st Brigade (Ireland) =

Unit of the Irish Army

- Irish: 1ú Briogáid
- 1st Brigade shoulder flash
- Country: Ireland
- Branch: Army
- Part of: Defence Forces
- Garrison/HQ: Collins Barracks, Cork
- Website: military.ie/en/who-we-are/army/1-brigade

Commanders
- General Officer Commanding: Brigadier General Caimin Keogh

Insignia
- Flag

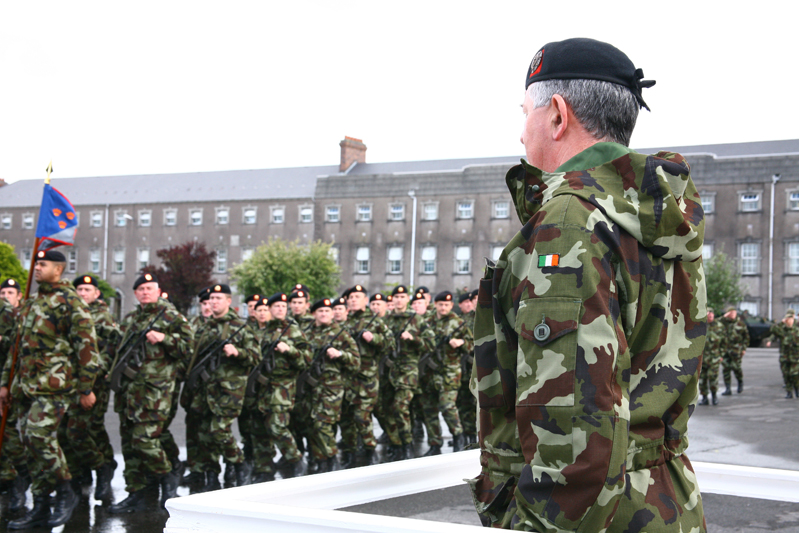
Soldiers parade at Collins Barracks, Cork, HQ of the Army's 1st Brigade

The 1st Brigade (1 BDE) (Irish: 1ú Briogáid) is a brigade of the Irish Army. The brigade, which was known as 1st (Southern) Brigade until the 2012 reorganisation of the army, has its headquarters in Collins Barracks in Cork. The 1st Brigade is responsible for military operations in the south of Ireland. Its area of responsibility includes the counties of Galway, Offaly, Laois, Carlow, Kilkenny, Wexford, Waterford, Cork, Kerry, Limerick and Tipperary.

It is also responsible for the security of a number of "vital installations" including civil transport infrastructure sites such as Cork Harbour, Cork Airport, Shannon Airport and Farranfore Airport.

== Units ==
- Brigade HQ - Collins Barracks, Cork
- 1st Infantry Battalion (Galway)
- 3rd Infantry Battalion (Kilkenny)
- 12th Infantry Battalion (Limerick)
- 1st Artillery Regiment (Cork)
- 1st Cavalry Squadron (Cork)
- 1st Communication and Information Services Company (Cork)
- 1st Engineer Group (Cork)
- 1st Supply & Transport Group (Cork)
- 1st Ordnance Group (Cork)
- 1st Military Police Company (Cork)
- Army No. 2 Band

== Barracks ==
- Collins Barracks, Cork
- Sarsfield Barracks, Limerick
- Stephens Barracks, Kilkenny
- Dún Uí Mhaoilíosa, Galway

== Training facilities ==
- Lynch Camp, Kilworth
- Bere Island, Cork
- Fort Davis, Cork
- Carnagh Camp, Athlone
