= Langham Industries =

British port-operating company

- Industry: Marine services
- Predecessor: Stone Manganese Marine
- Founded: 1980
- Founder: John Langham
- Headquarters: Dorchester, Dorset
- Key people: Chris Langham (chairman)
- Subsidiaries: Stone Foundries
- Website: langhamindustries.co.uk

Langham Industries is a British company that owns Portland Port and formerly owned Appledore Shipbuilders.

== Early history and description ==
Langham Industries was founded by John Langham (1924 – 2017) in 1980 through the acquisition of propeller company Stone Manganese Marine. The company is run by John Langham's children with Chris Langham as the company chairman in 2019.

The company is headquartered in Dorchester, Dorset and is a sister company of Langham Wine Estate, located in the same city.

== Activities and history ==
The company purchased Stone Foundries in 1982.

Langham Industries bought Portland Port from the Ministry of Defence in 1996 and took full control from the Royal Navy in 1997, developing the port into a commercial success serving British military vessels, cargo vessels and cruise ships. In 2023, the port generated income from berthing fees from hosting the Bibby Stockholm refugee accommodation vessel.

The company previously owned Appledore Shipbuilders in Bideford, having purchased the site from the UK Government in 1989. The company leased the yard to Babcock International. Babcock operated the yard until 2019. In 2020, Langham Industries sold the shipyard to InfraStrata for £7 million.

Langham Industries has donated over £70,000 to the UK Independence Party, according to the Daily Mirror.

== See also ==
- British Shipbuilders
