= Samuel Beckett-class offshore patrol vessel =

Class of Irish warships

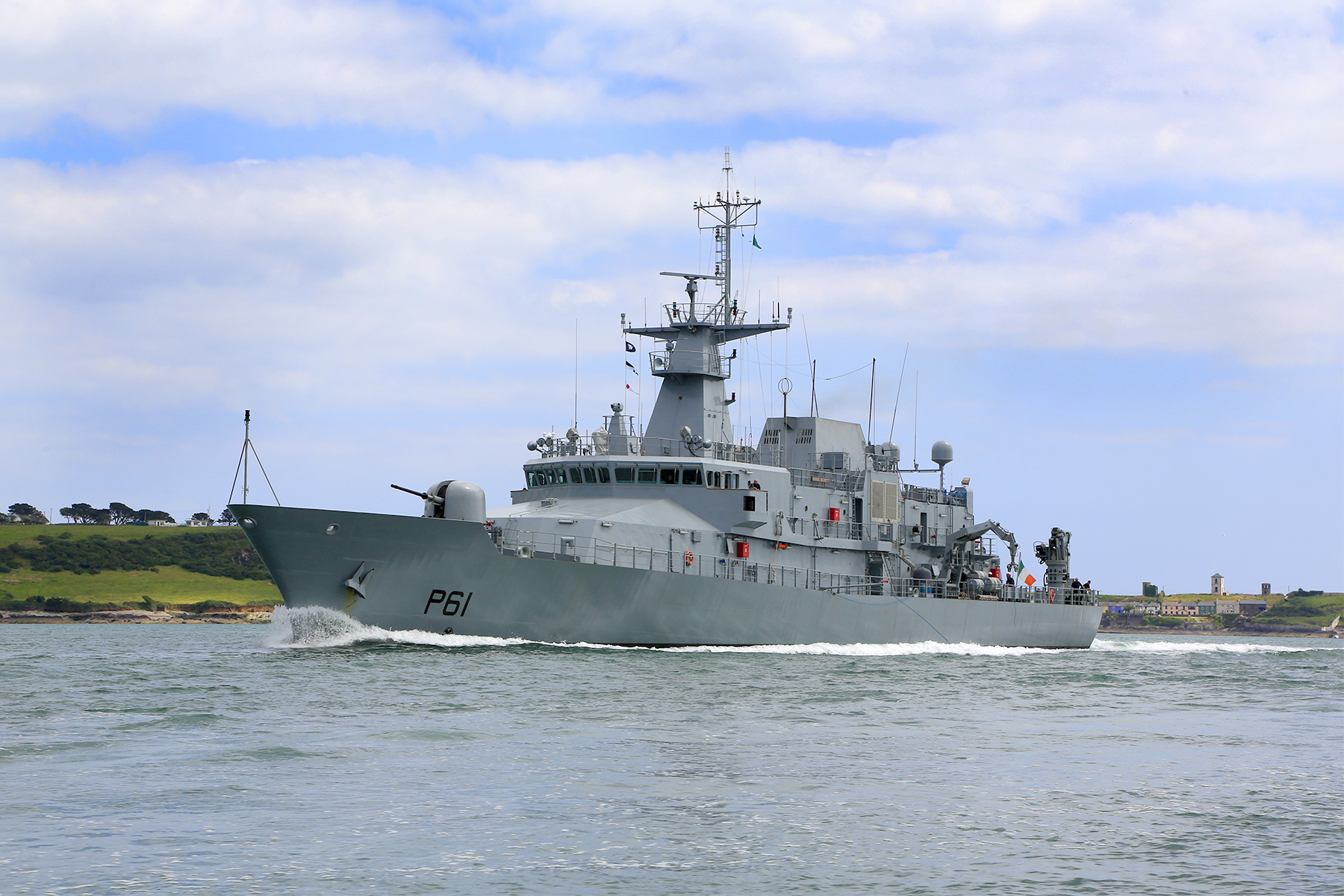
- Samuel Beckett shortly after commissioning

Class overview
- Name: Samuel Beckett class
- Builders: Appledore Shipbuilders
- Operators: (Republic of Ireland) Irish Naval Service
- Preceded by: Róisín class
- Cost: €71.9 million per unit including main gun
- In commission: As of December 2018
- Planned: 4
- Completed: 4
- Active: 4

General characteristics
- Type: Offshore patrol vessel
- Displacement: 2,256 tonnes
- Length: 90 m (295 ft 3 in)
- Beam: 14 m (45 ft 11 in)
- Draught: 3.8 m (12 ft 6 in)
- Propulsion: Two Wärtsilä medium speed diesel engines (5,440 kW (7,300 hp) each) 450 kW bow thruster
- Speed: Baseline speed 23 knots (43 km/h; 26 mph); Economical speed 15 knots (28 km/h; 17 mph)
- Range: 6,000 nautical miles (11,000 km; 6,900 mi) at 15 knots (28 km/h; 17 mph)
- Endurance: 21 days
- Boats & landing craft carried: 3 × 8 m (26 ft) RHIB
- Capacity: 3 × 6.1 m (20 ft) sea container, 1 x 5 ton, 9.56 m (31.4 ft) crane aft
- Complement: 44 + up to 10 trainees
- Sensors & processing systems: Fire control: Electro Optical
- Armament: 1 × 76 mm Oto Melara cannon; 2 × 20 mm Rheinmetall cannon; Mountings for 7.62 mm GPMG & .50 calibre HMG (M2 Browning) machine guns
- Aviation facilities: UAV only

The Samuel Beckett-class offshore patrol vessel is a class of offshore patrol vessels (OPV) ordered by the Irish Naval Service from October 2010. The first vessel is named Samuel Beckett and was commissioned in May 2014. Construction on this first vessel commenced in November 2011, A further three vessels were named James Joyce, William Butler Yeats and George Bernard Shaw, and delivered in 2015, 2016 and 2018 respectively.

== Background and design ==
Vard Marine Inc. (formerly STX Marine) designed the vessels, which have features in common with an earlier design, the Róisín class, in service with the Irish Naval Service since 1999.

The 90-metre (300 ft) OPV vessels are designated PV90 by Babcock Marine and approximately 10 metres (33 ft) longer with an additional 0.6 metres (2 ft 0 in) in depth to the existing Róisín-class PV80 vessels. This was intended to increase both its capabilities and abilities in the rough waters of the North Atlantic. The PV90 ship is designed to carry a crew of 44 and have space for up to 10 trainees. The ships' published cruising speed is 16 knots (30 km/h; 18 mph), with a top speed of 23 knots (43 km/h; 26 mph).

The New Zealand Navy uses an 85-metre (279 ft) version of the Vard Marine Inc. OPV design, referred to as the Protector-class offshore patrol vessel. This is a modified version of the older Irish Naval Service Róisín-class PV80 vessels - with helideck and hangar incorporated.

The Samuel Beckett-class ships are designed to carry remotely operated submersibles and a decompression chamber for divers. This is intended to add enhanced capabilities to undertake search and rescue, search and recovery, undersea exploration, and increased sea area surveillance. The expanded deck area would also allow the Naval Service to potentially deploy unmanned aerial vehicles for the first time. Features also include Dynamic Positioning systems and "Power Take In Systems" to enable fuel savings, as the main engines can be shut down and power sourced from battery storage or a smaller more economical engine.

The first new ship was commissioned on 17 May 2014 - to replace Emer which was decommissioned on 20 September 2013.

== Planning and construction ==
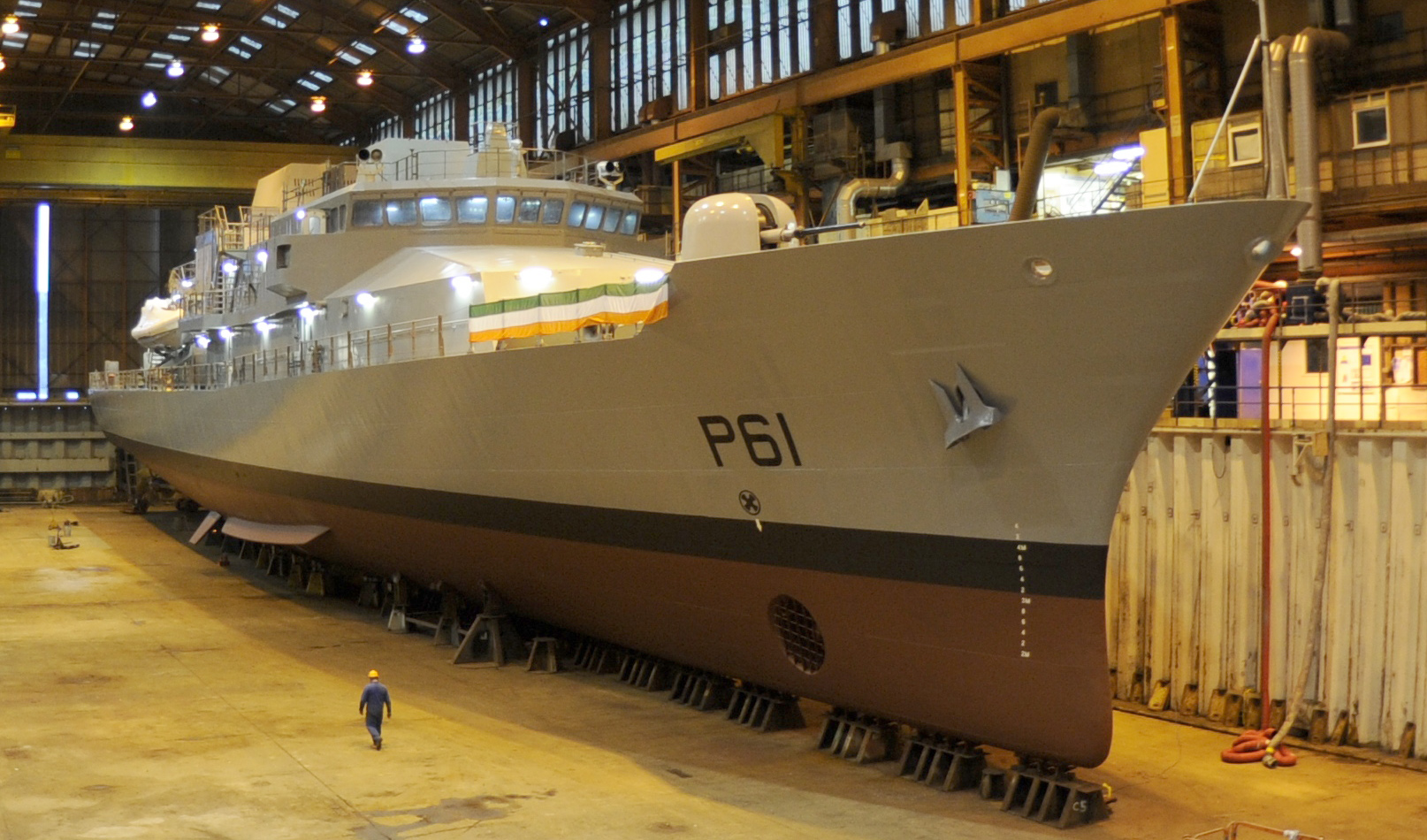
Samuel Beckett under construction

In 2007 it was reported that the Defence Forces expected to spend in the region of €180m on replacements for the three existing vessels of the Emer class.

In July 2010 the then Irish Minister for Defence, Tony Killeen, announced that the Department of Defence and Naval Service would be entering into talks with UK shipbuilder Babcock Marine on two vessels worth €50m each, with an option for a third.

In October 2010 contracts were signed, and the 'cutting of steel' for the first ship occurred on 24 November 2011.

On 19 May 2012, Irish Naval Service Flag Office Commodore Mark Mellett (subsequently Rear Admiral, DCOS Sp) attended the traditional keel-laying ceremony for the first of the 90 meter OPVs. While modular construction methods don't strictly involve keel-laying, the term is still considered an important milestone, as it signals the first stage of connecting each of the components together. The keel-laying ceremony took place in Babcock Marine's Appledore Shipbuilders Yard in Devon.

The delivery of the first of the vessels was set for 2014 with the second in 2015. The fit-out of crew quarters and facilities on the first two 55-berth ships was contracted to Moss Marine of Southampton in a £4.5 million contract. Fitting out of the first ship began in March 2012 for completion in early 2014.

The option on the third vessel was exercised following the commissioning of Samuel Beckett, and delivered in 2016. Payment for the ships was planned to be extended over a number of years to 2017. The cost of the first three ships, including the main armament, was €213 million. While not overtly proposed under the original contract, the Irish government placed an order for a fourth vessel in June 2016, in a contract worth €67 million.

== Systems ==
Onboard systems include Mercury IP communication systems from communications and broadcast equipment vendors Trilogy. Each vessel is equipped with two such communications systems. The first uses VHF, UHF and HF marine radio channels on panels installed throughout the vessel. The second system aims to connect users in pre-configured work groups using interfaces installed at work stations around each vessel.

Three ships of the class are slated to receive the Thales CAPTAS-1 towed array sonar by 2027, as well as a new medium-range air search radar, electronic warfare systems, and a new upgraded Super Rapid main gun, with improved anti-air capabilities.

== Names ==
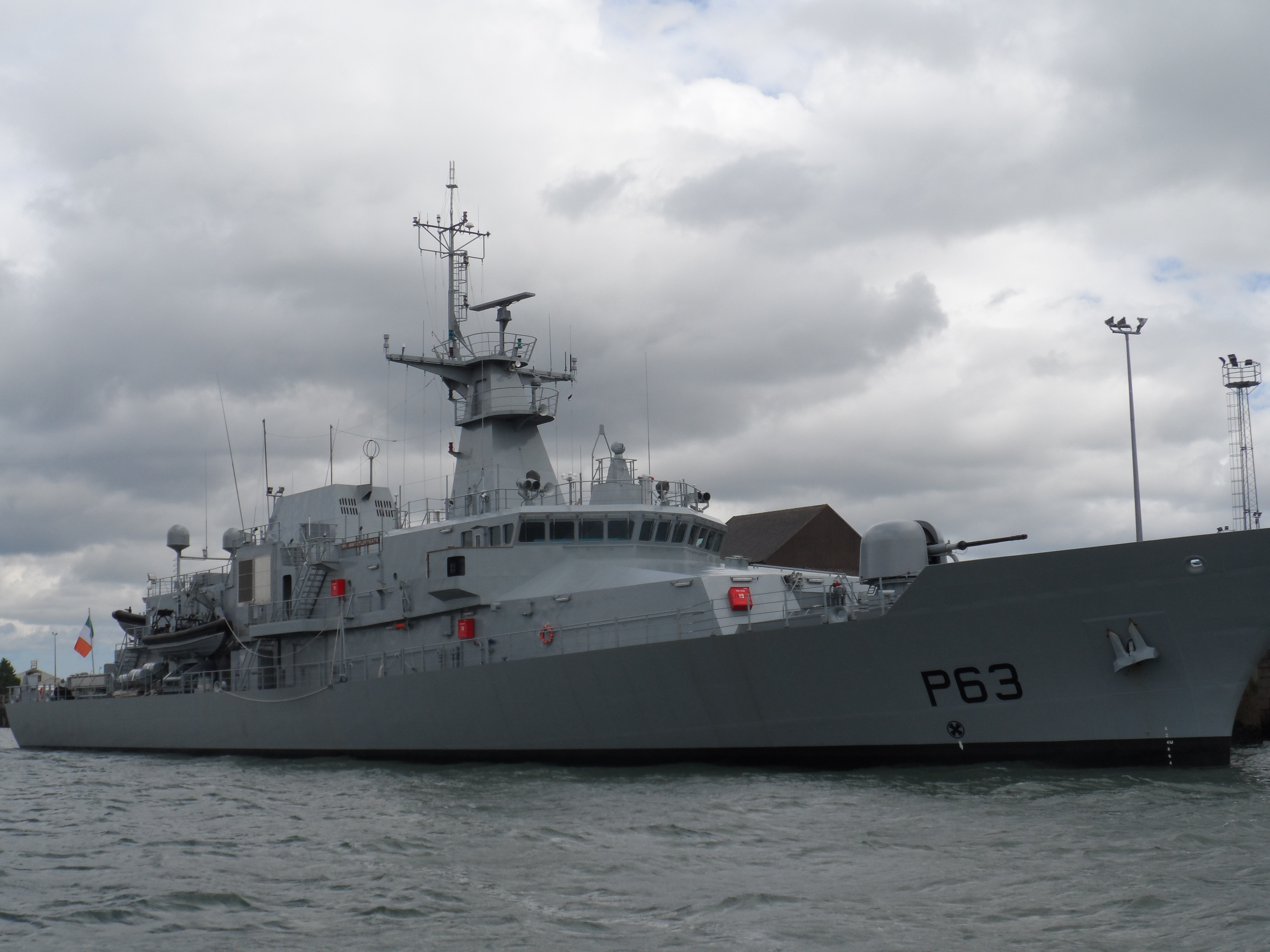
William Butler Yeats in July 2016

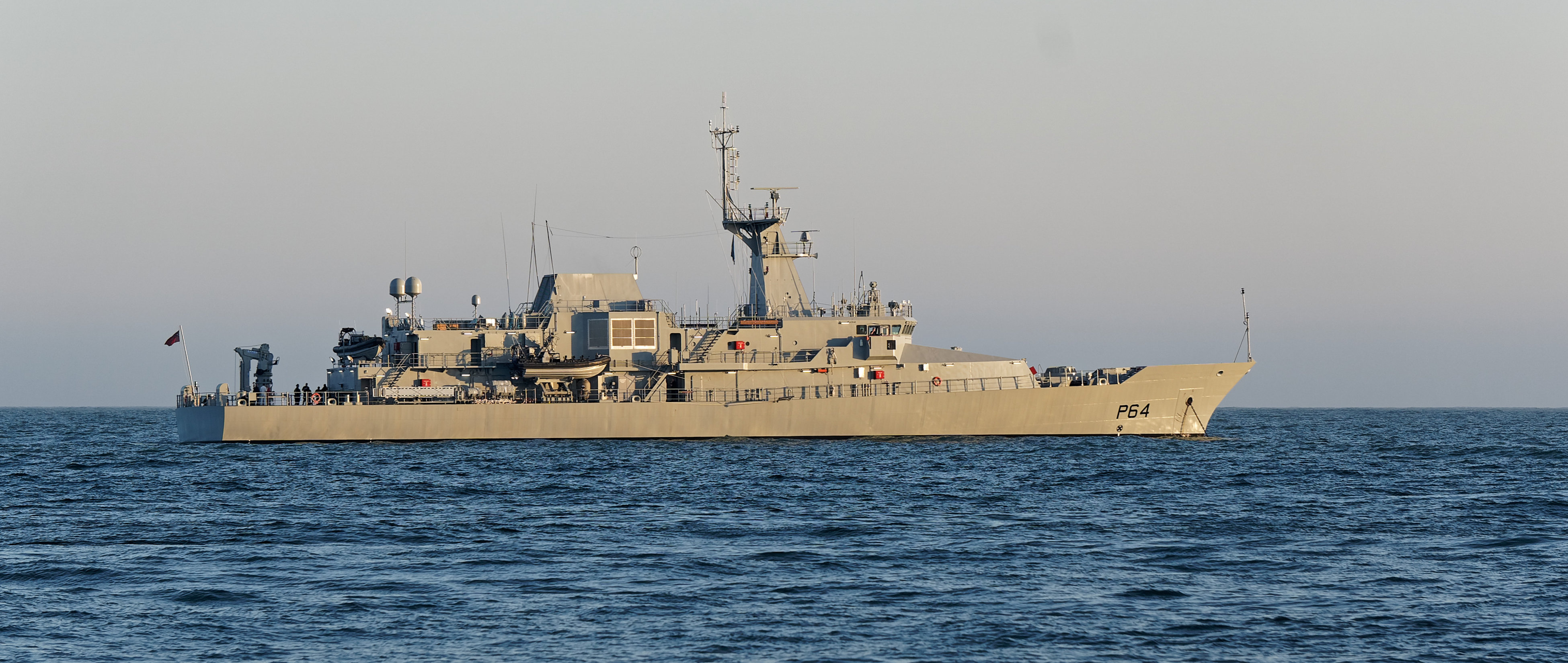
George Bernard Shaw

The first two ships were named for Samuel Beckett and James Joyce, as disclosed in July 2013 by the then Minister for Defence Alan Shatter in Dáil Éireann. This decision to name the ships after literary figures, seen as controversial in some quarters, saw a break from the tradition of naming Irish Naval vessels after women in Irish mythology.

In July 2015, the then Minister for Defence Simon Coveney declared that the third vessel would be named after William Butler Yeats. At the keel-laying ceremony for the fourth vessel, on 28 February 2017, then Minister of State at the Department of Defence Paul Kehoe announced that the vessel would be named after George Bernard Shaw.

== Ships ==
Name	Pennant number	Builder	Laid down	Floated out	Commissioned	Status
Samuel Beckett	P61	Babcock Marine Appledore	19 May 2012	3 November 2013	17 May 2014	Active in service
James Joyce	P62	Babcock Marine Appledore	5 November 2013	23 November 2014	1 September 2015	Active in service
William Butler Yeats	P63	Babcock Marine Appledore	26 November 2014	10 March 2016	17 October 2016	Active in service
George Bernard Shaw	P64	Babcock Marine Appledore	28 February 2017	2 March 2018	30 April 2019	Active in service
