= 3rd Infantry Battalion (Ireland) =

- 3ú Cathlán Coisithe
- Shoulder flash of the 3rd Infantry Battalion
- Active: 1 January 1923 – present
- Country: Ireland
- Branch: Army
- Type: Infantry
- Size: Battalion
- Part of: 1st Brigade
- Headquarters: Stephens Barracks, Kilkenny
- Nickname: The Bloods
- Motto: Dilis go Bráth
- Anniversaries: 1 January

The 3rd Infantry Battalion (3rd Inf Bn; Irish: 3ú Cathlán Coisithe) is one of the seven current infantry battalions of the Irish Army. It is the oldest still established unit of the Army, and is headquartered in Stephens Barracks, Kilkenny as part of 1st Brigade.

== History ==
The battalion traces its history back to January 1923, when the unit was formed from several units based near Drumboe, County Donegal. When the Irish Civil War concluded later that year, the battalion was transferred to Boyle, County Roscommon and in 1927 it was transferred to its permanent home in the Curragh Camp, where it became the Army’s demonstration unit. At the start of Emergency in 1939, the battalion occupied positions in Portlaoise, Kilkenny and Waterford and in May 1940 it formed the core of the 1st Mobile Column, responsible for the defence of Waterford and Wexford. In 1941 the battalion became the spearhead of the newly formed 5th Infantry Brigade, responsible for defending the southeast of the country from possible invasion. In 1946, the battalion returned to Connolly Barracks in the Curragh Camp. In 1960, many members deployed to the Congo with ONUC, and five DSMs were awarded to serving or former members of the battalion. From 1969, the unit was heavily committed to internal security duties. In 1998, the 30th Infantry Battalion was amalgamated into the 3rd Infantry Battalion. Personnel from the battalion have seen service all over the world as part of Irish peacekeeping contingents, both within and outside the structure of the United Nations. Today, the battalion forms part of 1st Brigade, contributing soldiers not only for the defence and security of the Republic of Ireland, but also for deployment overseas. In 2006 the battalion contributed to the formation of the 95th Infantry Battalion, made up of personnel from the then 1st Southern Brigade, which deployed as part of the UNMIL mission to Liberia. The battalion is now stationed at Stephens Barracks in Kilkenny.

The battalion has served in various UN missions in trouble spots abroad including Congo, Lebanon, Liberia and Cyprus.

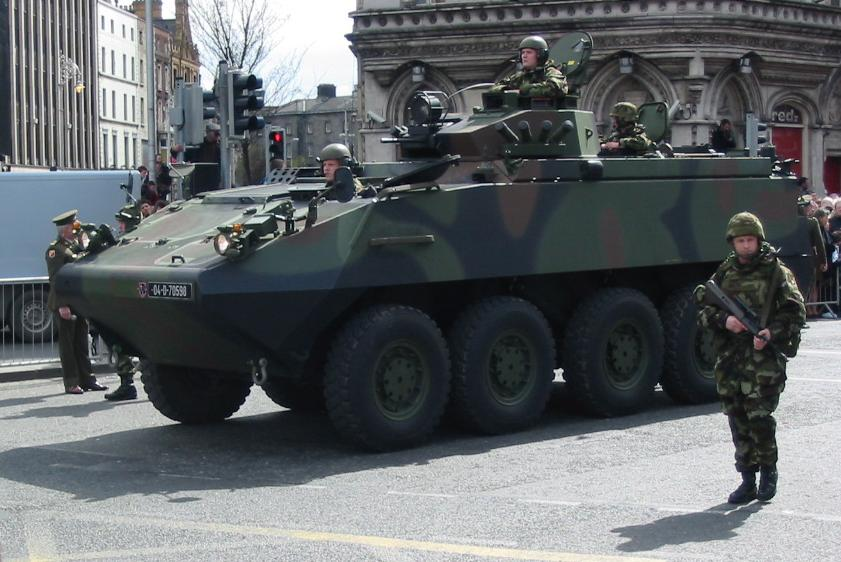
Members of the 3rd Infantry Battalion man a Mowag Piranha at the 2006 Easter parade Dublin.

Prior to the re-organisation in 2012, B Company was stationed separately from the rest of the battalion, and served as the training unit for the Mowag Piranha APC, part of the Defence Forces Training Centre. Subsequently, this was split and renamed as the 1st Mechanised Infantry Company.
