= LÉ William Butler Yeats =

Ship built in 2016

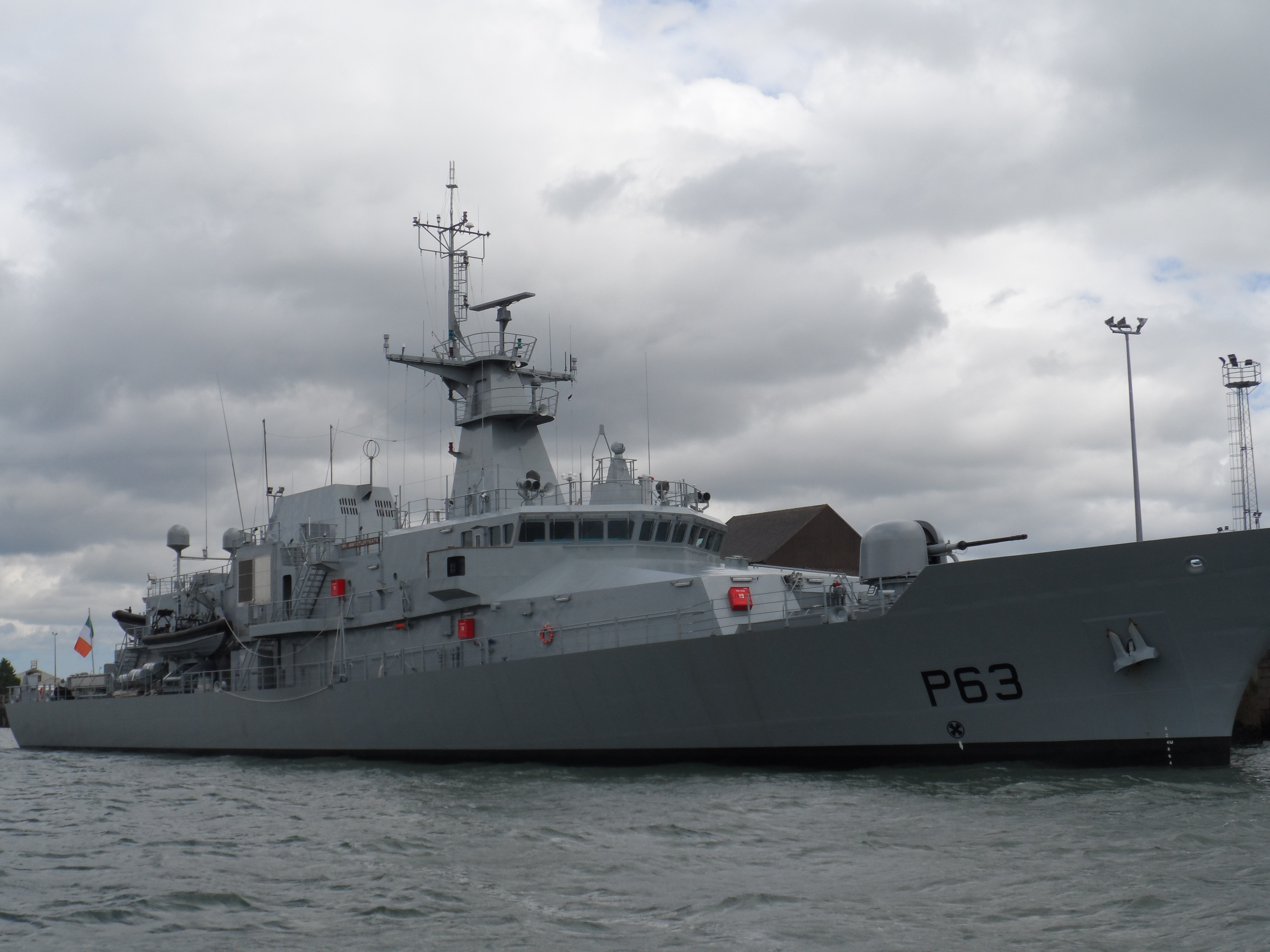
- LÉ William Butler Yeats at Haulbowline, July 2016

History

Ireland
- Name: LÉ William Butler Yeats
- Namesake: W. B. Yeats, Irish poet
- Builder: Babcock Marine Appledore, North Devon
- Cost: €71 million
- Launched: 10 March 2016
- Sponsored by: Caitriona Yeats
- Christened: 17 October 2016
- Commissioned: 17 October 2016
- Identification: IMO number: 9751494; MMSI number: 250003811; Callsign: EIYU; Hull number: P63
- Status: In active service

General characteristics
- Class & type: Samuel Beckett-class offshore patrol vessel
- Displacement: 2,256 tonnes
- Length: 90.00 m (295.28 ft)
- Beam: 14.00 m (45.93 ft)
- Range: 6,000 nmi (11,000 km; 6,900 mi)
- Armament: 1 × 76 mm cannon; 2 × 20 mm cannon; 2 × 7.62 mm GPMG; 2 x .50 calibre HMG

LÉ William Butler Yeats (P63) is a Samuel Beckett-class offshore patrol vessel of the Irish Naval Service. Named after poet W. B. Yeats, the ship is the third in a series of vessels designed by Vard Marine and built by Babcock Marine Appledore. The ship was floated out of the shipyard in March 2016, started trials in July 2016, and arrived at Haulbowline naval base in late July 2016. The ship was formally commissioned in a ceremony in Galway on 17 October 2016. During the ceremony, it was officially named by a granddaughter of the poet, Caitriona Yeats.

== Operational history ==
In March 2020 the Naval Service provided the vessel to the HSE as a testing centre to be docked at Galway as part of Irish response to the coronavirus pandemic.

In September 2023, LÉ William Butler Yeats was involved in the interception of MV Matthew, a bulk carrier, that was found to be carrying 2,253 kg (4,967 lb) of cocaine, worth €173 million.

In December 2025, crew from the vessel who were "monitoring maritime activity" observed unidentified drones near the flight path of Volodymyr Zelenskyy's jet during a state visit to Ireland.

== See also ==
- LÉ Samuel Beckett (P61)
- LÉ James Joyce (P62)
- LÉ George Bernard Shaw (P64)
