= LÉ Samuel Beckett =

Samuel Beckett-class Irish Naval Service vessel

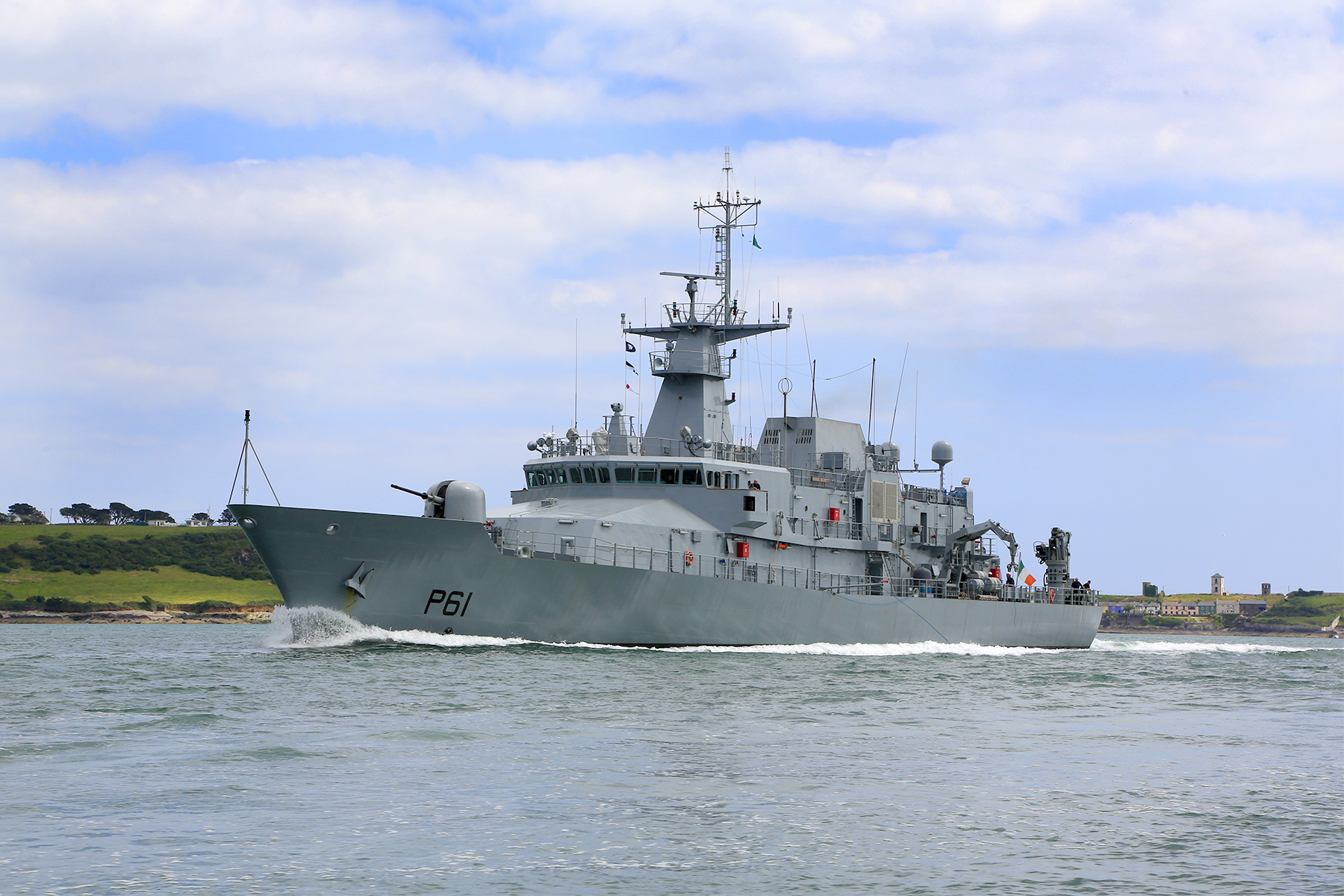
- LÉ Samuel Beckett in 2014

History

Ireland
- Name: LÉ Samuel Beckett
- Namesake: Samuel Beckett, Irish playwright and author
- Ordered: October 2010
- Builder: Babcock Marine Appledore, North Devon
- Cost: €71 million
- Laid down: 19 May 2012
- Launched: November 2013
- Acquired: January 2014
- Commissioned: 17 May 2014
- Identification: IMO number: 9614660; MMSI number: 250002868; Hull number: P61
- Status: in active service

General characteristics
- Class & type: Samuel Beckett-class offshore patrol vessel
- Displacement: 2,256 tonnes Standard
- Length: 90.00 m (295.28 ft)
- Beam: 14.00 m (45.93 ft)
- Draught: 3.8 m (12 ft)
- Installed power: 10,000 kW (13,000 hp)
- Propulsion: 2 x Wärtsilä diesel engines
- Speed: 15 kn (28 km/h; 17 mph) cruise; 23 kn (43 km/h; 26 mph) maximum
- Range: 6,000 nmi (11,000 km; 6,900 mi)
- Boats & landing craft carried: 3 MST 8 m (26 ft) RHIBS
- Complement: 54 (44 crew + 10 trainees)
- Armament: 1 × OTO Melara 76 mm cannon; 2 × 20 mm Rheinmetall Rh202 cannons; 2 × 12.7 mm Heavy Machine Guns; 4 × 7.62 mm FN MAG
- Aviation facilities: UAV capabilities only

LÉ Samuel Beckett (P61) is a Samuel Beckett-class offshore patrol vessel (OPV) of the Irish Naval Service. The ship was launched in November 2013 and commissioned in May 2014. She is named after Irish playwright and author Samuel Beckett.

Like other OPVs in the Irish Naval Service, the ship's primary mission is fisheries protection, search and rescue, and maritime protection operations, including vessel boardings.

== Development ==
=== Design ===
In October 2010, the Irish Naval Service ordered a number of new offshore patrol vessels from Babcock Marine, a UK-based shipbuilder operating out of Appledore, North Devon. The first two vessels were named Samuel Beckett and James Joyce respectively, and planned to replace LÉ Emer (decommissioned September 2013; sold October 2013) and Aoife (decommissioned January 2015; commissioned in the Maritime Squadron of the Armed Forces of Malta June 2015).

Like the Róisín-class OPV, Samuel Beckett was designed by Vard Marine to a VARD 7 series design. Although similar to the Róisín-class OPV, Samuel Beckett is over 10 metres (33 ft) longer, intended to increase its capabilities in the rough waters of the North Atlantic. The ship is designed to carry a crew of 44 and have space for up to 10 trainees.

Additionally, Samuel Beckett is designed to carry remotely operated submersibles and a decompression chamber for divers. The expanded deck area would allow the ship to deploy unmanned surveillance planes.

=== Construction and naming ===
Although the ship was built using modern modular construction techniques, the keel was deemed to have been "laid down" during a keel-laying ceremony held at the Appledore Shipbuilding Yard on 19 May 2012 after the first two major components were connected together.

In July 2013, while still under construction, the name of the vessel, Samuel Beckett was announced by the Minister for Defence Alan Shatter in Dáil Éireann.

=== Propulsion ===
The ship is powered by a pair of 16-cylinder W16V26F Wärtsilä diesel motors driving twin shafts that can propel the vessel to a top speed of 23 knots (43 km/h; 26 mph). The ship is also equipped with dynamic positioning systems and a power take-in (PTI) drive, to enable fuel savings as the main engines can be shut down and switched to alternative power sources such as stored battery power or a smaller more economical engine.

== Operational history ==
The ship was completed and floated out of the shipyard in November 2013, delivered in April 2014 and commissioned for service in May 2014. The vessel was "twinned" with Cork city in a ceremony held on 7 June 2014.

In late 2015 Samuel Beckett was deployed to the Mediterranean as part of Ireland's contribution to the humanitarian response to the European migrant crisis. During the ship's cruise, more than 1,000 migrants were rescued. In one event, 111 people were rescued in a United Nations operation off the coast of Libya.

The vessel was redeployed to the area in 2016, and on 17 November 2016 rescued 50 migrants who were on a rubber boat 25 Nautical Miles North-west of Tripoli. This brought the number of migrants rescued by the Samuel Beckett to 2310.

In March 2020 the Naval Service provided the vessel to the HSE as a testing centre to be docked at Sir John Rogerson's Quay as part of Irish response to the coronavirus pandemic.

== See also ==
- LÉ James Joyce (P62)
- LÉ William Butler Yeats (P63)
- LÉ George Bernard Shaw (P64)
