= Stephens Barracks =

Irish military installation

- Dún Mhic Stiofáin
- Kilkenny, Ireland
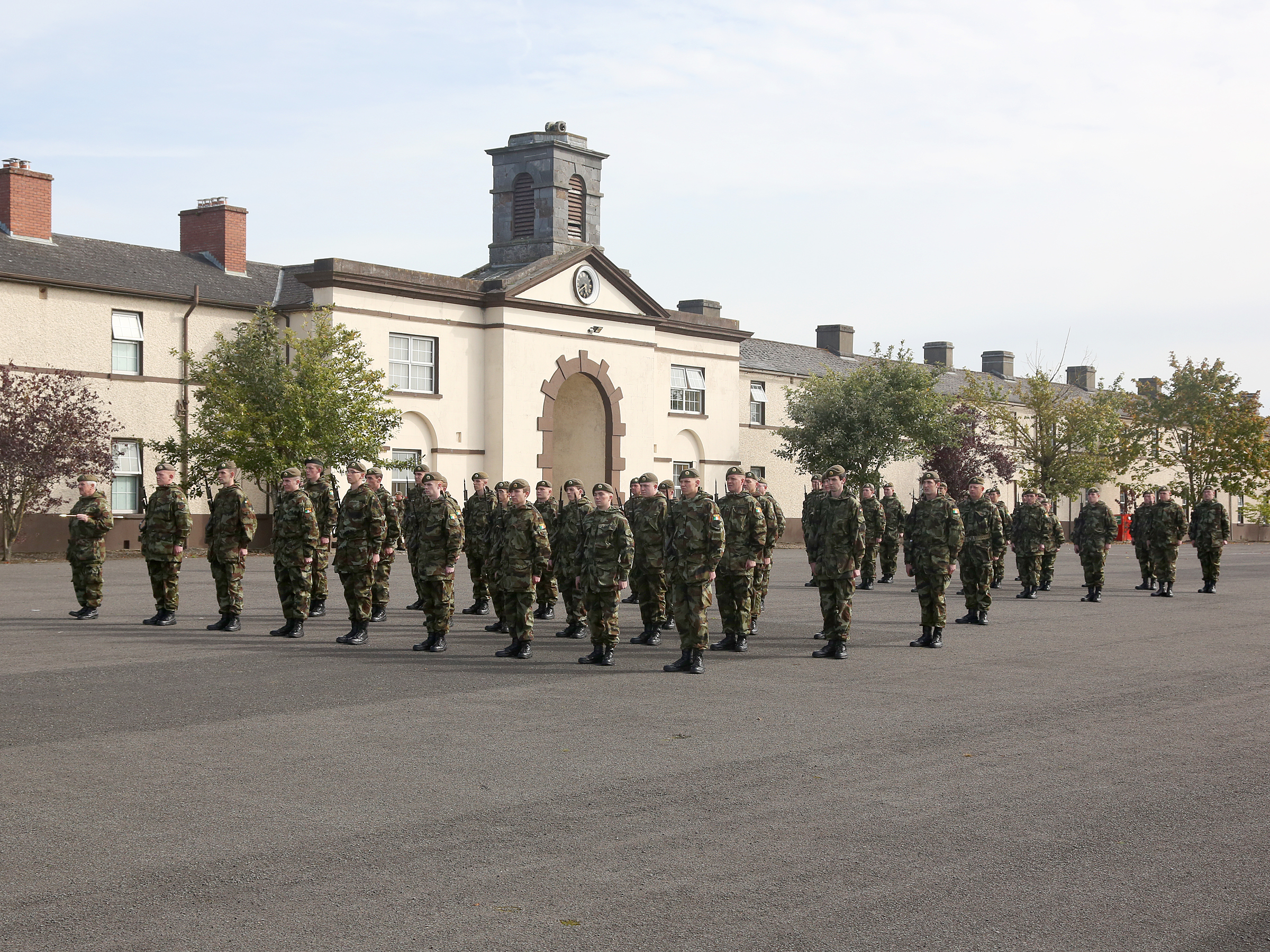
- Army Reserve recruits passing out parade at Stephens Barracks

Site information
- Type: Barracks
- Operator: (Republic of Ireland) Irish Army

Location
- Location within Ireland
- Coordinates: 52.65945°N 7.24763°W

Site history
- Built: 1800-1803
- Built for: War Office
- In use: 1803-Present

Garrison information
- Garrison: 3rd Infantry Battalion, Irish Army

Stephens Barracks (Irish: Dún Mhic Stiofáin) is a military installation in Kilkenny, Ireland.

== History ==
The barracks were built by James Switzer (then spelled Switser) on land provided by the Earl of Ormond as part of the response to the Irish Rebellion and completed between 1800 and 1803. The site was provided by William Butler, 6th Earl of Ormond on the North East of the city. Construction was to a standard plan similar to barracks being built in Templemore and Mullingar. On completion, sufficient material remained to construct “an asylum to cater for the needs of twenty women”, the present day Switser's Home in Kilkenny.

A garrison church was added in 1852. Married quarters were provided to the east of the barracks in the 1850s, continuing in their original use until 1995 when they were handed over to Kilkenny Corporation for redevelopment as local authority housing.

Following the Anglo-Irish Treaty the barracks was handed over to the forces of the Irish Free State in 1922 and renamed after James Stephens, the Irish Republican leader, in 1969. The barracks was occupied by a number of different units between the end of the Civil War and the start of the Emergency (as the Second World War was officially termed in Ireland). This period saw a considerable expansion of the number of personnel accommodated in both the barracks and other locations in the city. Following the end of the Emergency, the strength was again reduced to cadres for reserve elements.

In 1971 A Company, 3 Infantry Battalion was moved to the barracks from the Curragh and in 1977 this was incorporated into the newly formed 30 Infantry Battalion. This remained the main unit in the garrison until its disbandment in 1998. The barracks is now the home to the 3 Infantry Battalion.

== See also ==
- List of Irish military installations
