= LÉ George Bernard Shaw =

Ship built in 2018

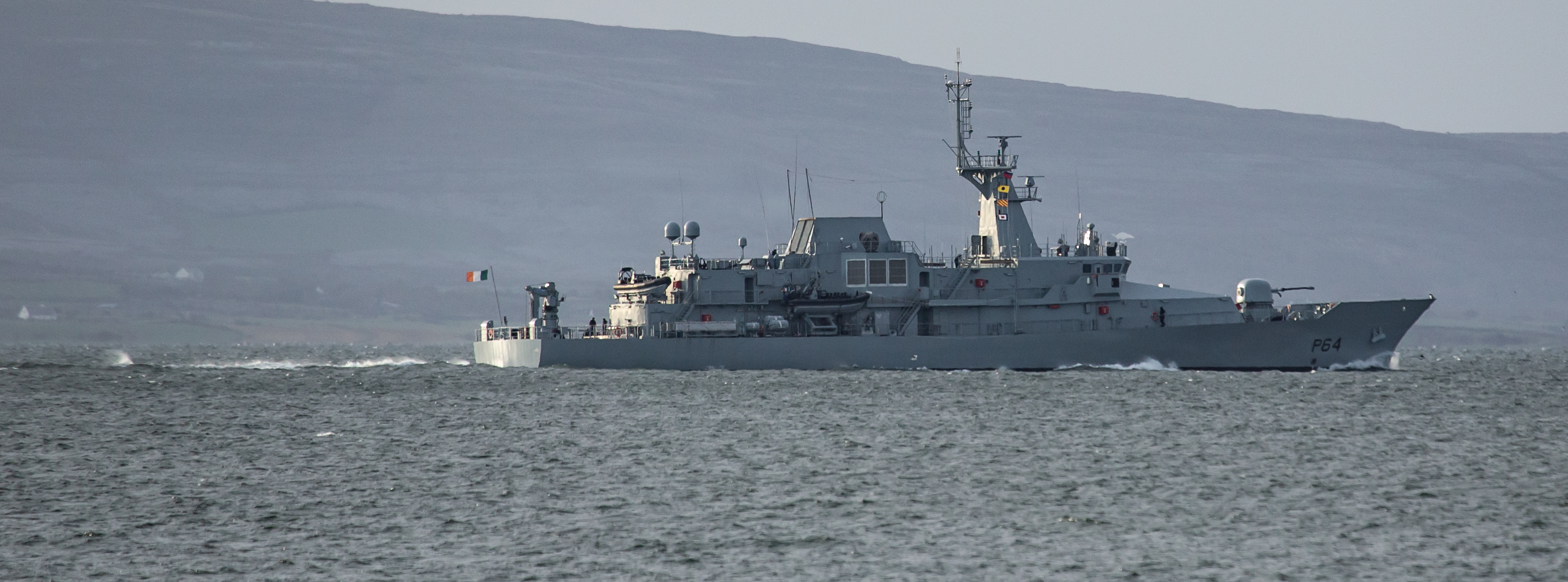
- LÉ George Bernard Shaw moving through Galway Bay, Ireland

History

Ireland
- Name: LÉ George Bernard Shaw
- Namesake: George Bernard Shaw, Irish playwright
- Builder: Babcock Marine Appledore, North Devon
- Cost: €67 million
- Laid down: 28 February 2017
- Launched: 2 March 2018
- Commissioned: 30 April 2019
- Identification: IMO number: 9814519; MMSI number: 250004884; Callsign: EIYW; Hull number: P64
- Status: In active service

General characteristics
- Class & type: Samuel Beckett-class offshore patrol vessel
- Displacement: 2,256 tonnes
- Length: 90.00 m (295.28 ft)
- Beam: 14.00 m (45.93 ft)
- Speed: 23 knots (43 km/h; 26 mph)
- Range: 6,000 nmi (11,000 km; 6,900 mi)
- Armament: 1 × OTO Melara 76 mm cannon; 2 × Rheinmetall Rh202 20 mm cannon; 4 × 7.62 mm GPMG or .50 calibre HMGs

LÉ George Bernard Shaw (P64) is a Samuel Beckett-class offshore patrol vessel (OPV) of the Irish Naval Service. It is the fourth ship in a series of vessels designed by Vard Marine and built by Babcock Marine Appledore, and is named for the writer George Bernard Shaw.

Constructed in Devon, England, the vessel underwent keel laying in February 2017. The vessel was first floated-out of the dry dock during March 2018, and was delivered to Haulbowline Naval Base on 11 October 2018, pending final fitting out, including installation of the main 76 mm cannon.

In December 2018, the vessel was made available for tours by the public in Galway, and it was formally commissioned in April 2019.

== Operational service ==
At around 1.10 am on 25 March 2020 a burglary occurred while the vessel was docked at Sir John Rogerson's Quay. A man in his 30s was arrested and charged in relation to the incident, appearing before the courts the afternoon of 25 March.

== Gallery ==
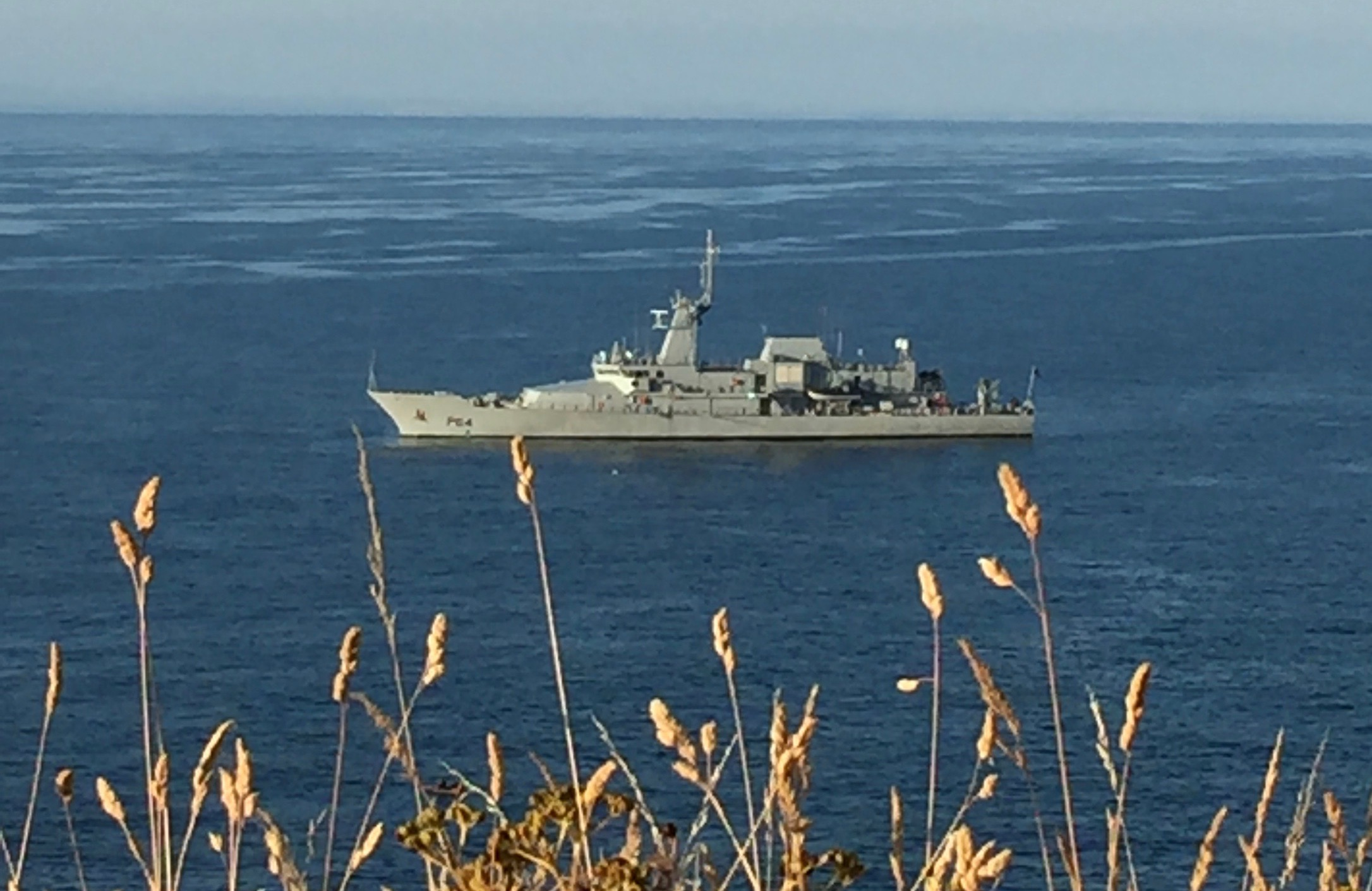
LÉ George Bernard Shaw off Ilfracombe in 2018

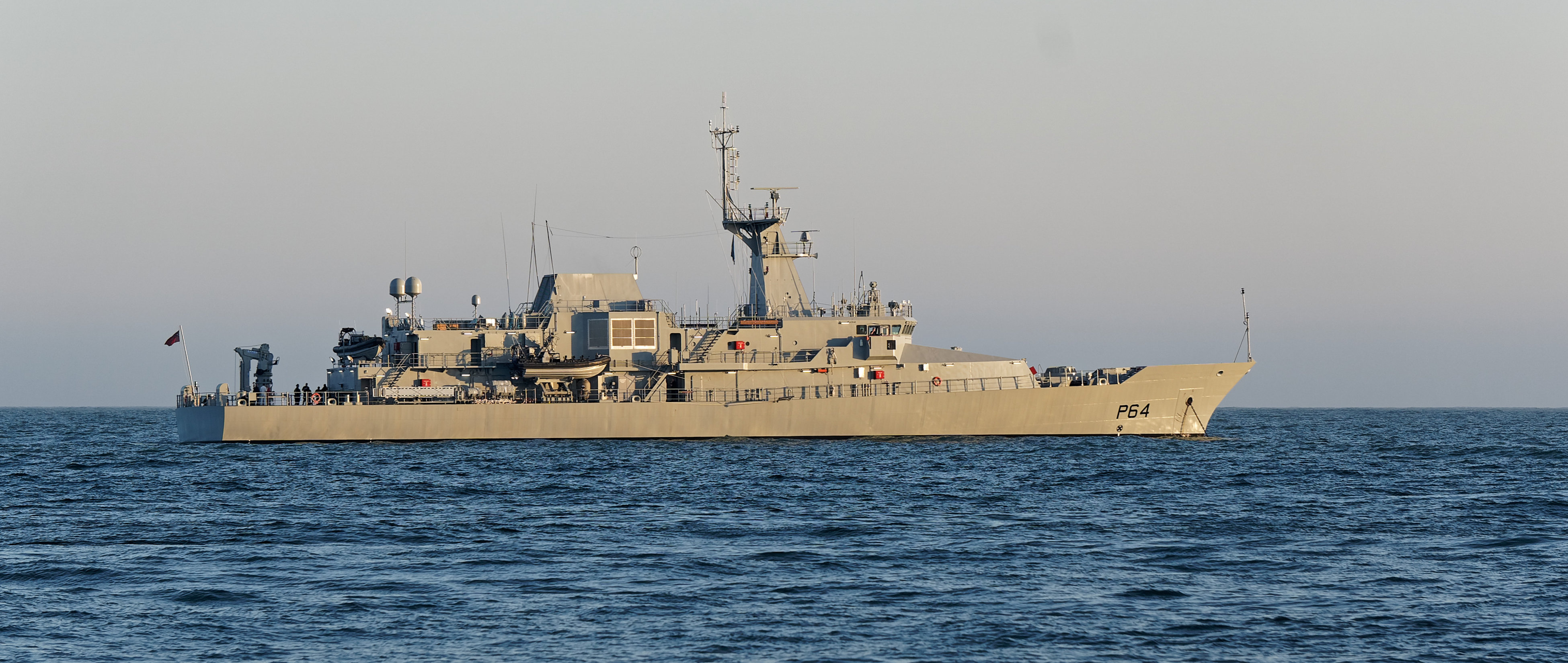
Anchored off Ilfracombe, North Devon, UK October 2018

== See also ==
- LÉ Samuel Beckett (P61)
- LÉ James Joyce (P62)
- LÉ William Butler Yeats (P63)
