= LÉ James Joyce =

Irish Naval Service patrol vessel

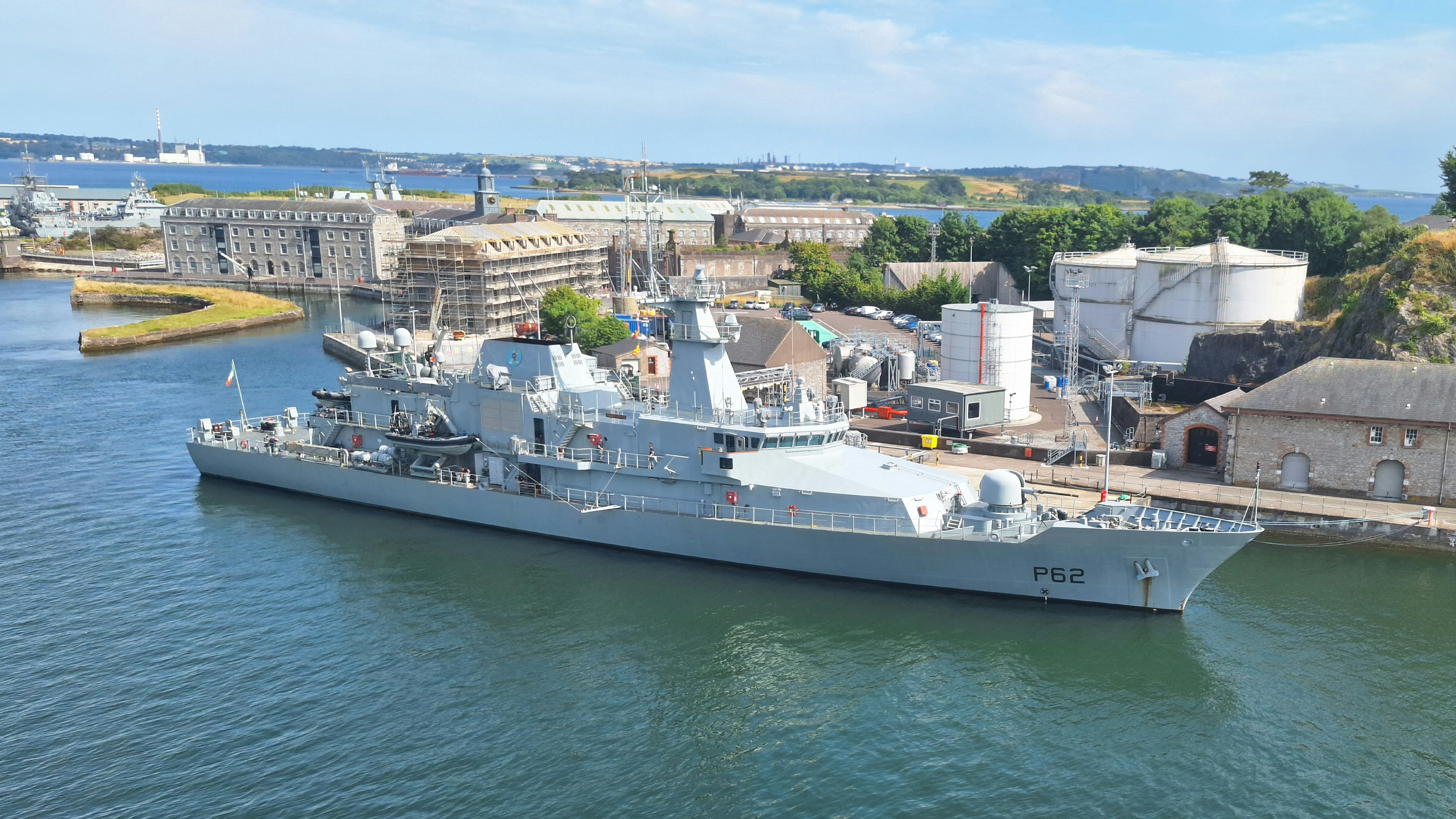
- LÉ James Joyce moored at Haulbowline

History

Ireland
- Name: LÉ James Joyce
- Namesake: James Joyce, Irish novelist and poet
- Ordered: October 2010
- Builder: Babcock Marine Appledore, North Devon
- Cost: €71 million
- Laid down: November 2013
- Launched: 23 November 2014
- Sponsored by: Carol Joyce
- Christened: 1 September 2015
- Commissioned: 1 September 2015
- Identification: IMO number: 9614672; MMSI number: 250003146; Callsign: EIYZ; Hull number: P62
- Status: in active service

General characteristics
- Class & type: Samuel Beckett-class offshore patrol vessel
- Displacement: 2,256 tonnes Standard
- Length: 90.00 m (295.28 ft)
- Beam: 14.00 m (45.93 ft)
- Speed: 15 kn (28 km/h; 17 mph) cruise; 23 kn (43 km/h; 26 mph) maximum
- Range: 6,000 nmi (11,000 km; 6,900 mi)
- Complement: 54 (44 crew + 10 trainees)
- Armament: 1 × OTO Melara 76 mm cannon; 2 × 20 mm Rheinmetall Rh202 cannon; 2 × 12.7 mm HMG; 4 × 7.62 mm GPMG
- Aviation facilities: UAV capable

LÉ James Joyce (P62) is a Samuel Beckett-class offshore patrol vessel (OPV) which was built by Babcock Marine Appledore for the Irish Naval Service. Although criticised by a descendant of the author, the ship was named for writer James Joyce.

== Design and construction ==
In October 2010, the Irish Naval Service ordered a number of new offshore patrol vessels from Babcock Marine, a UK-based shipbuilder operating out of Appledore, North Devon. Like the similar Róisín-class OPV, James Joyce was designed by Vard Marine.

In July 2013, the name of the vessel, James Joyce was announced by the Minister for Defence Alan Shatter in Dáil Éireann.

== Operational history ==
The ship was completed and floated out of the shipyard in November 2014. Following sea-trials and a number of delays it was delivered to the Naval Service in mid-2015. The official naming and commissioning ceremony was held at Dún Laoghaire on 1 September 2015. In November 2016, personnel from the LÉ James Joyce boarded the FV Margiris as part of a fisheries inspection. On 15 November 2024, the LÉ James Joyce escorted a suspected Russian spy vessel out of the Irish Sea after it was observed operating in area "containing critical energy and internet submarine pipelines and cables".

== See also ==
- LÉ Samuel Beckett (P61)
- LÉ William Butler Yeats (P63)
- LÉ George Bernard Shaw (P64)
