= An Chéad Chathlán Coisithe =

Battalion of the Irish Army

An Chéad Cathlán Coisithe The First Infantry Battalion
- Active: June 1924 - Present
- Country: Ireland
- Branch: Army
- Type: Infantry
- Role: Light Role
- Size: Battalion
- Part of: Infantry Corps

An Chéad Chathlán Coisithe, the First Infantry Battalion in English, is an infantry battalion of the Irish Army that was historically Irish-speaking.

== History ==
The battalion was originally founded in the Curragh Camp in June 1924, before transferring to the Hibernian Schools in the Phoenix Park and taking possession of Renmore Barracks in Galway in April 1925. In this period, the battalion comprised approximately personnel, drawn mainly from the Gaeltacht areas of Connemara, Munster and Donegal.

Following the declaration of The Emergency in 1939, the battalion was deployed to positions in eastern Galway with the primary task of defending Rineanna Airfield from attack. In January 1943, the unit assisted Lt-General Jacob L. Devers (whose aircraft had crashed near Athenry) and escorted him to a US base in Northern Ireland.

In 1945, the battalion returned to Renmore Barracks. However, from the 1950s the number of eligible recruits declined to heavy emigration from the west of Ireland. By the 1970s, recruitment was confined to Connemara and by the 1980s less than a quarter of the battalion were native speakers.

The battalion was committed to internal security duties at this time. Troops from the battalion also supported several United Nations peacekeeping missions, suffering a number of casualties during the 1980s.
