= Naval Operations Command (Ireland) =

- Country: Ireland
- Branch: Naval Service
- Part of: Defence Forces
- Garrison/HQ: Naval Base Haulbowline

Commanders
- Current commander: Officer Commanding Naval Operations Command (OCNOC)

Naval Operations Command (NOC) is the principal command component of the Irish Naval Service responsible for all day-to-day activities of the service, both at sea and on shore. One of three major command components of the Naval Service (NS) this command is responsible for overseeing the work and mission objectives of all Irish naval vessels at sea who report directly to Naval Operations Command at Naval Base Haulbowline. The command is a direct subordinate to Naval Headquarters (NHQ) and is overseen by Officer Commanding Naval Operations Command (OCNOC). The OCNOC reports directly to the head of the Irish Naval Service, the Flag Officer Commanding Naval Service (FOCNS).

== Operations HQ ==
At the heart of Naval Operations Command is the Naval Operations HQ, which coordinates all the work of the NOC. Under it falls three sections: Intelligence and Fisheries, Fleet Operational Readiness Standards and Training (FORST) and Shore Operations.

== Intelligence and Fisheries ==
This section oversees naval intelligence and fisheries surveillance. Bodies within this section include:

- Naval Intelligence Cell
- Navigation Cell - provides navigational support services to the Naval Service and various client agencies.
- Naval Computer Centre
- Fisheries Monitoring Centre - a specialised unit of the NS that oversees the identification, monitoring and surveillance of fisheries vessels in Irish waters as part of the Vessel Monitoring System. The Fishery Monitoring Centre coordinates with fisheries agencies in other countries.

== Fleet Operational Readiness, Standards and Training ==
The delivery by the Naval Service (NS) of a professional service with a high degree of certainty requires specific fleet standards, quality control and the monitoring of personnel and equipment in action. The standards and quality control, of the wide variety of routines necessary to operate the fleet, are the “bedrock” of effective operations. Their importance heightens when the ship tasking becomes more complex and when ships combine into task forces for particular operations. It was, therefore, deemed important to establish an organic operational evaluation capability in order to meet the delivery of Government/DF/NS operational requirements.

In September 2008, the Flag Officer Commanding Naval Service (FOCNS) directed the establishment of the NS Fleet Operational Readiness, Standards and Training (FORST) Section within Naval Operations Command (NOC).

The sections mission statement is “To assist in the provision of Generation, Maintenance and Evaluation of Operational Capability to NS Ships through professional support, evaluation and coaching”.

== Shore Operations ==
- Naval Service Operations Room
- Ops Security Section - provides security for base operations at Haulbowline.
- Naval Base Comcen - operates and maintains the base phone and communications systems.
- Boat Transport - operated by the harbour master providing ferry services between Haulbowline and the mainland as well as all berthage operations at the base.
- Naval Service Diving Section
