= LÉ Eithne =

Former patrol vessel in the Irish Naval Service

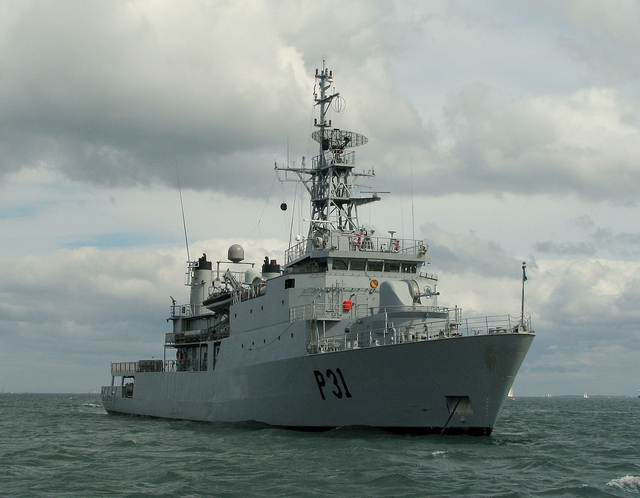
- Eithne during the Belfast Tall Ships event in 2009.

History

Ireland
- Name: LÉ Eithne
- Namesake: Ethniu, a tragic heroine in an early Irish romantic tale
- Builder: Verolme Dockyard, Cork
- Laid down: 15 December 1982
- Launched: 19 December 1983
- Commissioned: 7 December 1984
- Decommissioned: 8 July 2022
- Home port: Haulbowline Naval Base
- Identification: IMO number: 8208141; MMSI number: 250099000; Callsign: EIYS; Hull number: P31
- Fate: Scrapped

General characteristics
- Type: Offshore patrol vessel
- Displacement: 1,920 tonnes (full load)
- Length: 84.8 m (278 ft) overall
- Beam: 12 m (39 ft)
- Draught: 4.3 m (14 ft)
- Speed: 37 km/h (20 kn) maximum
- Complement: 86 (9 officers and 77 ratings)
- Sensors & processing systems: Thales DA05 medium-range surveillance and target indication radar; Plessey PMS-26 sonar; Thales LIOD Mk 1 electro-optical and laser range-finding surveillance and fire-control system; Decca (now Northrop Grumman) TM-1229C and 1692C navigation radars
- Armament: 1× Bofors 57 mm gun; 2× Rheinmetall 20 mm Cannon; 2x M2HB 12.7mm Heavy Machine Gun; 4 mounts for 7.62 mm GPMGs
- Aviation facilities: helicopter flight deck

LÉ Eithne (P31) was a patrol vessel which was previously in service with the Irish Naval Service. The ship was named after Eithne, a tragic heroine and the daughter of the one-eyed Fomorian King, Balor in an early Irish romantic tale. Eithne was the flagship of the Irish Naval Service.

Eithne was originally built as a Helicopter Patrol Vessel (HPV) for long-range fisheries patrol, intended to be at sea for up to 30 days. She was the only ship in her class, as the other planned members of the Eithne-class were never built.

Decommissioned in July 2022 after 38 years with the Irish Naval Service, Eithne embarked on her final voyage to breakers in Ghent, Belgium in June 2024.

== Design ==
Eithne was designed to carry a SA365F Dauphin helicopter, and was the only ship in the Irish Naval Service fleet to have a flight deck. Helicopter operations were limited primarily to the vessel's early years of service. These operations stopped in later years, due in part to the purchase of CASA CN235-100MP Persuader Maritime Patrol Aircraft and decommissioning of the Dauphin helicopters. The vessel was fitted with retractable fin stabilisers to reduce rolling during helicopter operations at sea. She was the only ship in her class, as the other planned members of the Eithne-class were never built.

== Service ==
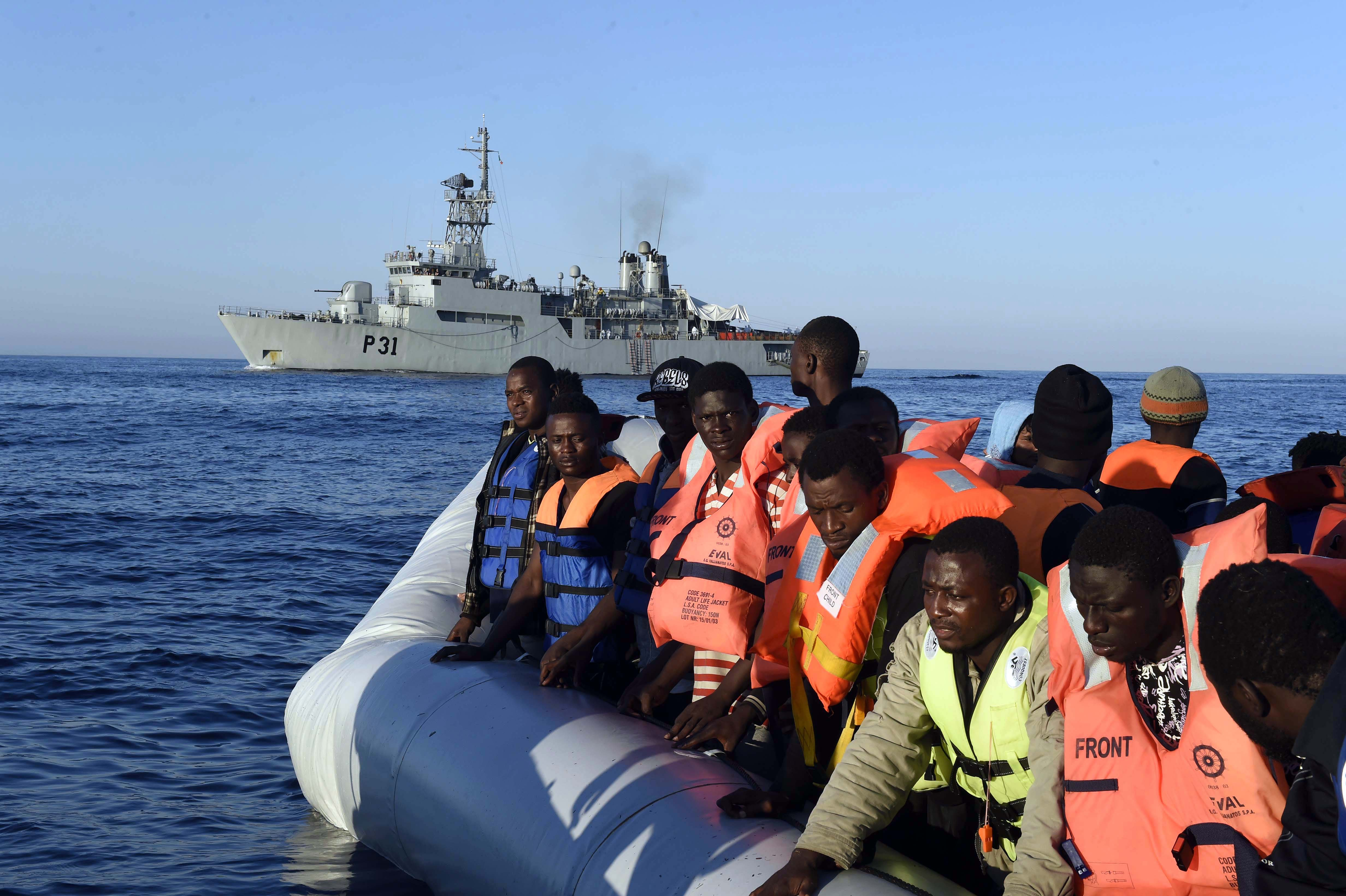
Eithne during her 2015 deployment to the Mediterranean

Eithne was the last ship of the Irish Naval Service to have been built in Ireland, constructed at Verolme Dockyard at Rushbrooke, County Cork and completed in 1984. Shipbuilding operations ceased at the yard in 1984, and the yard went into receivership.

In July 2005 LÉ Eithne represented Ireland at the International Fleet Review at Portsmouth, England.

In April–June 2006 Eithne travelled to Buenos Aires, Argentina, in the first-ever deployment of an Irish ship in the southern hemisphere, in order to participate in commemorations of the impending sesquicentenary of the death of Admiral William Brown who had been born in Ireland. The ship brought back a statue of Brown for display in Dublin.

In 2014, asbestos was found on the ship necessitating a clean-up. Eithne was the third Naval Service vessel found to contain the cancer-causing substance, after asbestos was also found on board LÉ Ciara and LÉ Orla.

In May 2015 Minister of Defence Simon Coveney announced the deployment of Eithne to the Mediterranean as part of the EU's ongoing rescue mission for migrants. Together with other Naval Service vessels, between 2015 and 2017 Eithne undertook a number of deployments in the Mediterranean, rescuing several hundred migrants as part of each mission.

In late 2018, the navigation systems onboard Eithne were upgraded to use a Warship Electronic Chart Display and Information System (WECDIS), reportedly making it the first vessel in the Naval Service fleet to "achieve paperless navigation".

In mid-2019 LÉ Eithne, together with LÉ Orla, was "withdrawn from operations [..] indefinitely due to a lack of personnel". The manner and messaging on the vessel's removal from service caused some controversy, as statements from the Minister of State at the Department of Defence Paul Kehoe (who suggested that the vessel was removed for "routine maintenance") contradicted previous statements made by Flag Officer Commander Mick Malone (who confirmed that the vessel would be tied-up "until adequate numbers of [..] personnel are available").

In March 2020, Eithne was returned to active service and deployed to Cork as part of Ireland's response to the coronavirus pandemic, alongside NSR personnel and Army engineers.

== Decommissioning ==
In July 2022 LÉ Eithne, together with LÉ Ciara and LÉ Orla, was decommissioned, to be replaced with a new multi-role vessel.

Following her decommissioning, Cork County Council requested the transfer of Eithne to the city for preservation as a museum ship. It was also reported, in early 2023, that the Dublin Port company also hoped to use the vessel as a museum ship in Dublin. However, as of late 2023, the vessel was reputedly due to be "broken up for recycled scrap, after plans to convert the HPV into a museum came to nothing" (HPV stands for Helicopter Patrol Vessel).

On 5 March 2024, Eithne was towed from her berth at Haulbowline naval base to Cork Dockyard, formerly Verolme Dockyard (where she was built), to join Cíara and Orla to await disposal.

On 1 June 2024, LÉ Eithne left an Irish port for the last time, bound to Ghent in Belgium to be broken down there.

== See also ==
- Samuel Beckett-class offshore patrol vessel
