= Ferdia (disambiguation) =

Ferdia or Ferdiad is a warrior in Irish mythology. Ferdia may also refer to:

- LÉ Ferdia (A16), ship in the Irish Naval Service
- Ferdia Walsh-Peelo, singer and actor
