= Catch reporting =

Reporting of seafood harvests to a regulatory authority

Catch reporting is a part of Monitoring control and surveillance of Commercial fishing. Depending on national and local fisheries management practices, catch reports may reveal illegal fishing practices, or simply indicate that a given area is being overfished.

== Manual Catch Reporting ==
The general industry practice is to write out a catch report on paper, and present it to a fisheries management official when they return to port. If information does not seem plausible to the official, the report may be verified by physical inspection of the catch. Alternatively, a suspicious vessel may need to carry an independent observer on future voyages.

== Semi-automated Catch Reporting ==
Some Vessel monitoring systems have features that collect, from keyboard input, the data that constitutes a catch report for the entire voyage. More advanced systems periodically transmit the current catch as electronic mail, so fisheries management centers can determine if a controlled area needs to be closed to further fishing.

While there is no standardization as yet for catch reports, a starting point came from a 1981 Conference of Experts:

- Catch on entry to each controlled area
- Weekly catch
- Transshipment
- Port of landing
- Catch on exiting a controlled area
- Days at sea
- Daily time at sea
- Seasonal catch limits
- Per-trip catch limits
- Limits on catch within certain areas
- Individual (vessel) transferable quotas
- Minimum or maximum fish (or shellfish) sizes

This was extended, in 1993, to include: to include the measurement of:

- catch
- species composition
- fishing effort
- Bycatch (i.e., species unintentionally caught, such as dolphins in tuna fishery)
- area of operations

A number of programs require tracking of days at sea (DAS) for a given vessel. They may require tracking the total cumulative catch of a given fishery.

== Major Trends ==
Where the local fishery economy permits, perhaps with international funding, near-real-time catch reporting will become a basic feature of vessel management systems. Software at fisheries management centers will cross-correlate VMS position information, catch reports, and spot inspection reports.

== See also ==
- List of harvested aquatic animals by weight
