= Fisheries Monitoring Centre =

- Airmheán Monatóireachta Iascaigh (AMI)
- Active: 1983 - present
- Country: Ireland
- Branch: Naval Service
- Role: Fisheries protection
- Part of: Defence Forces
- Garrison/HQ: Naval Base Haulbowline, County Cork, Ireland

Insignia
- Abbreviation: FMC

The Fisheries Monitoring Centre (FMC), previously known as the National Supervisory Centre, is a specialised unit within the Irish Naval Service responsible for sea fisheries protection and surveillance of all fishing vessels equipped with a vessel monitoring system. All Irish vessels operating inside and outside of Ireland's exclusive economic zone (EEZ) are monitored by the FMC, as are all internationally registered vessels operating inside the Irish EEZ.

The FMC has responsibility for operating the Irish vessel monitoring system (VMS), an information communications system that tracks vessels via satellite. The FMC is based at Haulbowline in Cork Harbour.

== History ==
The Fisheries Monitoring Centre was originally established as the National Supervisory Centre (NSC) in the mid-1980s. Its introduction was in response to an effort to create a more automated and accurate system for the monitoring of fisheries data. Prior to this data on vessels operating at sea was paper-based. Such data included sightings, boardings, warnings and detention of vessels. The creation of the NSC was therefore created as a single point for the processing of all fisheries activity in the Irish EEZ.

In 1998 a Europe-wide scheme for the installation of transponder boxes in fishing vessels was initiated and with it an effort to modernise fisheries protection in Ireland. With that the NSC became the FMC in 1999.
