= LÉ Orla =

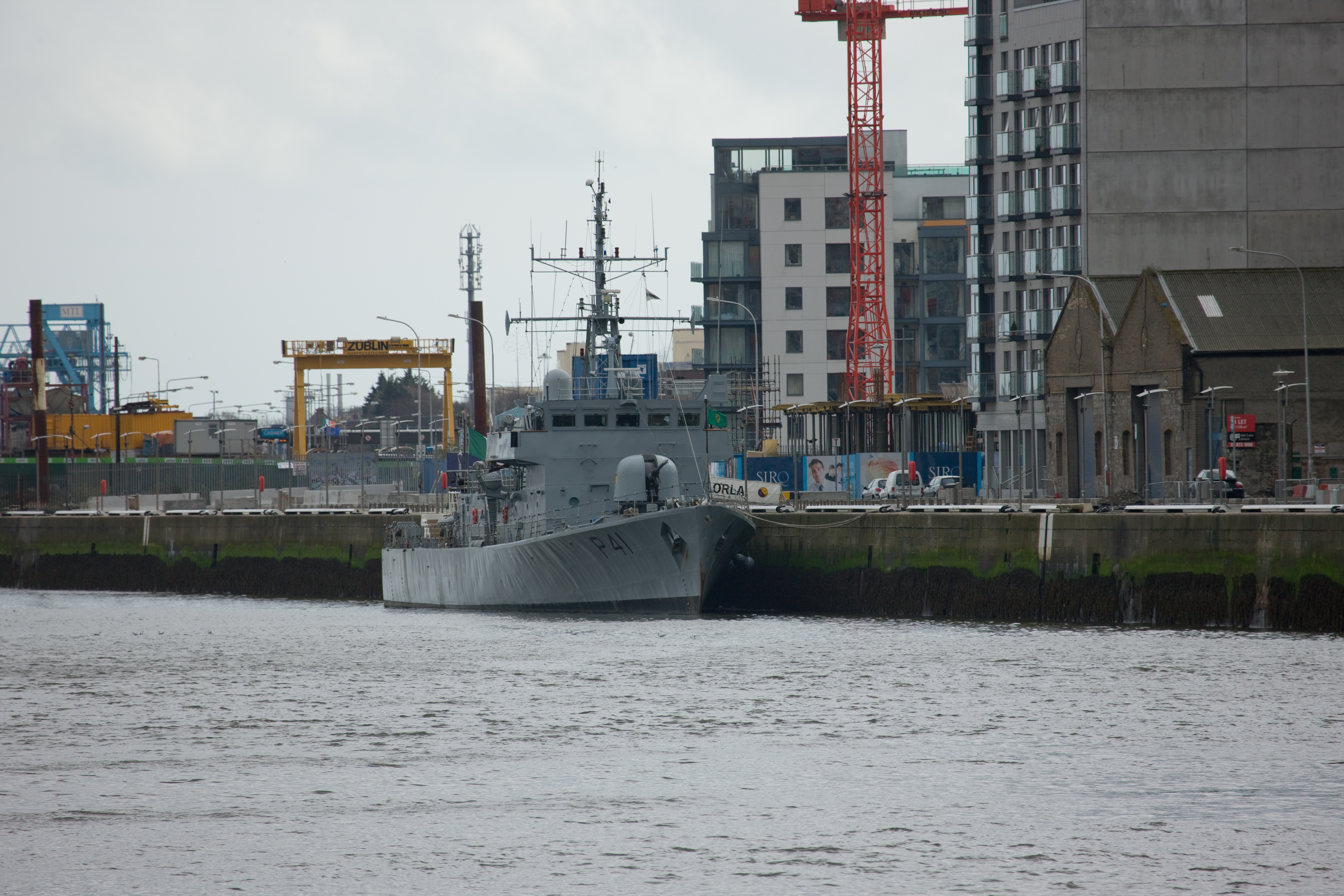
- LÉ Orla in Dublin (2008)

History

Ireland
- Name: LÉ Orla
- Namesake: Orla, a grand niece of Brian Boru
- Builder: Hall Russell
- Cost: £7.4m (1984 pounds)
- Laid down: 1984
- Launched: 1985
- Commissioned: 19 January 1989
- Decommissioned: 8 July 2022
- Home port: Haulbowline Naval Base
- Identification: MMSI number: 250103000; Callsign: EIYQ; Hull number: P41
- Fate: Scrapped

General characteristics
- Class & type: Peacock-class patrol vessel
- Displacement: 712 tonnes full load
- Length: 62.6 m (205 ft)
- Beam: 10 m (33 ft)
- Draught: 2.72 m (8 ft 11 in)
- Propulsion: 2 diesels, 2 shafts, 10,600 kW (14,200 bhp), 1 Schottel 'Loiter Drive' ( ≈180 bhp)
- Speed: 25.0 kn (46.3 km/h)
- Boats & landing craft carried: X2 Avon 5.4 m (18 ft) seariders
- Complement: 39 (6 officers and 33 ratings)
- Armament: 1 × 76 mm OTO Melara Cannon; 2 × Rheinmetall Mk 20 Rh-202autocannon; 4 × 7.62 mm FN MAG GPMG
- Armour: Belted Steel

LÉ Orla (P41) was a Peacock-class patrol vessel in the Irish Naval Service. Like the rest of her class, she was originally designed for use by the British Royal Navy in Hong Kong waters, and was delivered in 1985 by Hall, Russell & Company as HMS Swift (P243).

"Long Éireannach" (LÉ), Irish for "Irish ship", is the designation given to ships in the Irish Naval Service's fleet. The ship was named after Orla, a grand niece (great niece) of Brian Boru who was murdered by her husband around 1090. The crest showed the arms of Clare on the top segment and a sword and royal collar on the base. She was decommissioned, together with her sister ship LÉ Ciara, in 2022.

== Specifications ==
Orla had a displacement of 712 tons fully loaded. The ship was launched in 1984 and purchased by the Irish government in 1988. She was powered by two Crossley Pielstick 18 PA6V 280 diesels rated at 10,000 kW (14,000 hp), providing a top speed of 25 knots (46 km/h; 29 mph) and a range of 4,000 kilometres (2,500 mi) at 17 knots (31 km/h; 20 mph). She carried a crew of 39, including six officers. She was armed with one 76 mm/62 OTO Melara compact gun; two 20 mm Rh202 Rheinmetall autocannons and four 12.7mm heavy machine guns.

== History ==
In November 2008, LÉ Orla assisted in Operation Seabight which resulted in the largest seizure of cocaine in the history of the state of Ireland up to that time.

In mid-2014, LÉ Orla was temporarily kept out of commission to facilitate the removal of asbestos which had been discovered on the ship.

On 8 July 2022, LÉ Orla was decommissioned together with LÉ Ciara and LÉ Eithne.

In April 2024, LÉ Orla was towed together with LÉ Ciara to Belgium to be scrapped.
