= Naval Support Command (Ireland) =

- Country: Ireland
- Branch: Naval Service
- Part of: Defence Forces
- Garrison/HQ: Naval Base Haulbowline

Commanders
- Current commander: Officer Commanding Naval Support Command (OCNSC)

Naval Support Command (NSC) is one of three command components of the Irish Naval Service responsible for supporting all operations of the Naval Service (NS), both on land and at sea. Headed by Officer Commanding Naval Support Command (OCNSC), who reports directly to the head of the Irish Naval Service, Flag Officer Commanding Naval Service (FOCNS), the Naval Support Command oversees the personnel, logistical and technical resources of the NS, allowing the service to meets its operational and training commitments. As part of NSC there are four departments within that provide various support services.

== Support Command HQ ==
Naval Support Command is overseen by Support Command HQ, where support sections provide assistance to the OCNSC.

=== Personnel Management Section (PMS) ===
PMS provides for all personnel matters, including regulations, formulation of policy regarding job opportunities and integration of females into the NS. PMS also provides for recruitment, maintenance of records, pay, welfare and career advancement of service personnel.

=== Maintenance Management Section ===
Supervises and records the technical maintenance of all Naval Service assets.

=== Planning and Inspectorate ===
Responsible for all new NS constructions such as vessels as well as planning for future needs. The inspectorate element ensures all work and upgrades of the NS meet the highest technical standards laid down by the Defence Forces.

== Mechanical Engineering and Naval Dockyard Unit ==
=== Plant and Machinery Section ===
Provides technical support for Naval Service vessels and other assets.

=== Naval Dockyard Section ===
Provides heavy engineering maintenance of Naval Service vessels when they're back at base in Haulbowline.

== Base Logistical Department ==
The Base Logistical Department provides for planning and logistical support of all NS activities, both at sea and on land. As part of this department there are a number of sub-sections.

=== Naval Technical Stores ===
Responsible for administration of store procurement, including naval contracts as well as the maintenance of stores inventory such as ship fuel.

=== Central Supply Unit ===
Responsible for procurement of provisions, the maintenance of provision and ordnance stores as well as clothing stores.

=== Accommodation and Messes Section ===
Responsible for providing accommodation of personnel both at sea and on land. Caters for mess and dining provisions, including food. Utilities and base laundry fall under this support section.

=== Base Engineering Maintenance Section ===
Maintains base utilities, plans the construction of base buildings and performs repairs of current base structures. The Base Engineering and Maintenance Section plans and controls the naval part of the Defence Forces engineering budget.

=== Road Transport Section ===
Provides transportation services for naval activities onshore.

== Weapons Electrical Unit ==
=== Communications Technical Section ===
Provides maintenance work for communication and navigational equipment being used by the Naval Service.

=== Electrical/Electronics Section ===
Provides for the maintenance of all power generation on ships as well as at Naval Base Haulbowline.

=== Ordnance Section ===
Provides maintenance on all small arms as well as the weapons systems on Naval Service vessels.

== See also ==
Military logistics
