= LÉ Ciara =

1984 Peacock-class corvette

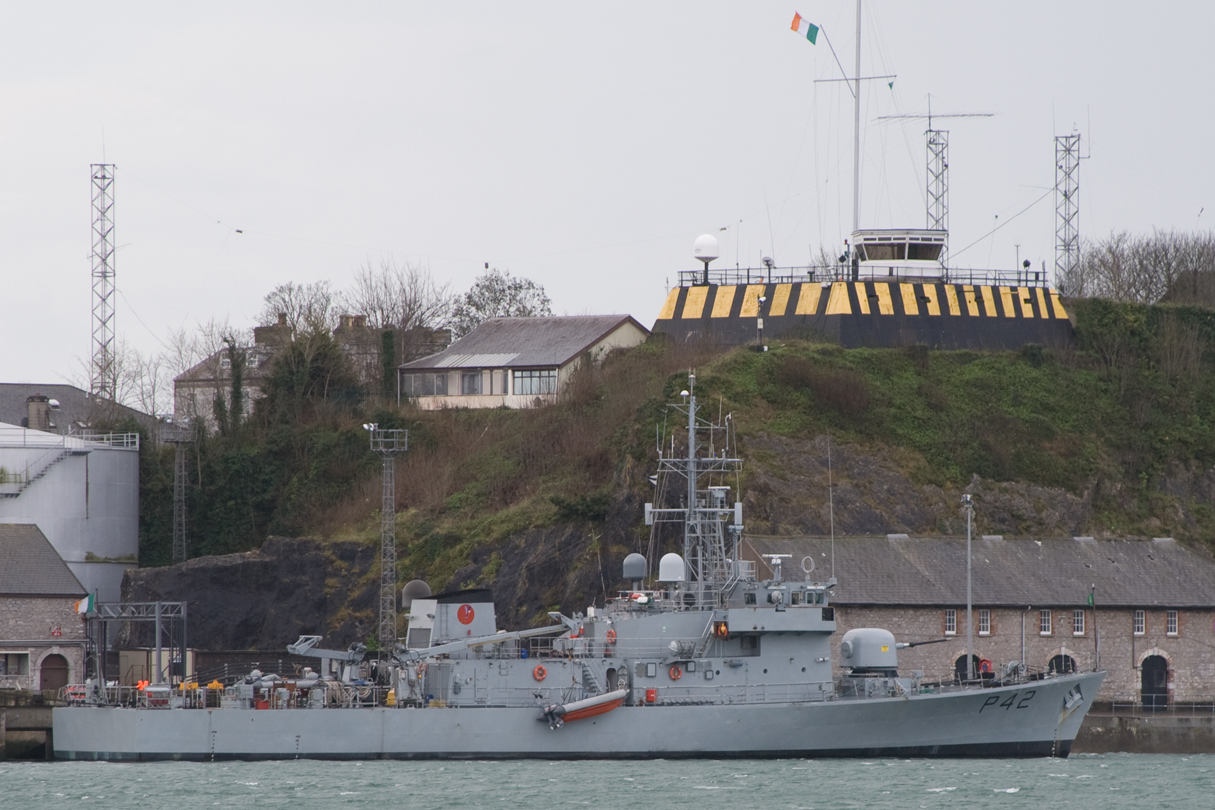
- Ciara at Haulbowline in March 2008

History

United Kingdom
- Name: HMS Swallow
- Builder: Hall Russell
- Yard number: 991
- Launched: 30 March 1984
- Completed: 17 October 1984
- Identification: Pennant number: P242
- Fate: Sold to Irish Naval Service 1988

Ireland
- Name: LÉ Ciara
- Namesake: Saint Ciara
- Acquired: 1988
- Commissioned: 16 January 1989
- Decommissioned: 8 July 2022
- Home port: Haulbowline Naval Base
- Identification: IMO number: 8119326; MMSI number: 250104000; Callsign: EIYT; Hull number: P42
- Nickname(s): "Road Runner"
- Fate: Scrapped

General characteristics
- Type: Peacock-class patrol vessel
- Displacement: 712 tonnes full load
- Length: 62.6 m (205 ft)
- Beam: 10 m (33 ft)
- Draught: 2.72 m (8 ft 11 in)
- Propulsion: 2 diesels, 2 shafts, 10,600 kW (14,200 bhp)
- Speed: 46.3 km/h (25.0 kn), cruising; 55.6 km/h (30.0 kn), sprint
- Boats & landing craft carried: X2 Avon 5.4 m (18 ft) seariders
- Complement: 39 (6 officers and 33 ratings)
- Armament: 1 × 76 mm OTO Melara Cannon; 2 × Rh202 Rheinmetall 20 mm; 2 × 12.7 mm GPMG
- Armour: Belted Steel

LÉ Ciara (P42) was a Peacock-class patrol vessel in the Irish Naval Service. Like the rest of her class, she was originally designed for use by the British Royal Navy in Hong Kong waters, and was delivered in 1984 by Hall, Russell & Company as HMS Swallow (P242). The ship was passed to the Irish Naval Service in 1988 and was commissioned as LÉ Ciara by the then Taoiseach Charles Haughey on 16 January 1989. She was decommissioned, together with her sister ship Orla, in 2022.

== Royal Navy service ==
The ship was built as HMS Swallow with the yard number of 991 at the Aberdeen yard of Hall Russell. She was launched on 30 March 1984 and completed on 17 October 1984. In 1988 she was sold to Ireland and renamed LÉ Ciara.

== Etymology ==
In Irish service, the ship took her name from Saint Ciara, born in Tipperary in the 7th century who, after taking religious vows in her teens, founded a convent in Kilkeary, near Nenagh. The ship's coat-of-arms depicted three golden chalices which represent the three ancient dioceses among which Tipperary was divided. Also featured was a Celtic cross as a representation of the North Cross at Ahenny, County Tipperary. The coat of arms incorporated the Tipperary colours of Blue and Yellow as well as the background or field colours of the Tipperary Arms which is Ermine - white with a pattern of black arrowhead shaped points.

== Weapons and equipment ==
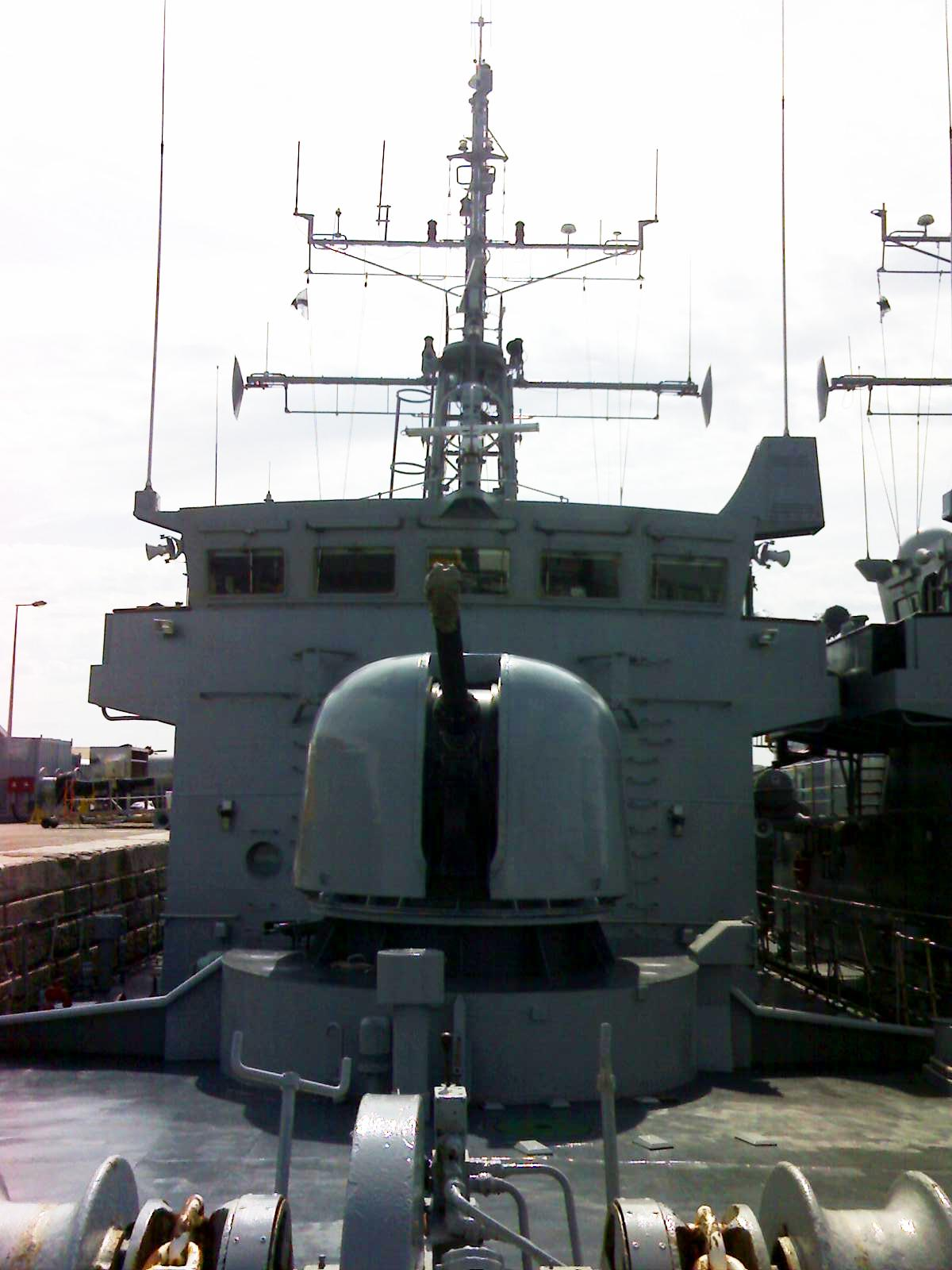
Command bridge and 76 mm gun of Ciara

The ship's principal armament was an OTO Melara 76 mm Compact gun. It had a 20-kilometre (12 mi) range and could fire 85 rounds per minute. It could be used in both anti-aircraft and anti-ship roles. It held an 80-round magazine that could easily be reloaded by a two-man team. There were also two single 20 mm Rh202 Rheinmetall autocannons and two 12.7 mm machine guns.

She was equipped with surveillance equipment and a fishery protection information system which was regularly updated via a satellite link to the Irish Naval Service base at Haulbowline Island near Cobh.

Ciara had a cruising speed of 25 knots (46 km/h; 29 mph) and a sprint speed of 30 knots (56 km/h; 35 mph), making her the fastest ship in the Irish Navy; the crew have nicknamed her "Road Runner" after the speedy cartoon character, which was portrayed on the funnel.

== History ==
Throughout her career, LÉ Ciara was involved in fisheries protection patrols as well as search and rescue missions.

In 2011, the vessel was temporarily taken out of service to address an issue with the hull, and was again kept out of commission for several months in mid-2014 for removal of asbestos.

On 8 July 2022, LÉ Ciara was decommissioned together with LÉ Orla and LÉ Eithne.

In April 2024, LÉ Ciara was towed together with LÉ Orla to Belgium to be scrapped.
