= Irish Naval Service =

Maritime service branch of the Irish Defence Forces

Naval Service
- An tSeirbhís Chabhlaigh (Irish)
- Emblem of the Naval Service
- Founded: 1 September 1946
- Country: Ireland
- Type: Navy
- Role: Defence of the state and protection of its maritime resources
- Size: 855 active personnel (Establishment: 1,094) (May 2026); 77 reservists (Establishment: 200) (Apr 2023); 8 ships (4 available for operations as of March 2025)
- Part of: Irish Defence Forces
- Naval base: Haulbowline, County Cork, Ireland
- Colours
- Website: www.military.ie/en/who-we-are/naval-service/

Commanders
- Flag Officer Commanding Naval Service (FOCNS): Commodore Darragh Kirwan

Insignia
- Naval ensign

- Naval jack

The Naval Service (Irish: An tSeirbhís Chabhlaigh) is the maritime component of the Defence Forces of Ireland and is one of the three branches of the Irish Defence Forces. Its base is in Haulbowline, County Cork.

Though preceded by earlier maritime defence organisations, the Naval Service was formed in 1946. Since the 1970s a major role of the Naval Service has been the provision of fisheries protection in Ireland's exclusive economic zone (EEZ). Other roles include sea patrol, surveillance, and smuggling prevention. Occasionally the service undertakes longer missions in support of other elements of the Defence Forces, Irish peacekeepers serving with the United Nations, or humanitarian and trade missions.

The Naval Service has an active establishment of 1,094 and a reserve establishment of 200. Like other components of the Defence Forces, the Naval Service has struggled to maintain strength and as of late 2024 had only 719 active personnel, and 77 reserve personnel. As of 2026, the Naval Service had 855 active personnel from the established strength of 1,094.

The international ship prefix for Naval Service vessels is LÉ or Long Éireannach (Irish Ship). Naval Service ships are traditionally named with mainly female names taken from Celtic mythology and Irish folklore. In 2014, the government controversially broke from tradition and decided to name the new P60 class ships after famous Irish writers, but in 2024, the traditional naming conventions was restored with the naming of the P70 class patrol vessels.

== History ==
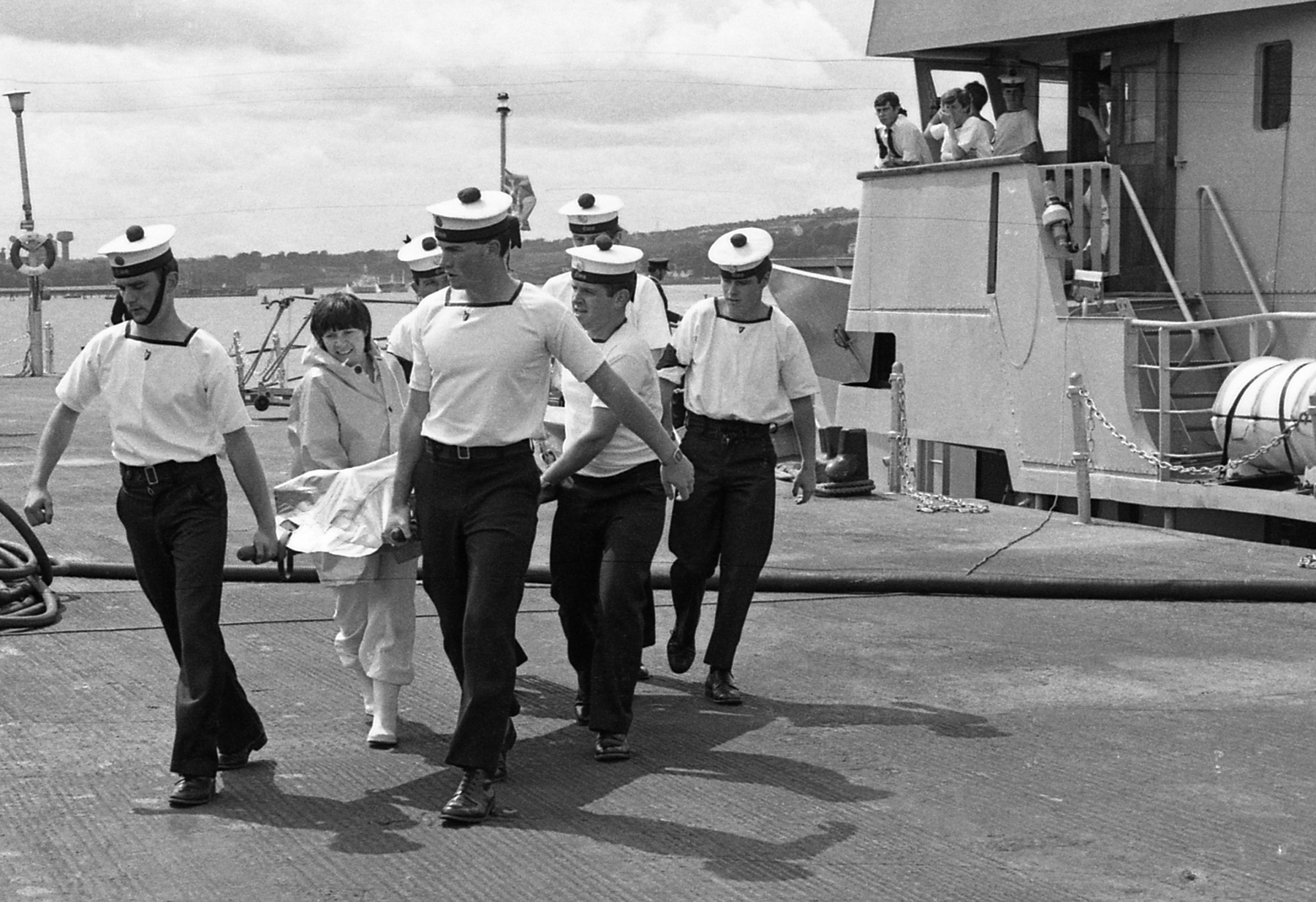
Naval Service personnel remove the body of a victim of Air India Flight 182 from LÉ Aisling which was sent to search for survivors on 23 June 1985

=== Coastal and Marine Service ===
The Anglo-Irish Treaty of 1921, which created the Irish Free State, stipulated that it was to be given responsibility to police its customs and fishing, while control of its seas remained with the United Kingdom and its Royal Navy, who also retained the "Treaty Ports" of Cork, Berehaven and Lough Swilly.

During the Irish Civil War, due to the lack of an established navy for the Irish Free State, the Royal Navy provided some support, patrolling and searching incoming ships to prevent gun-running to the Irish Republican Army. Actually backing the Free State in combat was considered, but never implemented, as British military intervention would have been politically-embarrassing for the new Irish government. Anti-Treaty IRA units occasionally fired on Royal Navy vessels, though these efforts were ineffective.

Several coastal landings were undertaken by the Irish National Army using commandeered civilian passenger ships such as the TSS Arvonia and the SS Lady Wicklow. On 2 August 1922, the Lady Wicklow, commanded by Captain Patrick Ryan, landed 450 troops under the infamous Paddy Daly at Fenit, the port of Tralee. On 8 August, the Arvonia and Lady Wicklow were used to land over 1,000 troops at Youghal and Passage West liberating Cork unopposed two days later.

In May 1923, Major General Joseph Vize, a colleague of Michael Collins, established the Coastal and Marine Service (CMS) with fourteen patrol vessels, each armed with a 12 pounder gun, and several other boats armed with machine guns. As the civil war concluded the same month, the vessels were soon disposed of, and the service was disbanded in March 1924.

=== Inter-war years ===
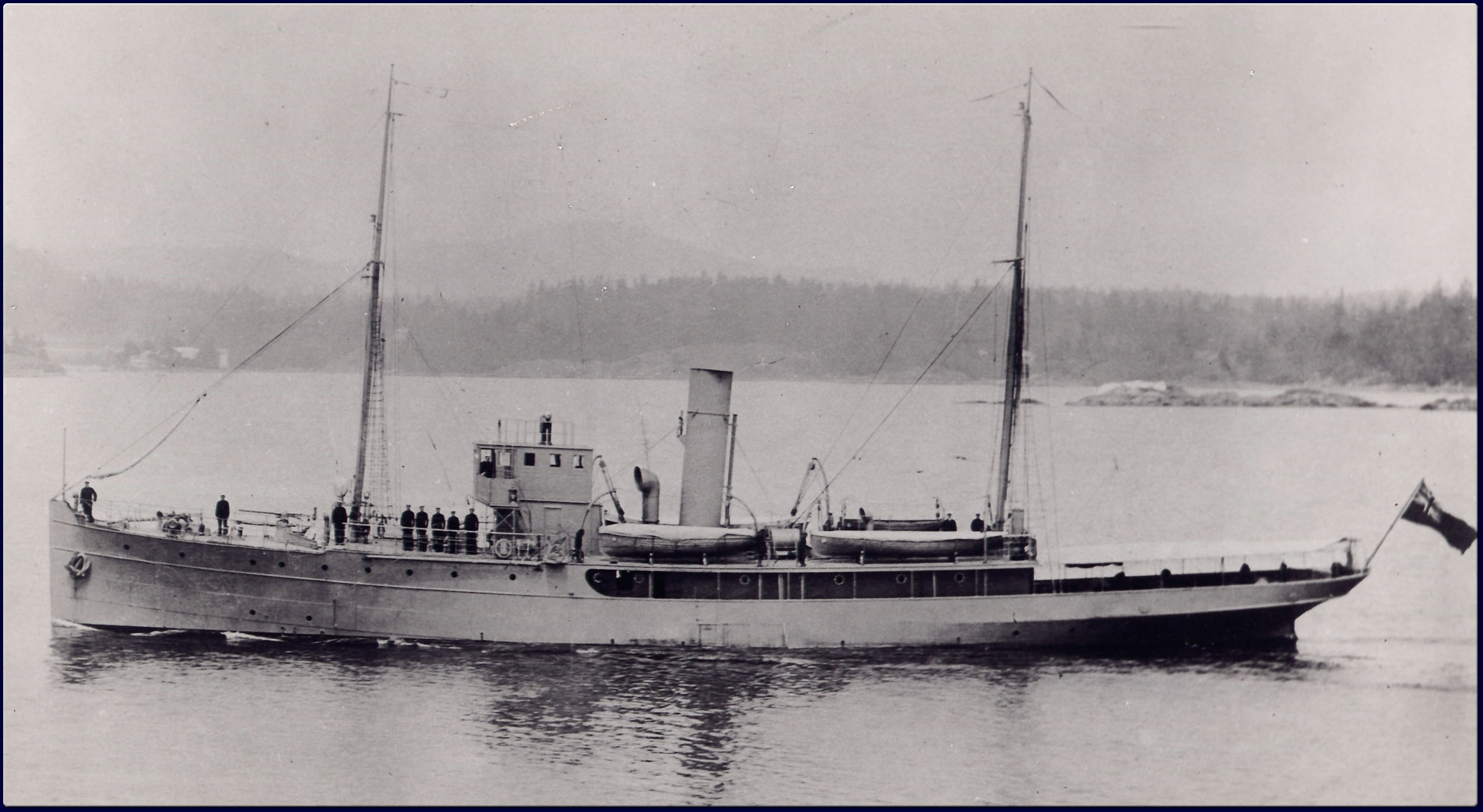
HMCS Malaspina of the same design as the Muirchu

From 1924 to 1938, Ireland had very little interest in maritime affairs. Its only ship was the unarmed Muirchú, which was operated by the Department of Agriculture and Fisheries to patrol Irish fisheries. By the late 1930s, the Free State began to pay a little more notice and the Muirchú was re-armed in 1936. She was joined in 1938 by the newly built steam trawler Fort Rannoch. Also in 1938, the Anglo-Irish Trade Agreement returned the Treaty Ports to Ireland, and the Royal Navy withdrew from Cork Harbour.

=== The Emergency – Marine and Coastwatching Service ===
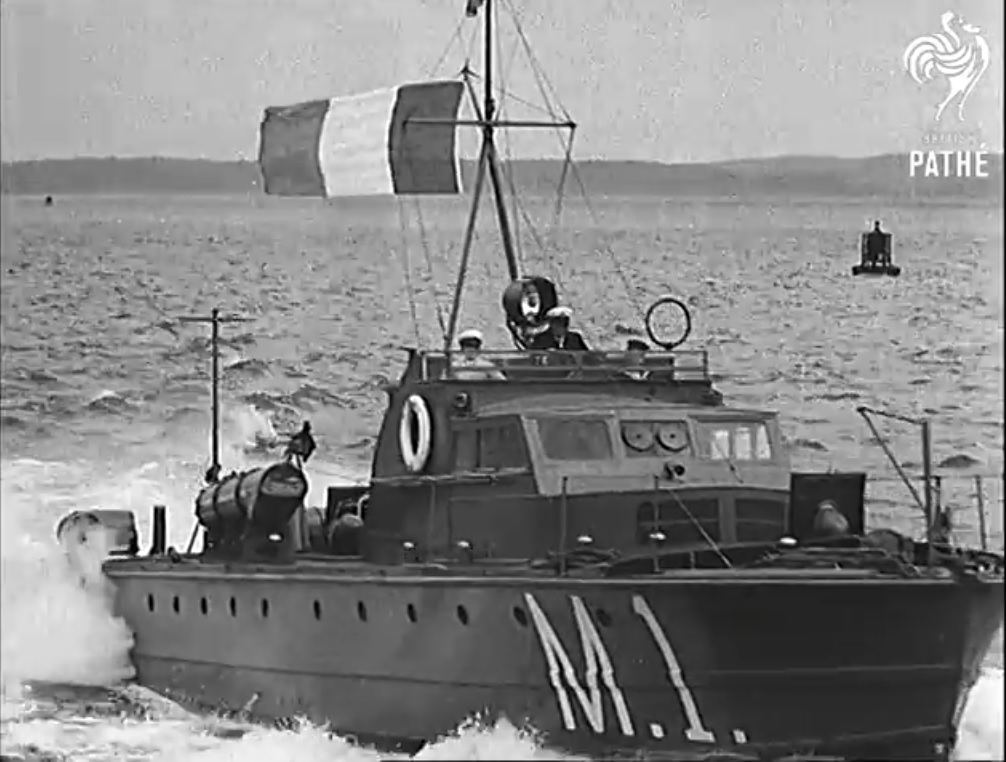
M1 Irish motor torpedo boat

On the outbreak of World War Two in September 1939, referred to as The Emergency in Ireland, the government established the Marine and Coastwatching Service, later renamed the Marine Service in 1942. That May the government had ordered two motor torpedo boats (MTBs) from Vosper Thorneycroft. In order to present a more credible neutrality the government ordered an additional four boats later that year. In June 1940, one of the MTBs was involved in a serious breach of Irish neutrality, when the crew who were in Southampton to collect the boat decided to assist in evacuating Allied soldiers during the Dunkirk evacuation. A naval reserve, the Maritime Inscription, was established with over 1,000 men in twelve companies to provide port security. The closed Royal Navy base at Haulbowline in Cork harbour was re-opened in 1940 to serve as the base for the Service. By 1941, the Service had about 300 all ranks, with the six MTBs joined by the Muirchú, Fort Rannock, the minelayer Shark, and sail training vessel Isaalt. During the Emergency, these ships served as Ireland's navy, regulating merchant ships, protecting fisheries, and laying mines in Cork and Waterford harbours.

=== Cold War – Naval Service ===
==== 1946–1971 ====
In September 1946, the Marine Service was incorporated into the Irish Defence Forces as the Naval Service. The first formal training of Irish Naval Cadets took place at the Britannia Royal Naval College, Dartmouth, UK in 1947. In June 1947, the Maritime Inscription was reorganised as An Slua Muirí. The government intended to purchase six corvettes for the fledgling navy, but ultimately only three Flower-class corvettes were purchased from the United Kingdom in 1946 and 1947. The tradition of naming Irish Naval Ships after figures in Celtic mythology was started, and the ships were named LÉ Macha, LÉ Maev, and LÉ Cliona. These three corvettes were Naval Service's only ships during the 1950s and 1960s with their main role being fishery protection. The corvettes were withdrawn from service between 1970-72 and scrapped soon afterwards. In 1971, the Naval Service acquired three Ton-class minesweepers: LÉ Grainne, LÉ Banba and LÉ Fola.

==== 1971–1989 ====
The 1970s was a time of expansion for the Naval Service as several locally built ships were added to the fleet. In 1971, the Naval Service commissioned Verolme Cork Dockyard to build an offshore patrol ship. Named LÉ Deirdre, it was the first naval vessel purpose-built in Ireland to patrol its waters.

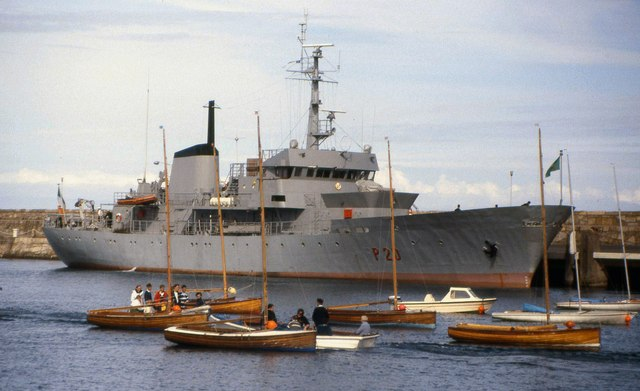
LÉ Deirdre, the first purpose-built ship commissioned by the Irish Naval Service

Since independence, Ireland's territorial waters were limited to 3 nautical miles (5.6 km). In 1964, her territorial waters were extended to 12 nautical miles (22 km) increasing her maritime area to 41,000 km^{2} (16,000 sq mi). In 1976, Ireland's exclusive economic zone was extended out to 200 nautical miles (370 km), increasing her maritime area to 450,000 km^{2} (170,000 sq mi). The increased maritime area required additional patrol vessels, and Ireland was granted funding from the European Economic Community to increase the Naval Service fleet. Between 1977 to 1982 inclusive, Ireland received IR£31 million from the EEC to purchase ships and aircraft for fishery protection.

LÉ Deirdre was the prototype for three further offshore patrol vessels built by Verolme, which were LÉ Emer (1978), LÉ Aoife (1979), and LÉ Aisling (1980).

In 1980, the government planned to acquire two helicopter carriers from Verolme. However, due to design delays the first ship was not ordered until April 1982 with delivery expected twenty four months later. LÉ Eithne entered service in December 1984, and two Dauphin helicopters were acquired to operate with her. In 1986, LÉ Eithne became the first Irish naval ship to cross the Atlantic. The closure of the Verolme dockyard in 1984 due to poor management and low worker productivity prevented the sister ship to Eithne being ordered.

Meanwhile, Isolda was acquired in 1977 from the Commissioners of Irish Lights. Renamed LÉ Setanta (A15), she served as a training ship until 1984. A Danish stern trawler Helen Basse was leased for a year in 1977 as the LÉ Ferdia (A16). By the 1980s, the three minesweepers were showing their age and were withdrawn from service by 1987. As replacements, in 1988 the government purchased two Peacock-class patrol vessels from the Royal Navy's Hong Kong Squadron, which were renamed LÉ Orla and LÉ Ciara.

=== Into the 21st century ===
The 50th anniversary of the Irish Naval Service took place in 1996, which included a fleet review by President Mary Robinson.

In the late 1990s, the government commissioned Appledore Shipbuilders to construct a new class of larger patrol vessels. In December 1999, LÉ Róisín was delivered to the Naval Service, followed in September 2001 by LÉ Niamh. LÉ Deirdre was decommissioned the same year. On 1 October 2005, An Slua Muirí was reorganised into the Naval Service Reserve.

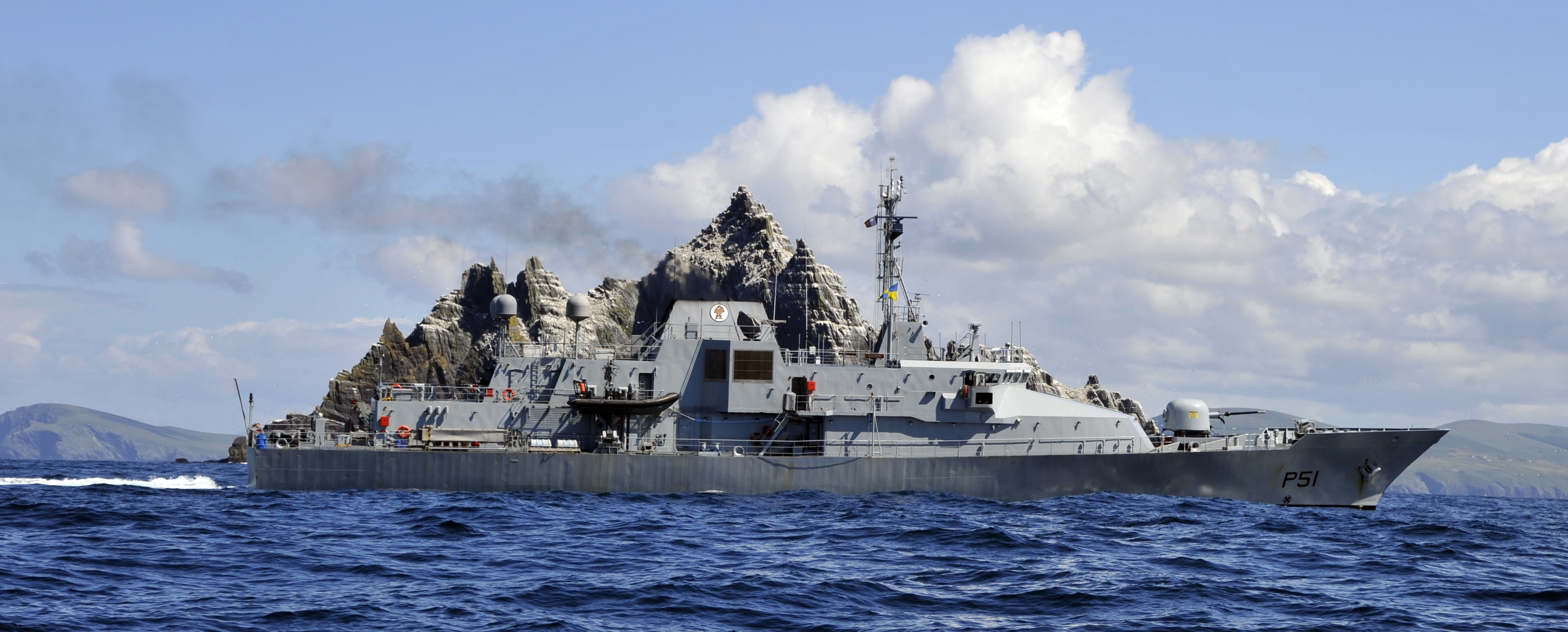
LÉ Róisín cruising off the Skellig Islands in 2013

In 2010, Appledore was again commissioned to construct two new patrol vessels to VARD Marine's PV90 design. The new ships were 12m longer than the Róisín class patrol vessels, allowing for a longer deck area to accommodate unmanned submersibles, a diving chamber, or UAVs. In a very controversial decision, the government broke from tradition and decided to name the new ships after Irish writers. The first, LÉ Samuel Beckett, was delivered in April 2014 replacing the decommissioned LÉ Emer. The second, LÉ James Joyce arrived in September 2015 to replace the decommissioned LÉ Aoife. The option for a third, LÉ William Butler Yeats, was exercised in June 2014 and commissioned in October 2016 to replace the LÉ Aisling. A fourth, LÉ George Bernard Shaw, was also ordered and entered service in October 2018.

While Naval Service ships typically operate in Irish waters, they have provided resupply missions to Irish peacekeepers in Lebanon, Cyprus, the Balkans, Eritrea and Liberia. In 2002, LÉ Niamh travelled to the far east in a trade mission, visiting India, Malaysia, Singapore, Hong Kong, China, Korea, and Japan, resupplying Irish peacekeepers in Eritrea enroute. During the cruise, she became the first Irish naval ship to transit the Suez Canal and cross the Equator. In 2006, LÉ Eithne travelled to Argentina to attend commemorations of Irish-born Admiral William Brown, founder of the Argentine Navy, in the first-ever deployment of an Irish naval ship to the southern hemisphere. She also visited ports in Uruguay and Brazil, and brought back a statue of Brown which is erected on Sir John Rogerson's Quay, Dublin. In 2010, LÉ Niamh travelled to Latin America attend bicentenary independence celebrations in a trade and diplomatic mission. During her trip she visited Brazil, Argentina, Chile, Mexico and the United States, and became the first Irish naval ship to transit the Straits of Magellan and the Panama Canal, and the first to sail in the Pacific Ocean.

From 2015 to 2018, the Naval Service deployed a ship eleven times to the Mediterranean to provide humanitarian assistance because of the European migrant crisis, firstly in a bilateral agreement with Italy under Operation Pontus, and latterly with the European Union's Operation Sophia, rescuing over 18,000 illegal migrants. Participation in Operation Sophia was controversial as it required approval by the so-called "triple lock" process. The Naval Service's participation ended due to a shortage of operational ships as one third of fleet were in refit or maintenance, and there were insufficient numbers of technical and specialist personnel.

In March 2022, the government announced the purchase of two retired RNZN inshore patrol vessels. The government statement also announced the withdrawal of the LÉ Orla, LÉ Ciara and LÉ Eithne from service, which were later decommissioned in July. The loss of LÉ Eithne represented a serious degradation in the service's operational capability given she was the only ship that was capable of operating a helicopter and had onboard sonar capabilities. The two new inshore patrol vessels, LÉ Aoibhinn and LÉ Gobnait, were commissioned into service in September 2024. Due to their small size, the two ships are intended to be used for fishery protection patrols in the Irish Sea, and based in an east coast base.

==== "Manpower crisis" ====
The decommissioning of three ships did not resolve the growing "manpower crisis" in the Naval Service, as in January 2023 LÉ Róisín and LÉ Niamh, one third of the fleet, were placed into operational reserve. Later that year, two additional ships, LÉ James Joyce and LÉ George Bernard Shaw, were also placed into reserve, leaving only two ships available for patrols. In July 2024, the Naval Service operated a "three-ship operational posture", with the four P60 class vessels on patrol in operational rotation (two operational and one standby), while the two P50 vessels were under refit or in reserve. In January 2025, due to only having one naval ordnance technician left, the LÉ George Bernard Shaw had to go to sea with its main armament, OTO Melara 76mm, non-functional. The reduced operational capability of the Naval Service has meant that the number of patrol days has halved between 2020 and 2024 to 428 days.

== Organisation ==
=== Naval Headquarters ===
The Naval Service is headed by Flag Officer Commanding the Naval Service (FOCNS) Commodore Darragh Kirwan who is based at Naval Headquarters (NHQ) in Naval Base Haulbowline. NHQ oversees all aspects of the Naval Service, with a number of commands under it: Naval Operations Command (NOC) and Naval Support Command (NSC). The Naval College, like the DFTC is of an equal footing with the two commands, with all three headed by an officer commanding who report directly to the FOCNS of NHQ.

=== Naval Operations Command ===
Naval Operations Command is the principal command component of the Irish Naval Service responsible for all day-to-day activities of the service, both at sea and on shore. One of three major command components of the NS this command is responsible for overseeing the work and mission objectives of all Irish naval vessels at sea who report directly to Naval Operations Command at Naval Base Haulbowline. The command is a direct subordinate to NHQ and is overseen by Officer Commanding Naval Operations Command (OCNOC). The OCNOC reports directly to the head of the Irish Naval Service, the FOCNS.

=== Naval Support Command ===
Naval Support Command oversees the personnel, logistical and technical resources of the NS, allowing the service to meet its operational and training commitments. Ship procurement, maintenance, repair, provisions, ordnance, food, fuel, personnel and transportation are handled by Naval Support Command. Naval Support Command is headed by Officer Commanding Naval Support Command and reports directly to the FOCNS.

=== Naval College ===
The Naval College is the principal naval military college in Ireland providing training to cadets, NCOs and recruits of the Irish Naval Service. The Naval College trains and educates personnel for service, providing a mixture of different courses ranging from officer training right through to naval engineering. The Naval College is based out of the Naval Service's headquarters at Naval Base Haulbowline but also provides classes and lessons in non-military naval training at the nearby National Maritime College of Ireland (NMCI) in Ringaskiddy.

The Naval College contains a number of schools providing specialist courses including the Officer Training School, the Military and Naval Operational Training School and the School of Naval Engineering. The Officer Commanding Naval College reports directly to the FOCNS.

=== Naval Service Reserve ===
The Naval Service Reserve is the part-time, volunteer reserve force of the Naval Service, with an established strength of 200 personnel. The Reserve provides port security and supplements the crews of Naval Service vessels. As of 2021, four new motor launches had been ordered for the NSR, to be built by FM Marine Services. The first of these vessels, named Fionnghuala and launched in December 2024, was the first naval vessel built in Ireland since the LÉ Eithne in 1984.

=== Specialist units ===
The Naval Service has a number of specialist units that handle unique and varied tasks within the service.

==== Diving Section ====
Members of the Naval Service Diving Section

The Naval Service Diving Section (NSDS) (Irish: Rannóg Tumadóireachta na Seirbháse Cabhlaigh), formally part of NOC's shore operations section, is a specialist unit of the Irish Naval Service, a branch of the Defence Forces, the military of Ireland. The Naval Service Diving Section specialises in underwater diving tasks for the Naval Service, and since its formation in 1964 has become Ireland's most advanced diving team, aiding other state agencies in various specialist roles.

Various mission roles of the NSDS include search and recovery, underwater survey, explosive ordnance disposal (EOD) underwater engineering and military diving training. They have conducted combat diving training for Army Ranger Wing members after selecting combat diving as a speciality.

==== Naval Intelligence Cell ====
The Naval Intelligence Cell, part of the NOC's Intelligence and Fisheries Section, is responsible for the collection, collation and dissemination of naval intelligence and is the naval component of the Defence Forces' Directorate of Military Intelligence.

==== Fishery Monitoring Centre ====
The Fishery Monitoring Centre, part of the NOC's Intelligence and Fisheries Section, oversees the identification, monitoring and surveillance of fisheries vessels in Irish waters as part of the Vessel Monitoring System. The Fishery Monitoring Centre coordinates with fisheries agencies in other countries.

== Roles and capabilities ==
The Naval Service's military roles and the functions it carries out are more those of a coast guard rather than that of a conventional navy. Lacking both anti-submarine and anti-aircraft capabilities, and without standoff weapons such as surface-to-surface missiles, the Naval Service's ability to control Ireland's territorial waters and provide close naval support is extremely limited. Sea lift is also limited and ad hoc. The Naval Service's non-military capabilities in aid to the civil power and other government departments is fishery protection, search and rescue, drugs interdiction and dive support.

As of 2026, the army-technology.com stated that "due to Ireland's current military deficiencies, the country de facto relies on the UK for national defence", and in particular "The Royal Navy would be required to deter an incursion by hostile surface vessels and submarines."

== Equipment ==
As of September 2024, the Naval Service fleet included four offshore patrol vessels (OPVs), two large patrol vessels (LPVs), and two inshore patrol vessels (IPVs).

=== Ships ===
Main Articles: List of current vessels of the Naval Service and List of decommissioned vessels of the Naval Service

| Name | Image | Type | No. | Comm. | Displacement | Length | Notes |
Patrol vessels
| LÉ Samuel Beckett | LÉ Samuel Beckett (P61) | Samuel Beckett-class offshore patrol vessel (OPV) | P61 | 2014 | 2,256 t | 90 m | Three P60s on operational rotation as of November 2025 |
| LÉ James Joyce | LÉ Samuel Beckett (P61) | Samuel Beckett-class offshore patrol vessel (OPV) | P62 | 2015 | 2,256 t | 90 m | Three P60s on operational rotation as of November 2025 |
| LÉ William Butler Yeats | LÉ Samuel Beckett (P61) | Samuel Beckett-class offshore patrol vessel (OPV) | P63 | 2016 | 2,256 t | 90 m | Three P60s on operational rotation as of November 2025 |
| LÉ George Bernard Shaw | LÉ Samuel Beckett (P61) | Samuel Beckett-class offshore patrol vessel (OPV) | P64 | 2019 | 2,256 t | 90 m | Three P60s on operational rotation as of November 2025 |
| LÉ Róisín | LÉ Niamh (P52) | Róisín-class large patrol vessel (LPV) | P51 | 1999 | 1,500 t | 78.84 m | In reserve as of November 2025. |
| LÉ Niamh | LÉ Niamh (P52) | Róisín-class large patrol vessel (LPV) | P52 | 2001 | 1,500 t | 78.84 m | In reserve as of November 2025. |
| LÉ Aoibhinn | LÉ Aoibhinn (P71) | Lake-class inshore patrol vessel (IPV) | P71 | 2024 | 340 t | 55 m | Operational as of November 2025 in rotation with P60s |
| LÉ Gobnait | LÉ Aoibhinn (P71) | Lake-class inshore patrol vessel (IPV) | P72 | 2024 | 340 t | 55 m | Not operational |

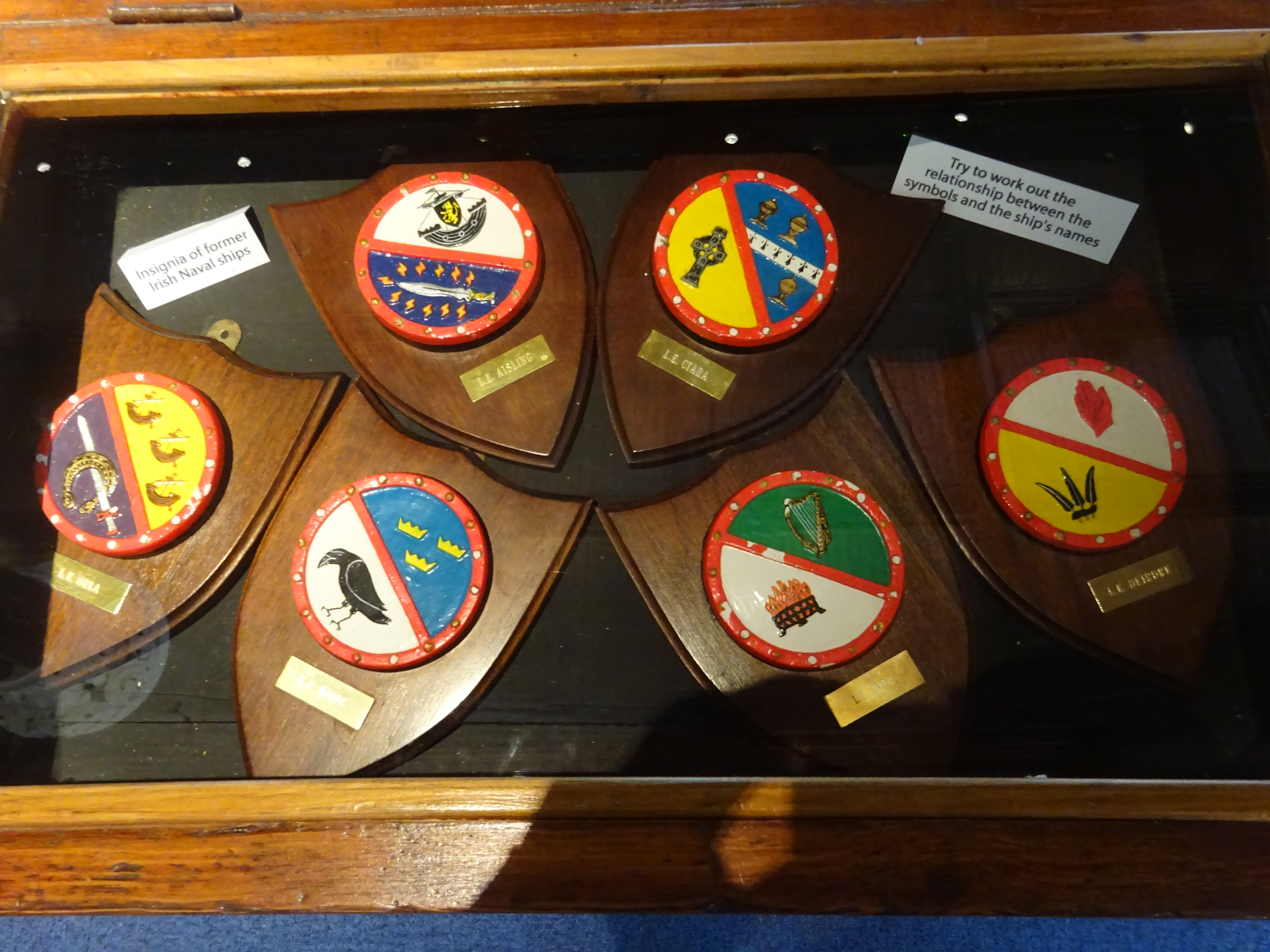
Badges of various decommissioned INS ships, National Maritime Museum of Ireland

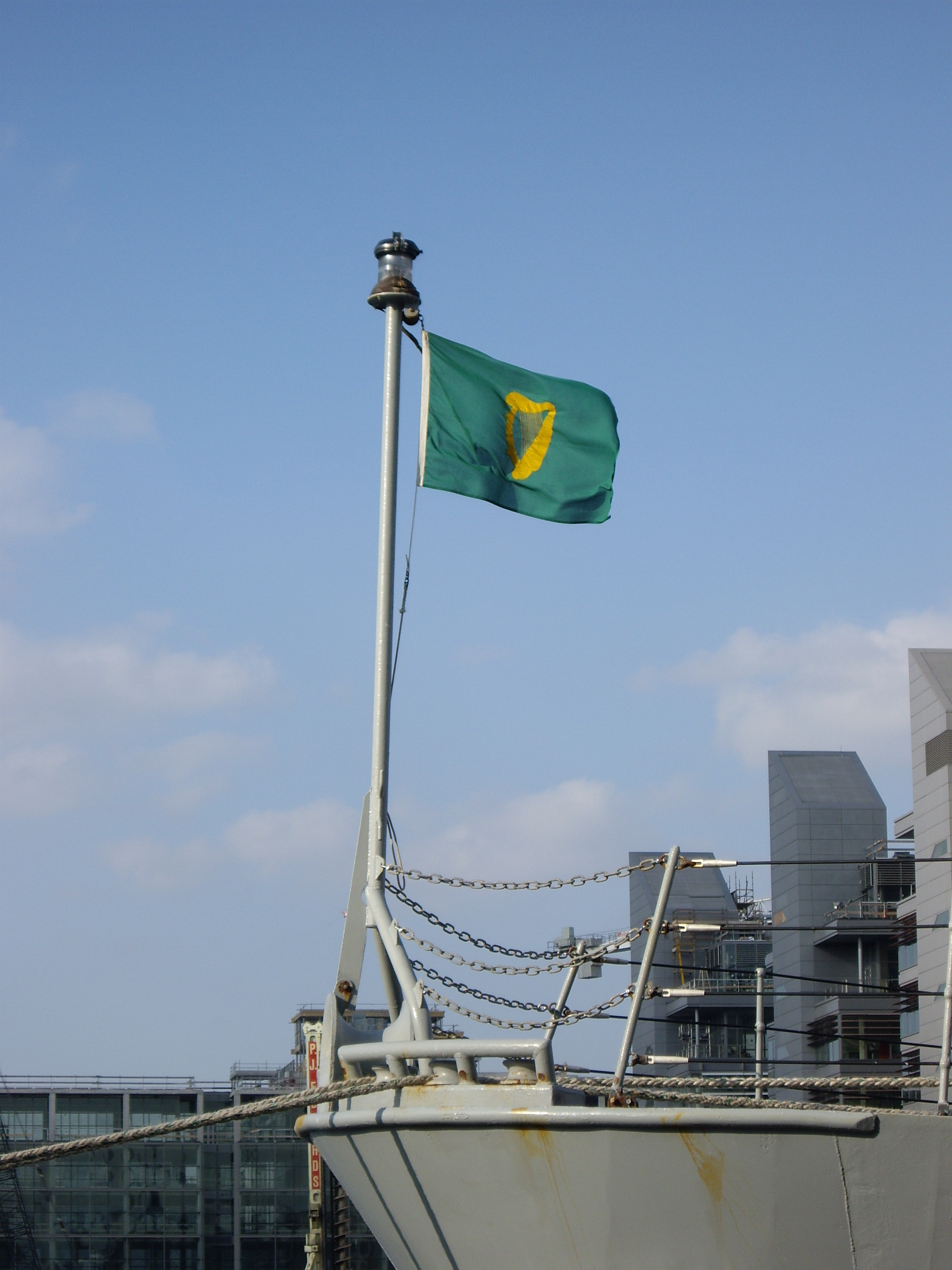
The Irish naval jack flying from the bow of LÉ Aoife while docked in Dublin

=== Other equipment ===
The Naval Service also operates smaller training vessels, rigid-hulled inflatable boats and motor launches. The latter includes the Fionnghuala, an NSR vessel used for maritime security, search and rescue and training.

Air assets to support naval patrols are provided by the Air Corps with their two Airbus C295 maritime patrol aircraft and AW139 helicopters operated from Casement Aerodrome, Baldonnel, County Dublin.

In July 2015, the Irish Naval Service began using an Irish-based satellite communications system for its fleet, with new systems and equipment installed on all vessels. The Irish National Space Centre (NSC) at Elfordstown, Midleton, County Cork, and County Wicklow based company Voyager IP provided the contract.

=== Recent acquisitions ===
In 2010, the government ordered the first of four Samuel Beckett class OPVs. These purchases were informed by a Whitepaper on Defence which expected acquisition of three new naval vessels over 10 years from 2015 to 2025. As well as the acquired and ordered OPVs, the whitepaper covered a multi-role vessel (MRV) – which would be potentially enabled for helicopter operations and have a freight carrying capacity – to replace the flagship LÉ Eithne.

In 2017, a delegation of Department of Defence (DoD) officials and members of the Defence Forces visited New Zealand to inspect the Royal New Zealand Navy (RNZN) multi-role vessel HMNZS Canterbury; it was suggested that a vessel of this type, capable of accommodating and deploying a full infantry company either by landing craft or helicopter, and with a fully equipped hospital, was what the Defence Forces needed for the type of military and humanitarian missions undertaken by Ireland. Plans expected that LÉ Ciara and LÉ Orla be replaced with similar vessels, but with counter-mine and counter-IED capabilities. In August 2021, the Irish Examiner reported that the DoD was considering acquiring two former RNZN Lake-class inshore patrol vessels. These vessels would be based on the east coast and operate mainly in the Irish Sea with the primary role of fisheries protection in light of Brexit.

On 14 March 2022, the DoD announced the acquisition of two such retired RNZN vessels, HMNZS Rotoiti and HMNZS Pukaki, for €26 million, to replace LÉ Orla and LÉ Ciara and with the expectation that they would require less crew to operate. Intended to enter service in 2024, the two vessels arrived in Ireland in May 2023. On 5 April 2024, the DoD announced that the new vessels would be named LÉ Aoibhinn and LÉ Gobnait. On 4 September 2024, the two vessels were commissioned into service.

In 2024, the naval service received YP01 – Fionnghuala. This is the first of four inshore patrol boats, the second of which being YP02 – Aodh, having been delivered in mid 2026.

=== Proposed upgrades ===
Starting in 2027, and expected to finish before the end of that year, several of the Samuel Beckett class OPVs are due to be upgraded with Thales CAPTAS-1 towed sonar systems. Other upgrades reportedly planned include air search radar, electronic warfare systems, and an upgraded Super Rapid main gun, with the ability to shoot down aircraft and drones.

== Weapons ==
| Name | Origin | Type | Caliber | Photo | Notes |
Pistol
| Heckler & Koch USP | Germany | Semi-automatic pistol | 9×19mm | | Standard service pistol |
Assault rifle
| Steyr AUG | Austria | Assault rifle | 5.56×45mm | | Standard service rifle since 1989 |
Battle rifle
| FN FAL | Belgium | Battle rifle | 7.62×51mm | | Only used for line throwing |
Machine gun
| FN MAG | Belgium | Machine gun | 7.62×51mm | | Fitted onboard Naval Service ships for close range weapons support and anti-air point defence. Can also be mounted on RHIBs |
| M2 Browning .50 heavy machine gun (HMG) | United States | Machine gun | 12.7×99mm (.50) | | Fitted onboard Naval Service ships for close range weapons support and anti-air point defence |
Autocannon
| Rheinmetall Rh 202 | Germany | Autocannon | 20×139mm | | Fitted onboard Naval Service ships for close range weapons support and anti-air point defence |
Naval gun
| OTO Melara 76 mm | Italy | Autocannon | 76×900mmR | | Main weapon mounted onboard LÉ Róisín, LÉ Niamh, LÉ Samuel Beckett, LÉ James Joyce, LÉ William Butler Yeats and LÉ George Bernard Shaw |

== Personnel and ranks ==
As of April 2023, there were 764 personnel in the Naval Service, and 77 in the Naval Service Reserve. The head of the Naval Service is the Flag Officer Commanding the Naval Service (FOCNS) with the rank of Commodore. Non-military training takes place alongside Mercantile Marine personnel at the National Maritime College of Ireland in Ringaskiddy, near to the Haulbowline base.

=== Commissioned officer ranks ===
The rank insignia of commissioned officers.

| Rank group | General / flag officers | | | | Senior officers | | | Junior officers |
|---|---|---|---|---|---|---|---|---|---|---|
| Irish Naval Service |
| Irish Naval Service | | Vice admiral | Rear admiral | Commodore | Captain | Commander | Lieutenant commander | Lieutenant | Sub-lieutenant | Ensign |
| Irish Naval Service | | Leas-aimiréal | Seach-aimiréal | Ceannasóir | Captaen | Ceannasaí | Lefteanant-cheannasaí | Lefteanant | Fo-lefteanant | Meirgire |
| Equivalent NATO code (Note: While Ireland is not a member of NATO, it does have an official conversion.) | OF-9 | OF-8 | OF-7 | OF-6 | OF-5 | OF-4 | OF-3 | OF-2 | OF-1 |

==== Student officer ranks ====
| Rank group | Student officer |
|---|---|
| Irish Naval Service |
| Irish Naval Service | Officer cadet Dalta Oifigeach |

=== Other ranks ===
The rank insignia of non-commissioned officers and enlisted personnel.

| Rank group | Senior NCOs | | | | | Junior NCOs | | Enlisted |
|---|---|---|---|---|---|---|---|---|---|
| Irish Naval Service | | | | | | | | | No insignia |
| Irish Naval Service | Warrant officer | Senior chief petty officer | Chief petty officer | Senior petty officer | Petty officer | Leading seaman | Able seaman | Ordinary seaman | Seaman recruit |
| Irish Naval Service | Oifigeach barántais | Ard-mhion-oifigeach sinsearach | Ard-mhion-oifigeach | Mion-oifigeach sinsearach | Mion-oifigeach | Mairnéalach ceannais | Mairnéalach inniúil | Mairnéalach | Earcach |
| Equivalent NATO code | OR-9 | OR-8 | OR-7 | OR-6 | OR-5 | OR-4 | OR-3 | OR-2 | OR-1 |

== See also ==
- Irish Coast Guard
- Marine Institute Ireland
- List of Irish state vessels
- List of navies
