= Fisheries monitoring control and surveillance =

Monitoring, control and surveillance (MCS), in the context of fisheries, is defined by the Food and Agriculture Organization (FAO) of the United Nations as a broadening of traditional enforcing national rules over fishing, to the support of the broader problem of fisheries management.

Internationally, the basis of law for fisheries management comes from the 1982 United Nations Convention on the Law of the Sea (UNCLOS). Further definition was in the Declaration of Cancun This is complemented by the work of a variety of regional organizations that cover high seas fishing areas. A key concept in international fishing laws is that of the Exclusive Economic Zone, which extends 200 miles (370 km) from the coast of nations bordering on the oceans. EEZ is not a meaningful concept in relatively small seas such as the Mediterranean and Baltic, so those areas tend to have regional agreements for MCS of international waters within those seas.

== Components and related activities ==
MCS has aspects distinct from fisheries management, although there is overlap. According to the 2003 FAO paper on Recent Trends, fisheries management consists of:

- Data collection and analysis
- Participatory management planning
- Establishing a regulatory framework
  - Input controls
  - Operational and output controls
- Implementation

While MCS, in the basic FAO definitions, does not include enforcement, that category will be included here as part of the means of implementing MCS operations. In MCS discussions, there is a strong emphasis that the success of MCS is not to be measured in number of arrests, but in the level of compliance with presumably reasonable frameworks (i.e., the "control" part of MCS). If a sense of participation in the development of controls, as well as peer pressure, leads to meeting the fisheries management controls without a single arrest, the MCS program is successful.

=== Monitoring ===
A 1981 Conference of Experts defined monitoring as " the continuous requirement for the measurement of fishing effort characteristics and resource yields." This was expanded, in a 1993 workshop, to include the measurement of:

- catch
- species composition
- fishing effort
- bycatch (i.e., species other than the targeted one incidentally captured by the primary effort)
- area of operations

=== Control ===
According to the 1981 Conference of Experts, control is the "regulatory conditions under which the exploitation of the resource may be conducted." This is usually considered to consist of legislation, regulations, and international agreements. Each of these should describe the management measures required and the requirements that will be enforced. The actual enforcement mechanisms are not part of control.

Management criteria include:

- Establishing designated fishing areas in which no fishing, fishing by vessels with permits, or open fishing is allowed.
- Restrictions on fishing gear, including the banning of certain types on vessels in give areas, or controls on such parameters as the mesh size of fishing nets. These restrictions can be enforced only by physical inspection at sea or at dockside.
- Catch and quota controls, by species or total take
  - Days at sea
  - Daily time at sea
  - Seasonal catch limits
  - Per-trip catch limits
  - Limits on catch within certain areas
  - Individual (vessel) transferable quotas
  - Minimum or maximum fish sizes
  - Bycatch
- Vessel movement controls
  - Into areas
  - Exiting areas
  - Sightings in areas
- Onboard observers
- Licensing

Vessel inspections

=== Surveillance ===
Surveillance, according to the 1981 Conference of Experts, are "the degree and types of observations required to maintain compliance with the regulatory controls imposed on fishing activities." The Ghana workshop termed it the "regulation and supervision of fishing activity..." This definition does not clearly include enforcement.

Through surveillance, overfishing by authorized fishers and poaching by unauthorized fishers can be detected. Many systems are involved in the technical process of surveillance. Radar, including coastal, airborne, and spaceborne systems, may be intended for national security or law enforcement, but can simultaneously provide information to fisheries management and environmental protection authorities. Vessel monitoring system principally intended for fisheries surveillance can provide critical information to search and rescue (SAR) under the International Convention for the Safety of Life at Sea (SOLAS) and its associated Global Maritime Distress Safety System (GMDSS).

=== Enforcement ===
Enforcement ranges from self-regulation to onboard observers to patrol platforms (vessels and aircraft) to law enforcement activity.

== Spatial Components ==
MCS implementation has sea, land, and aerospace aspects. Monitoring systems, such as Vessel monitoring system, may operate in all three of these regimes. These aspects also affect other maritime systems that can cooperate with VMS, such as Automatic Identification Systems (AIS) with their specialized Vessel Traffic Services (VTS), radar surveillance of the seas, and pollution tracking mechanisms.

=== Sea components ===
Perhaps the most basic component, aboard fishing vessels, are the logs and catch reporting completed by the fishers themselves. Closely associated are reports prepared by onboard observers.

Also on the fishing vessel can be the shipboard components of vessel monitoring system (VMS). These can be independent systems involving navigational and time input, embedded and dedicated computer, and radio transmission of reports. The transmission is usually via satellite, but some countries are using coastal VHF repeater systems.

VMS components can also integrate with other shipboard electronics. For example, if the report generation component is on a general-purpose personal computer, that computer may also run a chartplotter and various catch planning applications. The chart plotter function may be a general-purpose graphic display, presenting radar or bottom sounder/fish finder data, perhaps merged with electronic charts.

=== Surface components ===
Catch inspectors, as well as electronic or hard copy filings of catch and other reports, are basic land components of MCS. Fisheries management authorities who make real-time decisions about opening or closing restricted fishing areas are usually on land, and will communicate their decisions on paper, using websites or electronic mail, and by voice radio.

Within a vessel monitoring system (VMS), the Fisheries Management Center (FMC) components are on land. Minimally, this is a regional or national center of the nation in whose waters the fishing is happening. Under the Flag Principle, the VMS of a vessel registered in a nation other than the coastal or EEZ nation of the fishing area will transmit to its national FMC, which will then relay the information to the FMC where the vessel is operating.

Patrol vessels may do visual or electronic surveillance of fishing vessels at sea, or may board them for spot inspections. Fisheries management vessels also may independently monitor fish densities in the areas of interest, water conditions, or other observations of interest for operations or research.

=== Aerospace components ===
Satellite imagery is responsible for the large majority of monitoring and surveillance in the area around West Africa.

Low-flying aircraft can visually identify fishing vessels, and, with reasonable navigational skills, determine whether a given craft is in an authorized area. This is aided if the fishing craft display distinctive identifiers.

Higher-flying aircraft using radar and other sensors can determine which vessels are in a designated open or closed fishing area, and the ashore FMC can correlate these observations with VMS data.

Communications satellites, in both low Earth orbit and geosynchronous orbit are the backbone of VMS communications with FMCs. Radar satellites can locate vessels in a far larger area than can aircraft, but have little or no ability to characterize the vessel.

== By location ==
=== Africa ===
Doumbouya et al., 2017 find West Africa needs a great increase in monitoring and surveillance.
