= LÉ Ferdia =

History

Denmark
- Name: Helen Basse
- Namesake: Helen Basse
- Launched: 1965

Ireland
- Name: Ferdia
- Namesake: Ferdia (Ferdiad)
- In service: 1977
- Out of service: 1978
- Identification: IMO number: 6517055; Hull number: A16
- Fate: Returned to owners

General characteristics
- Type: Stern trawler, seismic survey vessel, auxiliary ship
- Displacement: 651 t
- Length: 64 m (210 ft) overall
- Beam: 9.6 m (31 ft)
- Draught: 4.3 m (14 ft)
- Installed power: 1500 hp
- Propulsion: Deutz AG diesel engine
- Speed: 15 kn (28 km/h) maximum
- Complement: 44
- Armament: 2 × Oerlikon 20 mm cannon

LÉ Ferdia (A16) was an auxiliary ship in the Irish Naval Service. She was named after Ferdia (Ferdiad), a mythical hero of the Ulster Cycle. She served as a patrol boat. Originally a Danish ship, the MFV Helen Basse, she was leased by the INS in 1977–78 and was later a seismic survey vessel.
