= Vessel monitoring system =

Commercial fishing tracking system

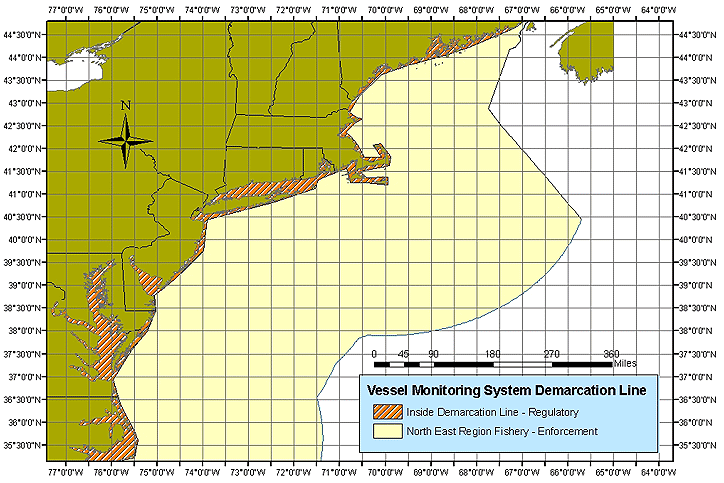
NOAA Atlantic fisheries area where VMS must be used

Vessel Monitoring Systems (VMS) is a general term to describe systems that are used in commercial fishing to allow environmental and fisheries regulatory organizations to track and monitor the activities of fishing vessels. They are a key part of monitoring control and surveillance (MCS) programs at national and international levels. VMS may be used to monitor vessels in the territorial waters of a country or a subdivision of a country, or in the Exclusive Economic Zones (EEZ) that extend 200 nautical miles (370 kilometres) from the coasts of many countries. VMS systems are used to improve the management and sustainability of the marine environment, through ensuring proper fishing practices and the prevention of illegal fishing, and thus protect and enhance the livelihoods of fishermen.

The exact functionality of a VMS system and the associated equipment varies with the requirements of the nation of the vessel's registry, and the regional or national water in which the vessel is operating. Within regional and national VMS initiatives there are also sub-divisions which apply different functionality to different vessel categories. Categories may be size or type of vessel or activity. For example:

- Local/regional fish such as scallops in the Northeast U.S., anchovies in Peruvian waters, or rock shrimp in the Gulf of Mexico
- Highly migratory species (HMS) such as tuna and billfish, or Patagonian toothfish (Dissostichus eleginoides) in the Antarctic. which can be caught in multiple regions

In this discussion, VMS relates specifically to fisheries management systems. VMS describes the specific application of monitoring commercial fishing boats. It is not to be confused with vessel traffic service (VTS) which is describes the specific application of monitoring marine traffic primarily for safety and efficiency in ports and busy waterways. It is also not to be confused with specific communication technologies such as AIS, Iridium, Inmarsat, Argos, GPRS which relate to the communication method on which data is transmitted. Different VMS systems will use different communication technologies depending on the functionality requirements imposed by a national or regional VMS initiative.

The cost of VMS components will vary according to the functionality requirements of the specific system being implemented. In general the higher the functionality the more expensive the equipment and required data link (airtime costs). The cost of a VMS system therefore varies and thus the level of government subsidy (if any) varies according to national and regional requirements. EU and US VMS systems require expensive onboard equipment and large amounts of data to be transmitted over satellite link resulting in high airtime charges, but also provide a very high level of functionality. In other regions where per vessel cost and huge fleet sizes are an issue, communication technologies such as AIS are used which significantly reduce equipment and airtime costs whilst delivering acceptable basic VMS system functionality.

== Applications ==
VMS is intended principally for fisheries management, but the country using it may use the data for other purposes. See the broad framework of Monitoring control and surveillance.

=== Fisheries management ===
Among all the most basic purposes is to monitor the movement of VMS-equipped vessels with respect to restricted fishing areas. A given vessel may have approval to fish in a restricted area, to transit through it without fishing, or it may not be allowed in the area.

==== Catch reporting ====
Not all VMS systems are required to record and transmit catch reports. On the systems with separate PCs, it is reasonably easy to distribute separate software, although the fishermen may or may not be able to install it without assistance and additional equipment. For VMS with dedicated PCs, additional software can be made part of software support with established channels.

In the EU and US there is a distinct trend to making catch reporting part of an overall MCS program, although current VMS systems rarely integrate this capability with position reporting. One system that does do this is Fulcrum Maritime Systems Limited's Vessel Tracking Service which uses the latest data rich satellite application technology to enable electronic catch reports to be sent from the vessel to the VMS directly and automatically sends the report and vessel position data to the appropriate RFO or Regulatory Fishing Body, such as the NEAFC.

Under the European Union scheme, vessels are generally required to report

- Catch on entry
- Weekly catch
- Transshipment
- Port of landing
- Catch on exit

Within the EU an Electronic Reporting System is being implemented as part of the EU VMS system to automate collection of catch data, and exchange of data between EU states. A number of programs require tracking of days at sea (DAS) for a given vessel. They may require tracking the total cumulative catch of a given fishery.

See Fisheries Monitoring Centre from Fulcrum Maritime Systems Limited: www.fulcrum-maritime.com

==== Fisheries research and analysis ====
VMS is a planning and analysis tool as well as an aid to operations. Treated as a research database, the cumulative position reports gives an analysis of fishing vessel tracks in search of fish. Coupled with species-specific fishing licenses and catch reports, fisheries managers can estimate the amount of a given fish in an area, the amount taken by fishing vessels, and project overfishing before it happens.

=== Safety ===
VMS itself can help in search and rescue (SAR), especially when the SAR organization participates in the Global Maritime Distress Safety System (GMDSS). Some VMS have built-in Emergency Position-Indicating Radio Beacons (EPIRB), or SART capability although a dedicated VMS unit may not be able to have an emergency beacon that automatically floats to the surface and starts transmitting when it detects it is in salt water. At the very least, the SAR agency can get a last reported location of the vessel, and perhaps its course, from the FMC.

=== Enforcement ===
VMS obviously is part of fisheries enforcement, but, along with other systems, it can be part of overall sea surveillance. When a radar or other sensor detects a given vessel, VMS can tell the center that monitors the radar whether the radar target is a known fishing vessel. There may be correlation between AIS/VTS and VMS.

== Technologies and components ==
Any vessel tracking system, including VMS, requires technology on the vessel, ashore, and communications between them. In addition, there may be additional communications from the Fisheries Management Center (FMC) of the vessel's country of registry, and regional or national FMCs of the waters in which the vessel is fishing.

=== Functions aboard the vessel ===
The most basic function of a VMS is to determine the vessel's location at a given time, and periodically transmit this information, to a monitoring station ashore. Different VMS systems use different communication technologies, including AIS, Inmarsat, Iridium and Argos depending on the functionality required by the particular VMS system.

VMS components on the vessel sometimes are called VMS, or sometimes Automatic Location Communicators (ALC). These minimally include a GPS antenna and receiver, a computer (which may be embedded or user-supplied), and a transmitter and antenna appropriate for the communications that links the vessel to the flag center.

In practice, many of the VMS components also have applicability, along with non-VMS marine electronics, to a wide range of functions aboard a fishing vessel. These include navigation, finding fish, collision avoidance, routine voice and email communications, etc.

Selecting a VMS system is most dependent on what vendors and models have been approved by the fishing vessel's state of registry and the functionality requirements. Normally an authority will specify specific approved equipment to ensure end to end system integrity and service level meeting the specific requirements applicable to the vessel type. For example, some systems require a user interface on the vessel, whilst others will have a simple black box transceiver with no user interface.

VMS software and devices for the fishing vessel include:

- Absolute Software
- AMS
- Argonet-vms CLS
- AST Ltd
- Big Ocean Data/Globavista/Bluefinger/Thales
- BlueTraker
- Boatracs
- CLS - VMS NEMO/TRITON
- Faria
- Fishery Solution vTrack VMS - Vessel Tracking, Electronic Logbook
- Free Port - Eye from a sky
- CLS UK - Vessel Tracking, Fleet Tracking, Fisheries Monitoring
- Honeywell
- Maritime Systems - Inshore Vessel Monitoring System
- Monicap
- Skymate
- SRT Marine System Solutions
- Thrane & Thrane
- vTrack - Fishery Solution, a complete VMS system
- MetOcean Telematics iTrac VMS
- GMV

=== Communications ===
VMS units principally rely on global navigation satellite systems (GNSS) such as GPS for position and time information. LORAN may be a backup or complementary technology. These transceivers transmit data to monitoring systems generally using a variety of communication technologies including terrestrial and satellite AIS and conventional satellite systems from Inmarsat, Iridium, Argos, Orbcomm or Qualcomm. Increasingly nations are implementing a mixture of technologies with the largest vessels over 60 tons being required to use the expensive traditional satellites and smaller vessels to use AIS.

- Operated by Inmarsat plc, founded by governments but now commercial, Inmarsat has a constellation of geosynchronous communications satellites.
- Iridium uses a constellation of 66 Low Earth Orbit satellites to provide complete global coverage (including all ocean regions and both poles) with real-time coverage.
- Automatic Identification System – AIS is an IMO supported technology – provides low cost dual terrestrial and long-range satellite maritime data communications. It offers a base level of VMS functionality with global coverage at the lowest cost.
- Argos uses low Earth orbit European and US satellites in polar orbit, which is an especially appropriate orbit for vessels operating in high latitudes.
- Skymate uses Orbcomm LEO satellites, which is optimized for machine-to-machine communications, potentially at lower cost than voice-capable satellite systems. They operate in the VHF and UHF bands, and have demonstrated an AIS capability.
- Qualcomm provides access to the Iridium satellite systems.
- BlueTraker uses both GPRS and Iridium constellation to provide the biggest flexibility and the lowest communication costs. The BlueTraker is a stand-alone device fully integrated including the antennas, the communication modules and a back-up battery. It is also e-logbook ready.
- iTrac is certified by the Canadian Department of Fisheries and Oceans, has integrated GPS and uses the Iridium satellite system network to provide communication as well as e-mail access.

| VMS/ALC Vendor | Product type | Communications | Communications type |
|---|---|---|---|
| Applied Satellite Technology | Integrated Hybrid device with internal back-up battery, antennas and e-logbook capabilities | Dual mode GPRS and Iridium communications | VMS+ device Polar LEO with satellite-to-satellite |
| Blue Oceans Satellite Systems | GPS; duplex communication; Web-based monitoring interface | Iridium and Globalstar | Low-earth orbiting (LEO), cross-linked satellites operating as a fully meshed network and supported by multiple in-orbit spares. |
| Boatracs | Dedicated with phone, fax, email | Qualcomm | LEO L-band uplink |
| CLS | Argos | GPS with uplink | Polar LEO with satellite-to-satellite |
| CLS UK | Web based tracking for maritime or land-based assets, Fisheries Monitoring Centre, | Open - Inmarsat-C, Skywave, Satamatics, Iridium, Globalstar | Systems Integrator, Bespoke system design, Supplier of tracking systems and devices, Simplex or Duplex, Ring Fencing, Movement detection, Global Coverage. |
| Globavista | Web based tracking, Ship Security Alert System and telemetry system | Open - AIS, Inmarsat-C, Skywave, Iridium, GSM/GPRS, Hybrid devices | Integrator/Supplier of the majority of tracking devices |
| Maritime Systems | Compact IP67 unit with internal antennas, back up battery, tamper detection for fisheries monitoring | GSM/GPRS, 4G LTE, 2G fallback | Internal data storage with upload over GSM, remote servers forwarding data to international fisheries management |
| Satrax ETS-1000 | Dedicated computer with telephone | Iridium | Polar LEO with satellite-to-satellite |
| Satrax ETS-250 | Dedicated computer | Orbcomm | Polar LEO with satellite-to-satellite |
| Skymate | GPS and uplink antenna; PC software for VMS, weather, fish prices, surface temperature, log | Orbcomm | LEO VHF Uplink |
| SRT Marine System Solutions | Optimal AIS based VMS system for fishing vessels below 60 tons. High functionality combined with low cost and sophisticated display and data management systems which fuse terrestrial and satellite AIS to provide full EEZ and if required, global, coverage. | | |
| exactEarth | A operator of a global network of low orbit AIS satellites which use technology such as ABSEA to receive transmissions from Class B and Identifier type AIS VMS transceivers. | | |
| Thrane & Thrane | Dedicated computer with voice and email | Inmarsat-C | Geosynchronous satellite |
| Honeywell or Skywave | Low-cost, small transceivers with integrated GPS | Inmarsat-D+ | Geosynchronous satellite |
| MetOcean Telematics | Low-cost, DFO Canada Certified, also gives users the ability to communicate via email over Iridium | Iridium | LEO Satellite Communications |
| EMA - BlueTraker | all-integrated Hybrid device (GPRS and satellite communications) with internal back-up battery, antennas and e-logbook capabilities | GPRS and Iridium | Polar LEO with satellite-to-satellite |
| Free Port - Eye from a sky (Maestral 2009) | integrated black-box device (GPS positioning, GPRS/EDGE and satellite communications) with internal back-up battery, external antenna and PC software for monitoring, surveillance, communication and data gathering | GPRS/EDGE and Iridium | Polar LEO with satellite-to-satellite |
| Xsealence - Sea Technologies | 4th generation, all-integrated device with hybrid communications (satellite and/or short/medium range), anti-tampering facility with internal back-up battery, data gathering and communication hub | Open - Inmarsat-C, Iridium, AIS, GPRS/EDGE and Wi-Fi | Polar LEO with satellite-to-satellite |

=== Fisheries management center of the vessel's nation ===
Software at the fisheries management organization looks for several pieces of information:

- location vis-a-vis restricted area
- time at sea
- time in restricted area, possibly separating fishing and transit time by speed

A restricted area may be closed for all purposes, open to transit, open to fishing for a specific period, or open to designated vessels only. Vessel speed is often the way its status is determined in lieu of direct observation. Some VMS directly report speed, or speed can be calculated by FMS software based on the time stamps of different position reports. A rule of thumb in scallop fisheries, for example, is that the vessel cannot be dredging for scallops if its speed is greater than 5 knots (9 km/h).

FMC software can note the time a vessel leaves and returns to port, and the time it is inside or outside designated areas. There may be restrictions on trip length, time in an area, etc., which can be calculated directly from VMS data. Other observations may require correlation of catch reports with the vessel's presence in given areas. Presence in other areas may require an onboard observer.

Individual regional, national, and international FMCs have different levels of software intelligence, which can detect patterns of interest to SAR, fisheries management, or law enforcement.

=== Fisheries monitoring center of the waters being fished ===
Countries with registered fishing vessels that employ VMS generally agree to set up a Fisheries Monitoring Center (FMC), which has a data network connection to the FMCs of other states as well as other maritime stakeholders within the country. This flag state principle requires all vessels, registered in a given state to transmit their positions automatically to that state's FMC. When the vessel enters the waters of a different state, the home FMC must forward the report of the vessel's entry into those waters to the foreign state FMC. Until the vessel leaves the foreign state's coastal area, the home FMC must forward to the foreign state FMC the position, speed, and course reports at least every two hours. Exchange of data between VMS servers within the EU is regulated by the European Commission to be formatted according to the NAF FORMAT, originally devised by NAFO and subsequently adopted in a slightly different format by NEAFC. VMS servers outside of the EU may optionally also use the NAF format due to its widespread use within the EU. Data is usually transmitted using HTTPS protocol either by an HTTP Post or an HTTP Get request. Other protocols such as X.25 have historically been used but are in decline.

The NAF format is being replaced by FLUX, which defines messages and forwarding rules for many messages related to various business processes associated with VMS operation.

If position reports unexpectedly cease from a vessel, the FMC for the ocean area from which the last signal was received must attempt to contact the vessel or the flag state FMC without delay. Since VMS reports are sent automatically, it is possible that there is nothing wrong with the vessel itself, only the VMS. A full search and rescue (SAR) operation should not be launched simply because a VMS report does not arrive, although it is reasonable to alert sea surveillance assets, such as radars, that might be able to find the vessel. Fishing vessel crews should check the VMS at reasonable intervals, and confirm it is working.

While the procedure will vary with the jurisdiction, if an at-sea vessel finds their VMS is not working and they cannot fix it, they may be able to contact the FMC and get permission to continue the voyage. If they do get such authorization, they may get an inspection when they return to port. The FMC may also order them back to port. It is unlikely they will be allowed to leave port again without the VMS being repaired, so that they may need 24/7 VMS technical services at their home port.

Position reports received by the FMC should be forwarded automatically to the FMC of the vessel's registry. FMCs and other organizations, such as SAR and research, which receive VMS data must comply with confidentiality agreements. All recipients of data are also in accordance with agreements obliged to handle the data they receive in a responsible manner.

=== Catch documentation scheme ===
Catch reports are not themselves part of VMS, but often will be correlated with VMS data as part of an overall fisheries MCS program.

=== VTS and GMDSS ===
These are specific safety and traffic management systems which generally do not include specific fishery functionality as required by VMS.

=== AIS ===
AIS is often confused as a system comparable to VMS or VTS. AIS is a communications technology which is normally used within VTS and VMS applications. AIS is typically used on VMS systems deployed on smaller fishing vessels under 60tons. The implementation of AIS as part of these systems is also often customized to include encryption and other functionality.

== International programs ==
Given that fish exist in food chains, it is worth noting that the United Nations is at the logical top of the VMS chain, under the authority of the United Nations Convention on Law of the Sea (UNCLOS). While it does not contain any provisions that are directly related to the use of VMS, it establishes a number of important principles of relevance for this study, relating to the conservation and management of living resources, both within national jurisdictions and on the high seas. UN fisheries operations are under the Food and Agriculture Organization.

=== Antarctic ===
Under the Commission for the Conservation of Antarctic Marine Living Resources (CCAMLR), a number of member states monitor agreed-to conservation measures and research information. The major emphasis is on the Dissostichus sp. catch (i.e., Patagonian toothfish and Antarctic cod) also known as Chilean sea bass. Realtime VMS is required for most exploratory VMS, with delayed reporting for other longline fisheries and for finfish trawling. The flag state VMS architecture is used, where the national FMCs of vessel registry, starting in 2005, transmit to the CCAMLR regional FMC.

Member states under the agreement are Argentina, Australia, Belgium, Brazil, Chile, European Community, France, Germany, India, Italy, Japan, Republic of Korea, Namibia, New Zealand, Norway, Poland, Russian Federation, South Africa, Spain, Sweden, Ukraine, United Kingdom of Great Britain and Northern Ireland, United States of America, and Uruguay. In addition, Bulgaria, the Cook Islands, Canada, Finland, Greece, Netherlands, Peru, and Vanuatu accede to the convention. In practice, up to 50 vessels are expected to be monitored, and about 15 of the convention states actually fish in the area. The longline vessels range from 349 to 2,203 long tons (355 to 2,238 tonnes).

Depending on the latitude, satellite communications may require polar-orbiting satellites, or the vessel may be in line of sight of a geosynchronous satellite.

=== Europe ===
Under the European Union legislation, VMS is a legal requirement for vessels in excess of 15 metres. By 1999, Europe had 7000 vessels, in excess of 15 meters, under VMS. Since 2005, all Community vessels automatically transmit vessel identification, date, time, position, course and speed either hourly or every 2 hours (if the responsible Fisheries Monitoring Centre can request positions). The only exception is for vessels that operate only inside home waters, and are used exclusively for aquaculture.

One of the challenges for European MCS is that the idea of a 200-nautical-mile (370 km) EEZ is meaningless for nations with coasts in small seas such as the Mediterranean or Baltic. In such circumstances, appropriate international agreements need to be developed to govern fishing beyond the territorial limit and thus on the high seas, but high seas that would have overlapping jurisdiction in an EEZ-based model.

There are precedents where maritime pollution already is handled on a basin basis, which might provide a framework for fisheries enforcement in international waters of a small sea:

- Mediterranean (Barcelona Convention)
- Baltic (Helsinki Convention)
- North Sea (Bonn Agreement)

A recent IMO regulation requires AIS transponders aboard vessels, which transmit identifier, name and position of vessels not limited to fishing. Another approach might involve either AIS, or the more finely grained VTS, agreements that use coastal radar to monitor ships in and beyond coastal waters. This allows a transport vessel, for example, to be tracked in the small sea.

Another cross-check could involve current EU RADARSAT ScanSAR imagery, correlated with transponder information, such that only radar images of ships without active transponders display to enforcement personnel. At present, however, inspectors on aircraft or surface patrol vessels may not have real-time access to satellite imagery. Currently, the fusion of VMS, radar (satellite, aircraft, or coastal) has to be done at an operations center ashore. Another complication is that enforcement organizations for such things as spill monitoring are not concerned with issues such as illegal fishing.

In order to coordinate the policy making and enforcement efforts the EFCA - European Fisheries Control Agency in Vigo, Spain has been established. The operational cooperation between Member States is organized with Joint Deployment Plans (JDPs). In order to support the JDPs, EFCA is operating a Vessel Monitoring system that in its first two years of operation (2009–2011) has exchanged 8 million VMS messages from 4520 vessels of 49 Flag States. The VMS software used by EFCA is vTrack.

=== Northwest Atlantic ===
The Northwest Atlantic Fisheries Organization is composed of Canada, Cuba, Denmark (in respect of the Faroe Islands and Greenland), European Union, France (in respect of St Pierre et Miquelon), Iceland, Japan, Republic of Korea, Norway, Russian Federation, Ukraine, United States of America.

Under this agreement are all fisheries, principally trawl and longline, except crab, lobster, salmon, sedentary species, whale and tuna. Approximately 135 vessels are monitored, the majority of which are trawlers with a few longline, ranging from 500 to over 2000 gross weight tons (GWT).

The VMS software used is vTrack.

=== Northeast Atlantic ===
The North-East Atlantic Fisheries Commission (NEAFC) has five Contracting Parties, Denmark (in respect of the Faroe Islands and Greenland), the European Union, Iceland, Norway and the Russian Federation.

This convention (1980) regulates fisheries in the high seas (Regulatory Area) and waters under national jurisdiction, including trawlers, purse seiners, longliners, and gill netters. VMS is required, since 1 July 1999, for any vessel of 24 meters or longer overall length. NEAFC is a secondary user of data receiving it from flag state FMCs; the NEAFC database connects to national FMCs of Germany, Denmark, Spain, Estonia, France, Faroe Islands, United Kingdom, Greenland, Ireland, Iceland, Latvia, Lithuania, Netherlands, Norway, Poland, Portugal, Russian Federation, Sweden and the European Fisheries Control Agency. It is also connected to Co-operating Non-Contracting Parties FMCs of the Bahamas, Liberia and St Kitts and Nevis.

In 2004, 1473 vessels were monitored, with 800 authorized to fish for regulated species (Regulated Resources).

Fisheries surveillance platforms (vessels and aircraft) will also transmit information on their operations in the Regulatory Area, including:

- surveillance entry
- observations
- surveillance exit

NEAFC participated as an observer in, a project funded by the EU to use satellite radar images to validate VMS information and to complement and optimise surveillance tasks. NEAFC decided, based on the results of the EU-funded IMPAST (Improving Fisheries Monitoring By Integrating Passive and Active Satellite Technologies), to deploy a Vessel Detection System (VDS) in several coastal states. NEAFC also participated in the EU-funded SHEEL (Secure and Harmonized European Electronic Logbook) and CEDER (Catch, Effort and Discard Estimate in Real-time) projects, which may lead to direct electronic reporting of real-time catch data. Trackwell is the VMS, ERS and FLUX provider to NEAFC.

=== Pacific Islands ===
The FFA has 16 country members and one territory member from the western and central Pacific region. It is based in Honiara, Solomon Islands. While the FFA proper was formed over 20 years ago, VMS operation began in late 1997, covering the EEZs of 16 South Pacific countries.

FFA VMS is expected to cover 2000+ vessels, transmitting via Inmarsat-C and reporting every 4 hours. The Vessel Monitoring System is provided by Trackwell.

=== Southern Africa ===
Fisheries are a major component of the economies of the coastal member states of the SADC (Angola, Namibia, South Africa, Mozambique, Tanzania, Mauritius and Seychelles).

Due to limited resources, there is little VMS beyond experiments in Namibia and South Africa. There is a European Union funded project to improve monitoring.

=== West Africa ===
The Sub-Regional Fisheries Commission (SRFC) based at Dakar, Senegal is made up of west African States, namely Cape Verde, The Gambia, Guinea, Guinea-Bissau, Mauritania, Sierra Leone, and Senegal. Its role is to promote fisheries cooperation between its member States.

The donor is the Grand Duchy of Luxembourg and the executing agency is the FAO and Lux-Development. Participating countries are These countries are members of the Sub-Regional Fisheries Commission (CRSP) with the addition of Sierra Leone. The project proposed is a continuation and extension of the AFR/101 Project (FAO), which may add VMS to supplement the present air surveillance.

== National ==
This section deals with the specifics of national use of VMS, rather than their overall approach to fisheries management.

=== Albania ===
Albania is currently implementing a VMS for its 220 vessels fishing fleet, combining satellite and GPRS communications channels. The BlueTraker VMS solution, which is E-Logbook ready, is supplied by company EMA.

=== Australia ===
Australia has both national and state programs. The national-level program is run by the Australian Government agency, the Australian Fisheries Management Authority (AFMA). VMS runs on about 500 (growth expected to 800) vessels from small 10-meter scallop boats to 850-meter deep sea trawlers. The Vessel Monitoring System run by AFMA is provided by Trackwell

Fisheries of interest include orange roughy, scallops, prawns, tuna and billfish. Fishers must use AFMA-approved VMS devices.

==== Southern Australia ====
There is a regional organization of Southern Australian states which monitors rock lobster, giant crab, and, on a sampling basis, aquaculture.

=== Canada ===
Since 2001, Canada has mandated VMS, for vessels of certain sizes, to fish for specific species in designated areas. The underlying MCS strategies, while differing in specific fisheries, are based on limited entry licensing, with restrictions on vessel and gear types. Canada expects VMS reports every two hours.

Canadian activities involving VMS are joint between the Department of Fisheries & Oceans (DFO) and the Department of National Defense (DND). DND is the lead department for an inter-Departmental web-based mapping application, supported by positional information from DFO.

DND provides non-VMS surveillance data to a DND-operated data base available to DFO for fisheries management. Aerial surveillance, using a variety of sensors, monitors freighters, tankers, bulk carriers and container ships as well as fishing vessels.

Canada intends to provide, in real time, VMS data, correlated with other sensors and database information, to patrol vessels and aircraft. Electronic logs, two-way communication with fishing vessels, issuing orders, and possibly placing video and other sensors on fishing.

=== Chile ===
Chile has VMS aboard approximately 500 vessels, each vessel being associated with one fishery.

Marimsys built the Chilean VMS, but that system was replaced in 2007 with a new one provided by CLS.

Chile went from a government-specified VMS to a type-approval system for VMS units in an open market, which drove down costs.

Monitored industrial fishing boats limit fishing activities to—generally—5 nautical miles (9 km) from the coast of Chile. This leaves the 5 nm zone for "artisanal" or smaller fishing boats and limits excessive fishing effort being applied to inshore waters.

Chile also pioneered in the emission of reports at short intervals. Prior systems had focussed on "where is the vessel" with the provision of hourly reporting. The Chilean system, by dropping the minimum report interval to 8 minutes is capable of determining "what" the vessel is doing. When you see a series of circular positions, they are all at speeds of below 2 knots (4 km/h) and reflect the drift of the current—there is no question, that vessel was purse seining, and the printout of the chart can be shown to the court to demonstrate the fact.

Chile is currently the world's largest producer of farmed salmon and has a mussel culture industry that is supplying the world market. Other fisheries of interest include alfonsino, anchovies, cod, cuttlefish, hake, mackerel, ray, sardines, sea bream, squid, and swordfish.

The system is also used to monitor foreign vessels entering and leaving both the EEZ and Chilean ports.

=== Taiwan ===
Taiwan has national and provincial VMS programs, the most active being for Taiwan. It uses both Inmarsat-C and Argos to monitor up to 1200 vessels.

=== Croatia ===
Croatia has implemented its VMS on 256 vessels in 2007. The BlueTraker VMS devices, supplied by EMA, enable utilization of both satellite and GPRS communication channels. VMS software solution is developed and supported by GDI GISDATA, a Croatian company. Croatian Fisheries department uses it to identify and track the country's large fishing vessels. This information can be used for monitoring boat activity and as evidence for law enforcement.

The main components of VMS are the department's centralized database, tracking devices, and ArcGIS. Whether at the department, in the harbor office, or on a boat, an inspector can access the GIS to track a vessel and get information about its owner, type, and gear on board and a host of other information. VMS collects vessel information in real time, such as location, speed, direction, and even battery status. Developed on ArcGIS for Server using the ArcGIS API for JavaScript, the system integrates with vessel data stored in the Microsoft SQL Server database and publishes dynamic content.

=== Denmark ===
Denmark has a nationwide VMS based on Inmarsat-C transceivers owned and maintained by the authorities. The VMS software is vTrack. The system monitors 600 vessels.

=== Ecuador ===
Ecuador uses VMS for tuna, under the Association of Tuna Fishing Companies of Ecuador (ATUNEC).

=== Estonia ===
Estonia has a nationwide VMS based on Inmarsat-C hardware and vTrack software. The system monitors 50 vessels. The Estonian VMS system is operated by the Estonian Environmental Inspectorate. The VMS software is vTrack.

=== Falkland Islands ===
The Falkland Islands has a VMS program for all vessels licensed to fish in its waters.The VMS software is provided by the Icelandic company Trackwell. Trackwell FiMS.

=== Faeroe Islands ===
Faeroe Islands has a nationwide VMS based on Inmarsat-C hardware. The system monitors 150 vessels. The VMS software is vTrack.

=== France ===
Implementing its FMC at the CROSS sea rescue center at Etel, France uses the flag state principle described under Norway. The MAR-GE unit is a self-contained GPS and Argos device. France expects 2-hour reporting.

=== Germany ===
The German VMS is based on Inmarsat-C transceivers. The VMS software is vTrack. The system monitors 300 vessels.

=== Greenland ===
Greenland VMS is based on Argos/CLS and Inmarsat-C transceivers. The VMS software is vTrack. The system monitors 100 vessels.

=== Iceland ===
Iceland uses VMS for both safety and fisheries compliance, monitoring with Inmarsat-C, AIS, and various iridium based systems. Approximately 1600 vessels of all sizes are monitored. The Vessel Monitoring System is provided by Trackwell.

=== India ===
India is introducing VMS for its EEZ, along with a system of permits to control capacity.

=== Indonesia ===
Indonesia's VMS system is the largest, or among the largest, in the world. 5500 fishing vessels active each month, with six ashore FMCs. A distinctive feature of the Indonesian system is that an initial 15 patrol boats can directly receive VMS information.

=== Ireland ===
The Irish VMS system is operated by the Irish Naval Service's Fisheries Monitoring Centre, based out of Naval Base Haulbowline in County Cork. As well as monitoring Irish vessels, the VMS exchanges data with VMS systems operated by other EU states.

=== Japan ===
A framework for groundfish fisheries in the Northwest Pacific's high seas was established in January 2007 in a consultation involving Japan, Russia, South Korea and the United States. VMS will be used to collect data.

=== Lithuania ===
Lithuania has a nationwide VMS based on Inmarsat-C hardware. The system monitors 50 vessels. The VMS software is vTrack.

=== Malaysia ===
Malaysia uses VMS on its Malaysian Maritime Enforcement Agency patrol boats and also on larger fishing vessels, through the Fisheries Department.

=== Malta ===
Malta monitors approximately 60 vessels. Trackwell is providing the VMS software and FLUX communication.

=== Mexico ===
Under current Mexican law, it is illegal for commercial boats like longliners and drift gillnetters, to take fish reserved for sports fishing within fifty miles (80 km) of the coast in the Sea of Cortez, and any fish within 12 nautical miles (22 km) of the Revillagigedo Islands. VMS is seen as the only way Mexico will to enforce controls on areas in its EEZ.

=== Morocco ===
Morocco are currently implementing a VMS system combining satellite tracking and radar correlation, supplied primarily by BlueFinger Ltd.

=== Namibia ===
The fisheries in Namibia are among the largest in Africa, with some of the most sophisticated MCS systems.

VMS is fully operational and has been implemented across many fishing fleets. Following an EU funded MCS program for the SADC region, Namibia has facilities to integrate its VMS data with that of other SADC partners so that information can be shared regarding vessels that operate across the border in another SADC states waters. Similarly, Namibia can receive VMS information from its SADC partners when a vessel from another SADC state enters its waters.

The observer program has been effective. Nevertheless, it may be appropriate, initially for the orange roughy fishery.

=== Nauru ===
All foreign vessels licensed to fish or support fishing operations in Nauru waters are required to use an Automatic Location Communicator compatible and registered with the Regional Vessel Monitoring Systems serving the Pacific Islands Forum Fisheries Agency (FFA) and the Western and Central Pacific Fisheries Commission (WCPFC). Both Regional fisheries management organisations (RFMOs) are using the Vessel Monitoring System from Trackwell. Nauru has VMS data-sharing agreements with several other FFA member countries. A list of vessels licensed to fish in Nauru fisheries waters is uploaded daily to the FFA website.

=== Netherlands ===
The Netherlands has a nationwide VMS based on Inmarsat-C hardware. The system monitors 500 vessels. The VMS software is vTrack.

=== New Zealand ===
New Zealand has been running VMS since April 1994, with coverage out to the EEZ border under national and state agencies, with a target of 1000 vessels reporting every 2 hours. The national fisheries agency, a branch of the Ministry of Primary Industry, is responsible for the management of Fisheries located within the New Zealand EEZ. Vessels use either Argos or Inmarsat-C to report position every 2 hours

=== Norway ===
Norway requires VMS aboard all of its fishing vessels longer than 15 meters. Norway has established such a centre at the Directorate of Fisheries in Bergen. Norway currently has mutual tracking agreements with the EU, Russia, Iceland, the Faeroe Islands and Greenland.

=== Panama ===
When Panama joined the International Commission for the Conservation of Atlantic Tunas (ICCAT) in 1998, in response to an ICCAT embargo on bluefin tuna, it committed to require licensing and equipping deep sea fishing vessels with the Argo ELSA VMS.

=== Peru ===
Peru uses VMS to manage its anchovy fishery. For Peru fishing is a prime source of foreign exchange, second only to mining. Over 1000 fishing vessels are tracked in Peruvian waters by Argos. The Peruvian government implemented a national fishing Vessel Monitoring System (VMS) in 1998 to monitor and track all fishing vessels in its Exclusive Economic Zone. One of the first major VMS system's in the world, the system continues to operate today and is a reference for other countries wishing to implement similar fisheries management capabilities.

The country's anchovy fishing fleet, which seeks the Peruvian anchovy Engraulis ringens, is the world's largest single-species fishery, with an average of 8% of global landings.

For research, safety and monitoring purposes, vessels have the statutory obligation to use VMS, with industrial-scale fishing prohibited within 5 nautical miles (9.3 kilometres) from the coast.

=== Poland ===
Poland has a nationwide VMS based on Inmarsat-C hardware. The VMS software is vTrack.

=== Russia ===
The Russian Federation has an integrated system called SSM, for fisheries resource monitoring and has implemented a sectoral system for monitoring of the aquatic living resources, and for surveillance and control over the activities of the fishing vessels (SSM). SSM includes VMS monitoring of vessel positions.

SSM headquarters is in Moscow, with regional monitoring centers in Murmansk and Petropavlovsk-Kamchatskiy. The national system covers approximately 3800 vessels. Bilateral agreements exist with Faroes, Greenland Iceland, Japan, and Norway. Russia participates in the NAFO, NEAFC, and CCALMR multinational agreements. It regards SSM as integral to safety of navigation and SOLAS. Russia has bilateral agreements with Japan. AMS builds a Russian VMS.

==== Kamchatka Region ====
This covers the Pacific Ocean and the eastern Arctic Sector.

==== Murmansk Region ====
The Murmansk region covers Russian vessels in the Atlantic Ocean, the Azov, Black and Caspian Sea regions, and the western Arctic Sector/

=== Slovenia ===
Slovenia has a nationwide VMS based on Inmarsat-C hardware. The system monitors 8 vessels. The VMS software is vTrack.

=== South Africa ===
Fisheries management, including limited VMS, is under the Marine and Coastal Management (MCM) organization in the Department of Environmental Affairs and Tourism. Hake Merluccius spp.) trawl fishery is the mainstay of South Africa's fishing industry, and the center of regulatory efforts. On-board observers had been the mainstay of monitoring, rather than VMS.

VMS is aboard many vessels with reporting to an FMC in Cape Town that is equipped with BlueFinger's VMS software. Additional VMS will go onto vessels into more distant waters, such as hake longliners. VMS is seen as a management, a research, and a safety tool. South Africa is exploring correlating its VMS with:

- RadarSat off Prince Edward Island, possibly in lieu of patrol vessels there,
- Airborne Synthetic Aperture Radar for quick-look surveillance and coverage out to the edge of the EEZ.
- Coastrad, a system of linked coastal radars for monitoring specific vessels, as verifying that foreign fishing vessels conducting innocent passage do that, rather than fish
- Patrol vessels to back up all other sensors.

=== South Korea ===
The Korean Squid Fishing Association has 102 fishing vessels which are to be equipped with an Argos satellite transmitter for their fishing campaigns in Russia.

=== Suriname ===
CLS/Argos is under the Ministry of Agriculture, Farming and Fisheries, and was initially deployed on over 80 vessels.

=== Sweden ===
Sweden has a nationwide VMS established in 1998 and based on Inmarsat-C. The system is operated 24/7 by Havs- och vattenmyndigheten (The Swedish Agency for Marine and Water Management) and monitors all fishing vessels >= 12 m LoA. Number of vessels being monitored: 184 [2013-05-22]. These vessels use electronic fishing logbook and the reports are automatically transmitted via mobile internet close to shore and via the VMS-equipment further out at sea. No exemptions from VMS and electronic fishing logbook are allowed for the time being.

=== United Kingdom ===
In the UK recently new requirements have been introduced through both EU and National Legislation requiring the use of VMS to monitor fishing fleets for both fishing effort as well as address the protection of Marine habitats. Parallel to this the EU has also introduced the use of electronic logbooks, which replaces the traditional use of paper records. The UK fishing authorities are made up of the Welsh Government, Department of Agriculture & Rural Development Northern Ireland, Isle of Man Department for Environment Fisheries & Agriculture, Marine Scotland, Marine Management Organisation and the Channel Island Authorities.

EU and National reporting schemes are defined thus: National VMS reporting schemes: These are fishing vessel position reporting requirements that form part of management schemes set up by one or more UKFAs to control certain fisheries and marine conservation areas. Commonly referred to as 'National VMS reporting', it uses both satellite and GPRS/GSM communication services depending on the Legislative requirements. Two schemes are currently operational: for Northern Ireland Mussel Dredging and Isle of Man Scallop Fisheries. EU VMS reporting scheme: these are fishing vessel position reporting requirements, through satellite communication services only, that enables the authorities to track the position of fishing vessels, as set out in EU Regulations. It is commonly referred to as 'EU VMS reporting'. In addition, electronic logbook requirements are defined thus: catch and effort recording in 'real time' but as a minimum every 24hrs whilst a fishing vessel is at sea. Catch and effort data can be transmitted over whichever communication channel is available (i.e., if the Satellite Communication Service is unavailable, connection will be attempted via GPRS/GSM and vice versa). Electronic logbooks are commonly referred to as 'E-logbooks' and the end to end process and accompanying software is referred to as 'Elogbook Software System' or ELSS. In order to address this challenge the UK fishing authorities teamed up with Applied Satellite Technology Ltd (AST Ltd) in 2012 to come up with a combined solution. The resulting solution was the VMS Plus device, which has the capability to deliver all of these requirements through one device and is now being rolled out to the UK fishing fleet. In summary, the VMS Plus device meets the following functional requirements in full:

• Position reporting in accordance with the EU VMS regulatory requirements;

• Position reporting in accordance with relevant National Regulations governing marine protected and other special conservation areas at sea;

• Polling to request current and/or past positions from the device. The VMS Plus device has its own internal GPS used for position reporting and therefore is a useful cross referencing tool enabling fishing authorities to cross reference VMS positional data with other sources of positional data such as electronic logbooks;

• Separate access to communication services in the device, for other on-board systems, which as a minimum allow an on-board system using any UK fishing authority approved E-logbook Software to transmit E-logbook reports to, and receive acknowledgements from the UK fishing authorities.

=== Tunisia ===
Tunisian fisheries department have developed a Vessel Monitoring System (VMS) based on GPS position measurement and INMARSAT-C satellite communications. Tunisian's VMS solution provides pertinent information on the fishing fleet activities that help the Fisheries Monitoring Center (FMC) to manage the fishing vessels and control the living sea resources and fishing productions.

=== United States ===
In the U.S., national fisheries management is under the National Oceanographic and Atmospheric Administration's (NOAA) Fisheries Service. There may also be state fisheries regulators. The U.S. has a nationwide VMS monitoring a total of approximately 4,500 vessels based on the vTrack software.

==== Nationally-defined Fisheries VMS ====
At the national level, the goals include:

- Days at sea
- Electronic logbooks (at-sea catch reporting of species of interest)
- Area closures based on total allowable catch
- Spatial analysis of catch
- Measure compliance with restricted fishing areas, both domestic and international
- Area-specific quota management
- Measure compliance with EEZ boundaries by foreign vessels operating under settlement conditions

===== Northeast Region =====
This region consists of the Northeast Region includes marine waters off U.S. states of Maine, New Hampshire, Massachusetts, Rhode Island, Connecticut, New York, New Jersey, Pennsylvania, Delaware, Maryland, Virginia, North Carolina. Approximately 600 vessels are under VMS, with growth expected to 2500. VMS, operational since 1998, has been a significant tool in detecting trespass into closed areas by scallop and multispecies vessels, Days-at-Sea (DAS) violations, and fish landings that exceed trip limits (particularly in the cod and general category scallop fisheries). Numerous catch seizures and closed area violation prosecutions have been made solely from VMS data.

VMS is a basic tool in calculating DAS for the multispecies or DAS fisheries. Whenever a VMS fails to transmit an hourly function, it will be charged a DAS, unless the preponderance of evidence demonstrates that the failure to transmit was due to an unavoidable malfunction or disruption of the transmission, or was not at sea.

Fisheries of interest include:

- Scallop (dredge)
- Northeast multispecies (trawl, gillnet, hook gear)
- Monkfish (trawl, gillnet)
- Herring (trawl)
- Cod

===== Southeast Region =====
The Southeast Region includes marine waters off U.S. states of North Carolina, South Carolina, Georgia, Florida, Alabama, Mississippi, Louisiana, and Texas, as well as US waters around Puerto Rico and the US Virgin Islands.

Fisheries monitored by VMS

- Rock shrimp endorsement holders (trawl)
- Highly migratory species, or HMS (pelagic longline)
- Shark (gillnet and bottom longline gear)
- Penalty fleet (vessels subject to VMS monitoring as a penalty for violating fisheries regulations)
- Reef fish

269 vessels monitored by VMS

Skymate VMS is not approved for reef fish.

===== Northwest =====
The Northwest Region includes marine waters off U.S. states of Washington, Oregon and California.

- Rockfish Conservation Areas (RCAs): large-scale depth-based areas for stock preservation
- Cowcod Conservation Areas (CCAs): areas of previous overfishing
- Yelloweye Rockfish Conservation Area (YRCA): for another overfished species

The Pacific Coast vessel monitoring program consists of declaration reports and a vessel monitoring system. The declaration reports must be filed leaving port, and must identify:

- the vessel operator's intent to fish within an RCA,
- the gear type will be used for fishing,
- the fishery they are participating in.

Declaration reports are only necessary for fisheries that are allowed within a closed area and before a vessel intends to fish.

===== Southwest =====
Salmon-related issues remain the priority.

===== Alaska =====
Argos CLS is approved in this region.

===== Pacific Islands =====
Argos and Inmarsat-C are approved. The Pacific Islands Region includes waters around U.S. islands of Hawaii, Guam, Northern Mariana Islands, American Samoa, Wake Island, Midway Island, Howland and Baker Islands, Kingman Reef and Palmyra Atoll, Johnston Island and Jarvis Island. Approximately 200 vessels have VMS.

- Pelagic longline
- Northwestern Hawaiian Islands lobster trap
- American Samoa alia (small vessel longline, pilot project)
- Tuna purse seine (operating under South Pacific Tuna Treaty)
- Krill trawl (operating under CCAMLR)
- Foreign longline, pole and line (operating according to terms of court-ordered settlement agreements resulting from violations of US fishery law)

The Vessel Monitoring System used by the Pacific Islands Forum Fisheries Agency (FFA) is provided by Trackwell.

==== Highly migratory species in multiple regions ====
The VMS for HMS consists of both the mobile transceiver unit placed on the vessel and the communications service provider that supplies the wireless link between the unit on the vessel and the shoreside data user.

In the HMS Fisheries, the vessel owner is required to procure both VMS components. The two VMS components may, or may not, be provided by a single vendor. Thus, the vessel owner may need to procure the mobile transceiver unit and the mobile communications service separately.

VMS transmit vessel information primarily via INMARSAT satellites. They receive time and position data from the GPS constellation.

=== Uruguay ===
The authorities are theMaritime Authority, Dirección de Marina Mercante (DIMAR), and the Fishery Authority, Dirección Nacional de Recursos Pesqueros (DINARA). Uruguay licenses vessels for:

1. Hake Merluccius hubbsi on the continental shelf of the Uruguayan-Argentine Common Fishing Zone in depth more than 50 meters
2. white croaker Micropogonias furnieri and sea trout Cynoscion guatucupa, fishing in the coastal zone less than 50 meters depth in the La Plata River and the Uruguayan-Argentine common fishing zone
3. Various vessels different from 1 and 2, that can fish in Uruguayan waters.
4. Various vessels that fish in international waters. At present these vessels are fishing in FAO statistical area 41, CCAMLR 88.1 and 48.3, and the Pacific Ocean.

== See also ==
- IEEE Intelligent Transportation Systems Society

== Main reference ==
- Nolan, Conor P. (Ed.) (1999) Proceedings of the International Conference on Integrated Fisheries Monitoring Sydney, Australia 1–5 February 1999. Originated by Fisheries and Aquaculture Department: FAO.
