= List of Panama-flagged cargo ships =

This list of Panama-flagged cargo ships consists of vessels which are registered in Panama and subject to the laws of that country. Panama is the world's most prolific flag state by both tonnage and number of ships; over 8,065 ships accounting for almost 23% of the world's DWT fly the Panamanian flag, largely due to its status as a flag of convenience. A total of 4,721 bulk carriers, container ships, and general cargo ships flew the Panamanian flag in 2021. Any ship which flew the flag at any point in its career, and is present in the encyclopedia, is listed here.

== List of ships ==
Name	Owner	Country	Year built	Type	Notes
Belen Quezada			1884	Collier	First international "flag of convenience" vessel. Struck from registry in 1931, presumed scrapped
Ioannis Livanos	Zarati Steamship Co.		1918	Steamship	Last surviving White Star Line cargo ship. Scrapped in 1956
Volgo-Balt 214		Ukraine	1978	General cargo	Sank on 7 January 2019
Helt	Prima Shipping Group	Finland	1985	General cargo	Sunk by explosion in the Black Sea during the 2022 Russian invasion of Ukraine
Exxon Valdez	Exxon Shipping Company	United States	1986	Oil tanker	Beached in Prince William Sound, causing a major oil spill. Scrapped in 2012
MSC Sabrina	Mediterranean Shipping Company	International	1989	Container ship	Detained in Antwerp in 2017
Golden Nori	Dorval Kaiun Shipping	Japan	1997	Chemical tanker	Hijacked by pirates off the coast of Somalia on 28 October 2007
MV Matthew	Matthew Maritime	Marshall Islands	2001	Container ship	Detained in Cork in 2023
MOL Enterprise	Mitsui O.S.K. Lines	Japan	2003	Panamax container ship	Scrapped in 2017
MSC Carmen	Mediterranean Shipping Company	International	2005	Container ship	In active service
MSC Pamela	Mediterranean Shipping Company	International	2005	Container ship	In active service
Zelek Star	Fuden Shipping & Trading	Canada	2005	General cargo	Ran aground in 2013 and 2019. Refloated and under repairs
MSC Leigh	Mediterranean Shipping Company	International	2006	Container ship	In active service
MSC Monterey	Mediterranean Shipping Company	International	2007	Container ship	In active service
MSC Nuria	Mediterranean Shipping Company	International	2008	Container ship	In active service
MSC Rosaria	Mediterranean Shipping Company	International	2007	Container ship	In active service
NYK Vega	Nippon Yusen Ship Management	Japan	2006	Container ship	In active service
U-Sea Saskatchewan	Seavance Shipping	Canada	2010	Bulk carrier	In active service
U-Sea Colonsay	Seavance Shipping	Canada	2011	Panamax bulk carrier	In active service
Namura Queen	Nissen Kaiun	Japan	2020	Bulk carrier	Shelled during the 2022 Russian invasion of Ukraine
