= Interdiction of MV Matthew =

Cargo ship stormed by Irish Army Rangers

MV Matthew, a Panamanian-flagged, nominally Marshallese-owned bulk carrier, was interdicted and stormed by soldiers of the Irish Army Ranger Wing on 26 September 2023 after refusing to stop for the Irish Naval Service's LÉ William Butler Yeats. Matthew, known as MV Honmon until shortly before the incident, had been monitored for weeks based on information from the United States Drug Enforcement Administration as relayed through the Maritime Analysis and Operations Centre—Narcotics, and had apparently attempted to rendezvous with the Irish trawler Castlemore before Castlemore became trapped in a sandbank and Matthew experienced engine trouble. After Matthew moved erratically toward William Butler Yeats, the latter fired warning shots and Rangers took Matthew by force from a helicopter. The raid resulted in the seizure of 2,253 kilograms (4,967 lb) of South American cocaine, worth approximately €157 million, the largest drugs seizure in Irish history. At least nine arrests ensued, with one person subsequently released.

== Background ==
MV Honmon, a 190-metre-long (620 ft) bulk carrier built in 2001, with a clean slate from port states in the preceding 20 years, was bought by new owners in the summer of 2023. After a trip through the South China Sea, its owners changed its name to Matthew on 1 August. On 10 August, ownership was transferred from Seawin Marine to Matthew Maritime of the Marshall Islands, which intelligence analysts began to suspect was a shell company. United States, French, and Dutch agencies, among others, monitored the ship's activities in the Caribbean. On 18 or 19 August, it departed Curaçao with a stated destination of Gdańsk, Poland, apparently picking up cargo in Georgetown, Guyana, along the way. In this time, the United States Drug Enforcement Administration notified the Garda Síochána's National Drugs and Organised Crime Bureau of the impending cocaine shipment through the Maritime Analysis and Operations Centre—Narcotics.

Meanwhile, on 22 September, two men, both apparently not from Ireland and not familiar with boats, bought Castlemore, a fishing trawler, for perhaps €200,000 cash. According to TheJournal.ie, "the men got on board telling anyone that would listen to them that they were on their way to a fishing village in Devon on the south west coast of Britain".

== Interdiction ==
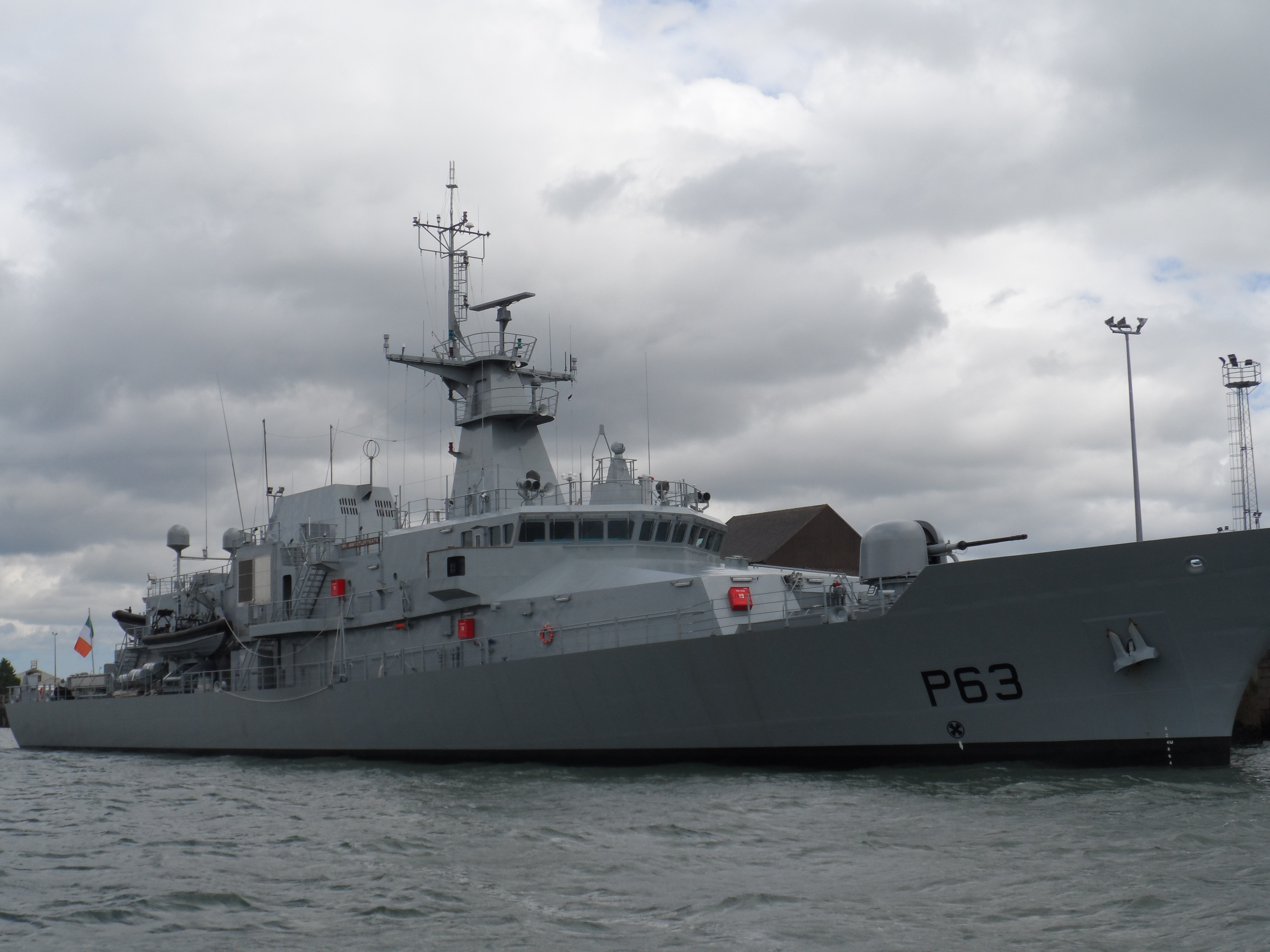
William Butler Yeats in 2016

Matthew, after changing its destination to Belfast, Northern Ireland, United Kingdom, entered the Republic of Ireland's territorial waters on 23 September, moving at a fairly high speed. A number of issues ensued: On 24 September, the ship changed course for Cork, Ireland, reporting engine troubles. That night, Castlemore ran aground on a sandbank in the dark. Its two crew members were rescued by an Irish Coast Guard (IRCG) helicopter in the early morning of 25 September, and were taken to the Irish Naval Service's LÉ William Butler Yeats, where they were arrested by Garda detectives. The same day, with Matthew off the coast of Waterford, its captain was medically evacuated by the IRCG, possibly as a result of a row among the crew.

Bereft of most of its cargo, Matthew was riding high in the water and was thus unstable. William Butler Yeats abandoned plans of a naval boarding and instead called for the assistance of the Army Ranger Wing, who were on standby. Pending the Rangers' arrival, William Butler Yeats drew closer to Matthew and attempted to stop it. After Matthew moved erratically, William Butler Yeats fired a single volley of machine gun fire across Matthew's bow.

Soon thereafter, Rangers fast-roped onto Matthew from an Irish Air Corps AW139 helicopter. Matthew crew members allegedly burned bales of cocaine as the Rangers boarded. The Rangers took control of the ship, overcoming resistance near the ship's bridge. A pilot then sailed it into Cork Harbour, to a crowd of awaiting onlookers.

== Investigation ==
Investigators found 2,253 kilograms (4,967 lb) of South American cocaine aboard Matthew, worth approximately €157 million, amounting to the largest drugs seizure in Irish history.

During and after the interdiction, Gardaí arrested nine people as of 30 September, of whom one was subsequently released, and interviewed all 25 crew members.

== Conviction ==
In July 2025, eight men of various nationalities were jailed, with sentences of between 13 and 20 years.

== Media ==
Cocaine Cargo is a Virgin Media documentary on the €157m MV Matthew drug seizure.

== See also ==
- Operation Seabight
- Illicit drug use in Ireland
