= MAOC =

MAOC or MaoC may refer to:

- Milicias Antifascistas Obreras y Campesinas, a militia group founded in the Second Spanish Republic in 1934
- Maritime Analysis and Operations Centre, an anti-drug trafficking agency active since 2006
- Enoyl-CoA hydratase 2 or MaoC, an enzyme
