= Operation Seabight =

2008 Irish anti-drug trafficking operation

- Date: 6–7 November 2008
- Location: Porcupine Seabight, Porcupine Bank
- Type: Law enforcement operation
- Target: Cocaine shipment, drug traffickers
- Perpetrators: Maritime Analysis and Operations Centre – Narcotics (MAOC-N), Irish Naval Service, Gardaí
- Organised by: MAOC-N
- Participants: Law enforcement personnel from Ireland, United Kingdom, Portugal, Spain, the Netherlands, France and Italy.
- Outcome: Seizure of cocaine, arrest and conviction of three individuals.
- Arrests: 3
- Convicted: 3
- Charges: Possession of cocaine knowing the drug was to be imported into a country other than Ireland.
- Verdict: Guilty
- Convictions: 3
- Sentence: 10 years each
- Largest cocaine haul in Irish history at the time (later surpassed). Yacht: Dances with Waves.

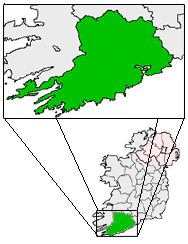
The seizure took place off the coast of County Cork, Ireland.

Operation Seabight, or Sea Bight, is the codename used to describe the tracking and eventual seizure of up to €750 million^{[a]}^{[b]} of cocaine off the Irish coast in November 2008, originally thought to have been the largest such haul in the history of Ireland and one of the largest in Europe in 2008. The figures were later revised to show that this was in fact the second largest haul in Irish history. The seizure took place off the south-west coast and eclipsed the discovery of €440 million of cocaine near Mizen Head in July 2007. A 60-foot (18 m) yacht containing more than seventy bales of the substance was seized by a team of European anti-drugs agencies led by Irish authorities. Three men were also apprehended and later each was sentenced to ten years in jail.

The seizure came just one day after the fourth man involved in Ireland's previous record haul in 2007 was sentenced to ten years imprisonment. 1.5 tonnes (1.7 short tons) of cocaine valued at €440 million washed up on the Cork coast near Mizen Head following an attempted trafficking scam that failed when one of the men filled their petrol-powered motor engine with diesel. The inflatable launch overturned and dumped sixty-two bales of cocaine into the sea. Three of the men involved in the operation were sentenced earlier in 2008 for a total of eighty-five years.

== Etymology ==
Operation Seabight received its name from the Porcupine Seabight, Porcupine Bank near international fishing grounds where the seizure took place.

== Background ==
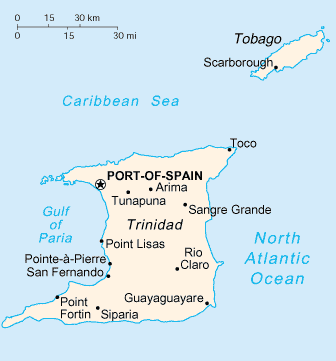
The yacht set sail from Trinidad before being seized off the south-western Irish coast.

The seizure was masterminded by the Lisbon-based anti-trafficking body, Maritime Analysis and Operations Centre – Narcotics (MAOC-N), which is staffed by law enforcement personnel from Ireland, United Kingdom, Portugal, Spain, the Netherlands, France and Italy. The centre targets aeroplanes and sea vessels, such as private ships, cruisers and yachts, mainly from South America, Latin America and West Africa. The operation has previously identified smuggling routes which use West Africa as a staging post for illegal substances before shipping them to Europe.

A 60-foot (18 m) yacht containing seventy bales of the substance was seized by a team of European anti-drugs agencies led by the Irish. The yacht, named Dances with Waves, had set sail from Trinidad more than a month earlier. MAOC-N tracked it across the Atlantic Ocean before the Irish Naval Service patrol ship LÉ Niamh moved in around 150 nautical miles (280 km; 170 mi) off the coast of West Cork at around 11:00 UTC on 6 November 2008.

The yacht, registered in Britain until July and then de-registered, was escorted into Castletownbere Harbour in West Cork by the Irish patrol ship LÉ Róisín early on 7 November 2008. Gardaí (the Irish police) removed the 70 bales of cocaine from the vessel and garda technical experts examined it. The haul was taken to local garda stations and later removed to the Department of Justice Forensic Science Laboratory at Garda Headquarters.

It later emerged that the yacht was on the verge of capsizing when naval officers swooped on the vessel, with the seventy bales almost being washed into the sea. Authorities were forced to board the ship in "horrendous weather conditions" to prevent a potential loss of evidence as 7-metre (23 ft) swells swirled in the background. The yacht was seized in the midst of a force seven gale which delayed its onshore arrival by seven hours.

The patrol ship LÉ Orla was deployed to search for bales of the drug while monitoring shipping to ensure they didn't recover any of the haul from the sea

== Substance ==
Initial tests indicate the cocaine seized is 80% pure, 5% more potent than the €440 million Dunlough Bay haul of 2007. According to one source, the average purity of Irish street cocaine is (presumably currently) just 10%, although an older source (data for 1999) states that cocaine purity across Europe is typically 55% to 70%, with Ireland being exceptionally low at 41%. Street prices for cocaine in both the US and Europe have dropped consistently over the last twenty years, indicating supply in this period has outstripped demand.

== Convicts ==
Three male British nationals, initially reported to be aged between 44 and 52, were detained and questioned by gardaí in two separate garda stations in Bantry and Bandon, County Cork. The men were taken ashore at the small fishing port of Castletownbere. The three, later named as 49-year-old Philip Doo and 40-year-old David Mufford (both from Devon, England) and 42-year-old Christopher Wiggins (with an address on Spain's Costa del Sol), appeared before a special sitting of the District Court in Clonakilty, County Cork on 8 November 2008. They were charged with possession of cocaine knowing the drug was to be imported into a country other than Ireland. No application for bail was made and the men were remanded in custody to appear in Kinsale court again on 13 November 2008.

The damaged yacht, believed bound for Liverpool, remains in Castletownbere. Searches of its logs, charts and navigation computers continue to find evidence that would prove its link to Spanish-based British drugs gang members. The bulk of the cocaine consignment was due for European markets.

The three men were each sentenced to ten years in jail on 8 May 2009.

== See also ==
- Interdiction of MV Matthew
- Illicit drug use in Ireland

== Notes ==
- ^a On 6 November 2008, €750 million was the equivalent of almost £ 609 million and a little over US$.
- ^b The €750 million figure was based on the usual law enforcement estimate for a sub-gram quantity heavily cut. Based on the estimated street value of €30–33,000 per kg, the 1875 kg would be worth anything from ≈ €56–60 million.
