= Office Central pour la Répression du Trafic Illicite des Stupéfiants =

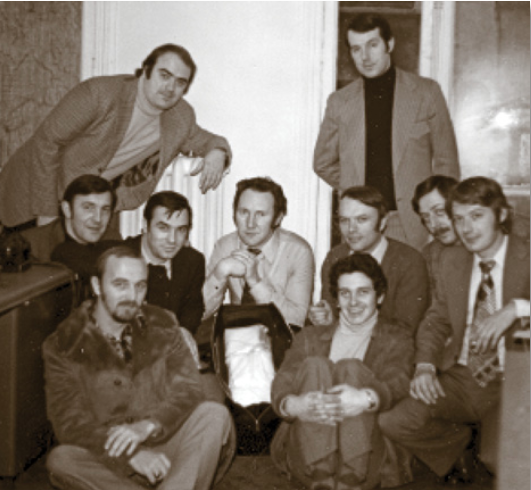
Members of OCRTIS and the American BNDD investigating the French Connection pose next to captured narcotics in Paris, 1971.

The Office Central pour la Répression du Trafic Illicite des Stupéfiants (OCRTIS) (transl. Central Office for the Repression of Illicit Drug Trafficking) is a cross agency and cross business department of the French judicial police. It is part of the sous-direction de la lutte contre la criminalité organisée et la délinquance financière. It was formed on 3 August 1953 in response to the 1936 treaty signed by the League of Nations.

== Organisation ==
It comprises police, gendarmes and customs officers. Its headquarters are in the Nanterre district of Paris and it has detachments in:

- Charles de Gaulle Airport
- French Caribbean
- Lille
- Marseille
- Bordeaux/Bayonne

== Mission ==
- Coordinate intelligence gathering to support investigations, prevention of drug trafficking
- Carry out investigations nationwide to identify and dismantle drug trafficking operations
- Provide technical support and expertise to local agencies
- Coordinate operations with Foreign Ministry, Defense ministry and Customs
- Provide drug related statistics to other Police departments
- Represent the French police in international bodies and liaise with Interpol and Europol.

== Resources ==
The office has access to the network of liaison officers of the Direction de la coopération internationale in drug producing countries and transit countries. The office also provides statistics and operational information through its OSIRIS system.

Officers participate in international agencies such as Maritime Analysis and Operations Centre, Centre de Coordination de la Lutte Anti-drogue en Méditerranée and regional intelligence exchange platforms in Africa.

== See also ==
- Maritime Analysis and Operations Centre
- Joint Interagency Task Force
