= Wintertide =

Wintertide may refer to:

- Winter, the coldest season of the year in temperate climates
- Wintertide (album), by Don Ross, 1996
- Wintertide, a 2007 album by Heather Alexander and Alexander James Adams
- Wintertide, a 1999 novel by Linnea Sinclair
- Wintertide, a 2010 novel from the Riyria Revelations series by Michael J. Sullivan
- Winter Tide, a 2017 novel by Ruthanna Emrys
- Wintertide, a United Kingdom-registered refrigerated ship which collided with MSC Sabrina in 2000

== See also ==
- Wintertime (film), a 1943 musical film starring Sonja Henie
