= Central Directorate of the Judicial Police =

French national judicial police

Logo of the Central Directorate of the Judicial Police

The Central Directorate of the Judicial Police (French: Direction centrale de la police judiciaire; DCPJ) is a directorate of the French National Police whose national and territorial responsibility is investigating and fighting serious crime. It was established in 1907 and later reorganized under an ordinance issued on 5 August 2009.

== Mission and responsibilities ==
The judicial police in France are responsible for fighting serious crime across the entire country. To oversee their operations, the Central Directorate was created in 1966 to oversee it. It manages central services with national authority, such as OCTRIS, OCLCO and SDAT. It also supervises regional directorates.

The Directorate is focused on the investigation of organized crime, terrorism, cybercrime, and other serious and complex forms of criminal behaviour in France.

Its responsibilities and focus evolved over time. In 2009, the following were directly mentioned:

- Crimes against persons and properties
- Missing persons
- Arms trafficking
- Fugitives
- International fraud
- Prostitution
- Art trafficking
- Stolen vehicles and documents
- Terrorism
- Drug trafficking
- Money laundering
- White-collar crime
- Counterfeiting
- Cybercrime

== Organisation ==
The DCPJ is itself divided into sub-directorates:

- The sous-direction de la lutte contre la criminalité organisée et la délinquance financière (SDLCODF) – Organised and financial crime sub-directorate.
- The sous-direction Anti-terroriste (SDAT) – Anti-terrorist sub-directorate.
- The sous-direction de la lutte contre la cybercriminalité – Cybercrime sub-directorate.
- The sous-direction de la police technique et scientifique (SDPTS) – Police Technical and Scientific sub-directorate.
- The sous-direction des ressources, de l'évaluation et de la stratégie (SDRES) – Resources, evaluations, and strategy sub-directorate.

A major part of the Police judiciaire (PJ) in France is actually composed by territorial services (DIPJ/DRPJ).

According to a report from the French Senate, as of July 2022, the DCPJ employed 5,673 personnel, including approximately 3,800 investigators.

== History ==
The first national judicial police was created in 1907 by Georges Clemenceau acting as Minister of the Interior, and Célestin Hennion. Before that, the police were local forces, and had trouble coping with new large gangs acting on broader areas, using cars and railways to move (while police had bicycles or horses). The 12 Brigades régionales de police mobile (Regional Brigades of Mobile Police), based in major cities with large jurisdictions had a total of 500 officers. They were well-trained, operated 24/7 surveillance of suspects, used the Bertillon system, had telephones and quickly got cars. The brigades achieved notable results, including the arrest of the infamous Bonnot Gang. As Georges Clemenceau was nicknamed "Le Tigre" (tiger), the units became known as Brigades du Tigre (Tiger Squad) and were later featured in Les Brigades du Tigre. Nowadays the logo of the DCPJ figures a tiger and the silhouette of Clemenceau.

== See also ==
- French National Police
- Direction Régionale de Police Judiciaire de Paris
