= International organization membership of Portugal =

The following is a list of international organizations in which Portugal officially participates.

== Memberships ==
- European Space Agency (ESA)
- International Energy Agency (IEA)
- International Atomic Energy Agency (IAEA)
- Multilateral Investment Guarantee Agency (MIGA)
- International Development Association (IDA)
- International Seabed Authority (ISA)
- European Bank for Reconstruction and Development (EBRD)
- International Bank for Reconstruction and Development (IBRD)
- Bank for International Settlements (BIS)
- International Bureau of Weights and Measures (BIPM)
- International Centre for Settlement of Investment Disputes (ICSID)
- Council of Europe (CE)
- United Nations Regional Information Centre (UNRIC)
- International Transport Forum (ITF)
- Hague Conference on Private International Law (HCCH)
- United Nations Conference on Trade and Development (UNCTAD)
- International Commission on Civil Status (ICCS)
- European Atomic Energy Community (EURATOM)
- Community of Portuguese Language Countries (CPLP)
- Conference of the Translation Services of the European States (COTSOES)
- Ibero-American Sports Council (CID)
- International Council for the Exploration of the Sea (ICES)
- World Customs Organization (WCO)
- International Fund for Agricultural Development (IFAD)
- International Monetary Fund (IMF)
- United Nations Children’s Fund (UNICEF)
- International Institute for Democracy and Electoral Assistance (International IDEA)
- International Institute for the Unification of Private Law (UNIDROIT)
- European University Institute (EUI)
- European Molecular Biology Laboratory (EMBL)
- Maritime Analysis and Operations Centre – Narcotics (MAOC (N))
- Food and Agriculture Organization (FAO)
- International Civil Aviation Organization (ICAO)
- Organisation for Economic Co-operation and Development (OECD)
- North Atlantic Treaty Organization (NATO)
- Organization of Ibero-American States (OEI)
- European Organisation for the Exploitation of Meteorological Satellites (EUMETSAT)
- European Southern Observatory (ESO)
- European Patent Organisation (EPOrg)
- European Organization for Nuclear Research (CERN)
- European Organisation for the Safety of Air Navigation (EUROCONTROL)
- European Telecommunications Satellite Organization (Eutelsat IGO)
- International Hydrographic Organization (IHO)
- Ibero-American Youth Organization (OIJ)
- Intergovernmental Organisation for International Carriage by Rail (OTIF)
- International Cocoa Organization (ICCO)
- United Nations (UN)
- International Coffee Organization (ICO)
- International Mobile Satellite Organization (IMSO)
- International Jute Organization (IJO)
- International Tropical Timber Organization (ITTO)
- International Organization of Legal Metrology (OIML)
- International Organization for Migration (IOM)
- International Criminal Police Organization – INTERPOL (ICPO–INTERPOL)
- International Telecommunications Satellite Organization (ITSO)
- International Labour Organization (ILO)
- International Organisation of Vine and Wine (OIV)
- International Maritime Organization (IMO)
- World Meteorological Organization (WMO)
- World Trade Organization (WTO)
- World Intellectual Property Organization (WIPO)
- World Health Organization (WHO)
- World Tourism Organization (UN Tourism)
- United Nations Industrial Development Organization (UNIDO)
- United Nations Educational, Scientific and Cultural Organization (UNESCO)
- Organisation for the Prohibition of Chemical Weapons (OPCW)
- Organization for Security and Co-operation in Europe (OSCE)
- Comprehensive Nuclear-Test-Ban Treaty Organization (CTBTO)
- World Organisation for Animal Health (WOAH)
- Ibero-American General Secretariat (SEGIB)
- International Finance Corporation (IFC)
- International Criminal Court (ICC)
- Permanent Court of Arbitration (PCA)
- European Union (EU)
- Inter-Parliamentary Union (IPU)
- International Union for Conservation of Nature (IUCN)
- International Telecommunication Union (ITU)
- Latin Union (UL)
- Postal Union of the Americas, Spain and Portugal (UPAEP)
- Universal Postal Union (UPU)
- African Development Bank (AfDB) (nonregional member)
- Asian Development Bank (ADB) (nonregional member)
- Inter-American Development Bank (IDB) (extraregional member)
- Latin American Integration Association (LAIA / ALADI) (observer)
- Organization of American States (OAS) (observer)
- Latin American and Caribbean Economic System (SELA) (observer)
- African Union (AU) (observer)

== See also ==
- Ministry of Foreign Affairs (Portugal)
- Foreign relations of Portugal
- List of diplomatic missions of Portugal
