= Canpotex =

Canadian potash exporting and marketing firm

Canpotex Limited
- Company type: Private
- Industry: Exporting and marketing
- Founded: 1972
- Headquarters: Saskatoon, Saskatchewan, Canada
- Area served: Worldwide
- Key people: Gordon McKenzie President and Chief Executive Officer
- Products: Potash
- Owner: The Mosaic Company, and Nutrien Ltd.
- Number of employees: 135 (2022)
- Website: www.canpotex.com

Canpotex, short for Canadian Potash Exporters (reporting mark PTEX), is a Canadian potash exporting and marketing firm, incorporated in 1970 and operating since 1972. Based in Saskatchewan, Canpotex manages the entire Saskatchewan potash exporting industry (excluding Canadian and US sales), including transportation and delivery.

Canpotex is the world's largest exporter of potash, selling over 13 million tonnes of potash every year, representing about one-third of global capacity. The global potash market was considered a duopoly between Canpotex and Belarusian Potash Company (BPC), a similar consortium which exported Belarusian (Belaruskali) and Russian potash (Uralkali); until the BPC marketing venture failed in 2013, the two collectively controlled 70% of global potash exports.

== History ==
Canpotex's predecessor was Canada's Potash Conservation Board. The Board was established in 1969, which was a time when prices were dropping significantly in the North American potash market, and the Board's goal was to limit production and establish minimum prices.

== Member producers ==
Canpotex is wholly owned by its two Shareholders:

- The Mosaic Company 50%
- Nutrien 50%

== Facilities ==
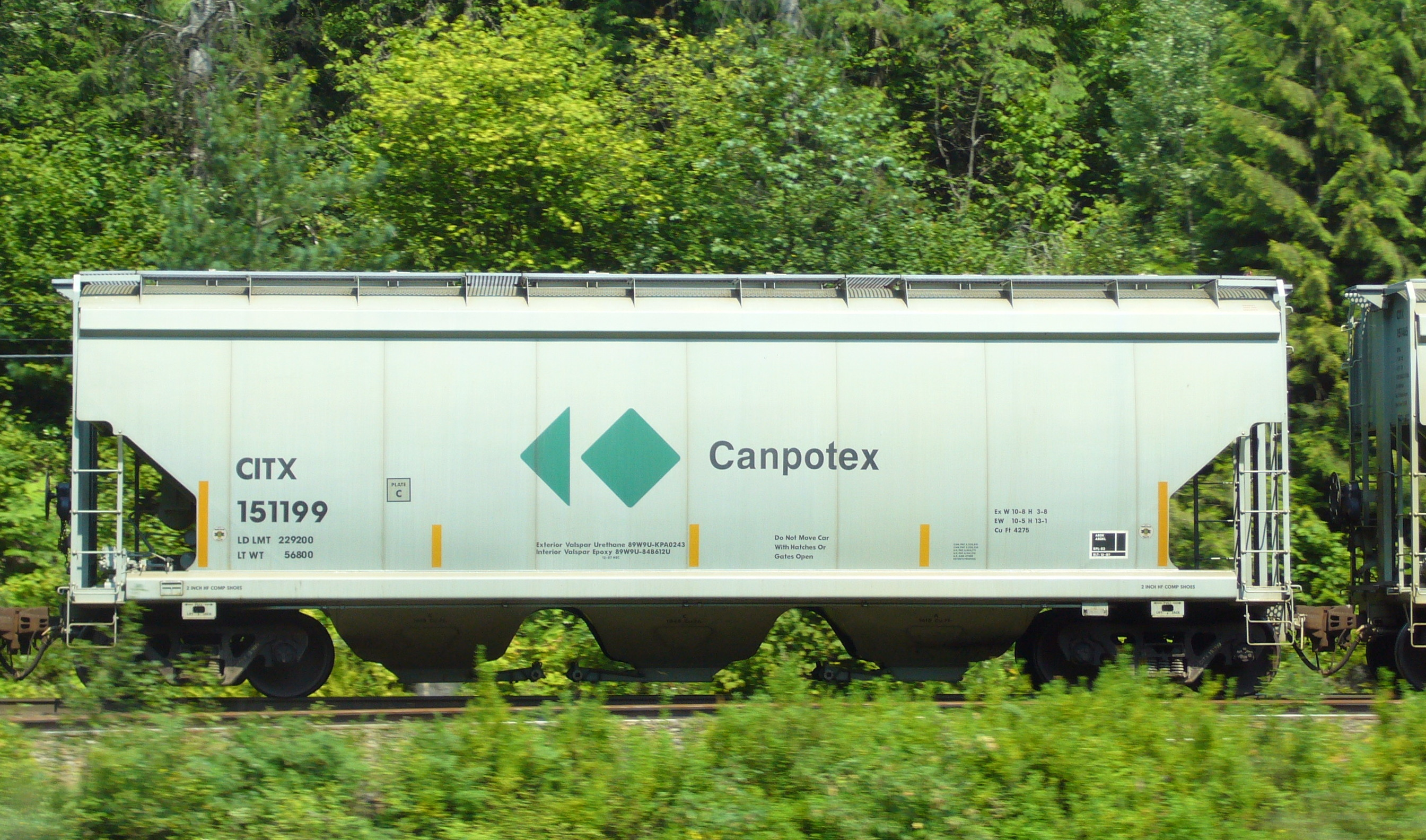
The majority of Canpotex potash is shipped to west coast terminals via CPR lines, in dedicated covered hopper railway cars

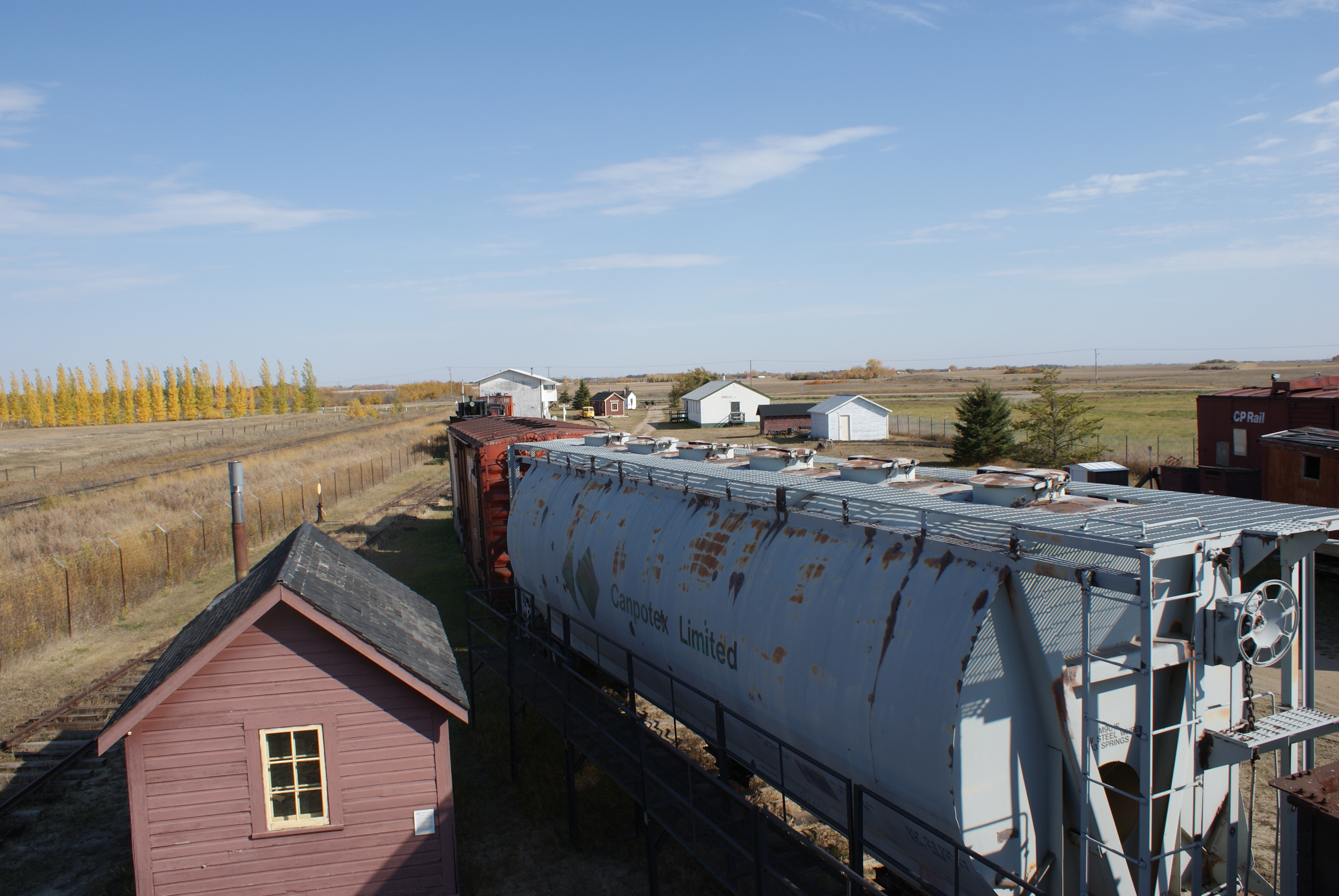
Canpotex cylindrical hopper on display at the Saskatchewan Railway Museum.

Canpotex has commissioned over 8,000 specialized covered hopper cars for inland transportation of potash from landlocked Saskatchewan to ports, and operates solely on Canadian Pacific Railway lines. In 2011, Canpotex started on the construction of a new $55 million rail car maintenance yard near the town of Lanigan, Saskatchewan used to perform maintenance and manage the inventory of railcars.

The majority of its potash is shipped overseas to Asian, Latin American, and Oceanic markets through Neptune Terminals, partly owned by Canpotex, in North Vancouver, British Columbia. Since 1997, Canpotex has additionally exported through Portland Terminals (owned by Canpotex and operated by Kinder Morgan) in Portland, Oregon. Canpotex additionally ships smaller quantities of potash through the St. Lawrence Seaway via Thunder Bay, Ontario, and has access to ports on the East Coast of the United States and Gulf of Mexico.

== Ships ==
Canpotex has committed $900 million to the manufacture of 15 cargo vessels. The first of these vessels, the U-Sea Saskatchewan, built as a joint venture with Ultrabulk received its first load of 58,000 metric tons of potash in the Port of Vancouver in November 2010. The U-Sea Saskatchewan was built by Imabari Shipbuilding of Japan and is capable of carrying 60,000 metric tons. Other ships include the Ultra Colonsay.
