= Cannabis in Ireland =

Legality of cannabis in Europe Legal for recreational use by adults Legal for medical use under certain conditions by adults Illegal

Cannabis in Ireland is illegal for recreational purposes. Use for medical purposes requires case-by-case approval by the Minister for Health. A bill to legalise medical uses of cannabis passed second reading in Dáil Éireann (lower house) in December 2016, but was rejected by the Oireachtas Health Committee in 2017.

== History ==
In the Irish Free State, cannabis and cannabis resin were first prohibited by the Dangerous Drugs Act 1934, which came into force on 1 April 1937. The 1934 act replaced the Dangerous Drugs Act 1920 (10 & 11 Geo. 5. c. 46) (a UK act passed before the Free State's creation) and fulfilled the state's obligations under the 1925 revision of the Second International Opium Convention, which had added Indian hemp to the list of controlled substances, and which was ratified by the Free State in 1931.

Cannabis use increased from the late 1960s. In 1968 the government set up a Working Party on Drug Abuse, whose 1971 report recommended keeping "the legal and medical status of cannabis" under review, and that possession of "a small amount of cannabis" for personal use should not be punished by imprisonment. The recommendation to place cannabis in a separate legal category from other narcotics was included in the Misuse of Drugs Act 1977, which replaced the 1934 act, and remains in force.

== Enforcement ==
The gardaí (Irish police) have a level of discretion when dealing with recreational cannabis users. To procure a conviction any cannabis seized has to be sent for analysis to the Garda Forensic Science Laboratory. This, along with the time needed to process the arrest, means that individual gardaí may decide not to arrest for small amounts, but the drug will be seized and the name of the individual will be taken. Possession of cannabis is an arrestable offense and in 2003, 53 per cent of all drug seizures and 70 per cent of all drug-related prosecutions were for cannabis. Trafficking or possession with intent to supply are serious offenses under Irish law, punishable by fines of up to €2500 and/or a prison sentence up to a year in length.

75% of drug cases before the criminal courts are for simple possession. This accounted for 11,486 of the convictions in 2016.

On being brought to court, the penalties for possession are outlined as follows:

- First offence: On summary conviction, to a fine not exceeding €381, or on conviction on indictment, to a fine not exceeding €635.
- Second offence: On summary conviction, to a fine not exceeding €508, or on conviction on indictment, to a fine not exceeding €1,269.
- Third or subsequent offence: On summary conviction, to a fine not exceeding €1,269 or, at the discretion of the court, to imprisonment for a term not exceeding twelve months, or to both the fine and the imprisonment, or on conviction on indictment, to a fine of such amount as the court considers appropriate or, at the discretion of the court, to imprisonment for a term not exceeding three years, or to both the fine and the imprisonment. There is no law against possession or sale of cannabis seeds.

== Medical use ==
The 1998 regulations under the Misuse of Drugs Act 1977 (as amended) listed cannabis, cannabis resin, cannabinol and its derivatives as Schedule 1 drugs. For such drugs, manufacture, production, preparation, sale, supply, distribution and possession is unlawful for any purpose, except under licence from the Minister for Health. Licences were granted to GW Pharmaceuticals in 2002 and 2003 to allow medical trials of the cannabis extract nabiximols (Sativex) in a county Cork hospice and Waterford Regional Hospital. In 2014, the 1998 regulations were amended to allow nabiximols to be prescribed by excepting it from schedule 1. The first licence for medical use of cannabis oil was issued in December 2016 to allow Tristan Forde, a two-year-old boy with Dravet syndrome, to continue treatment begun in Colorado. This was issued by the minister after an application by the boy's physician.

== Reform ==
=== 2010–2019 ===
A community of anonymous cannabis users who reside in Ireland was created under the name Crainn (Irish for "trees") in 2010 as a subreddit on the platform Reddit. In September 2021 it set up a board of directors to "get organised and to help communicate to politicians what we want" and has expanded to other online platforms, such as a Discord server which was established in 2017. The organisation has three core pillars: normalisation, education and community. As of January 2022 it had 28,000 members in its subreddit, r/Crainn. By September 2024, this had risen to over 42,000. The organisation has taken part in a number of demonstrations, debates and educational campaigns.

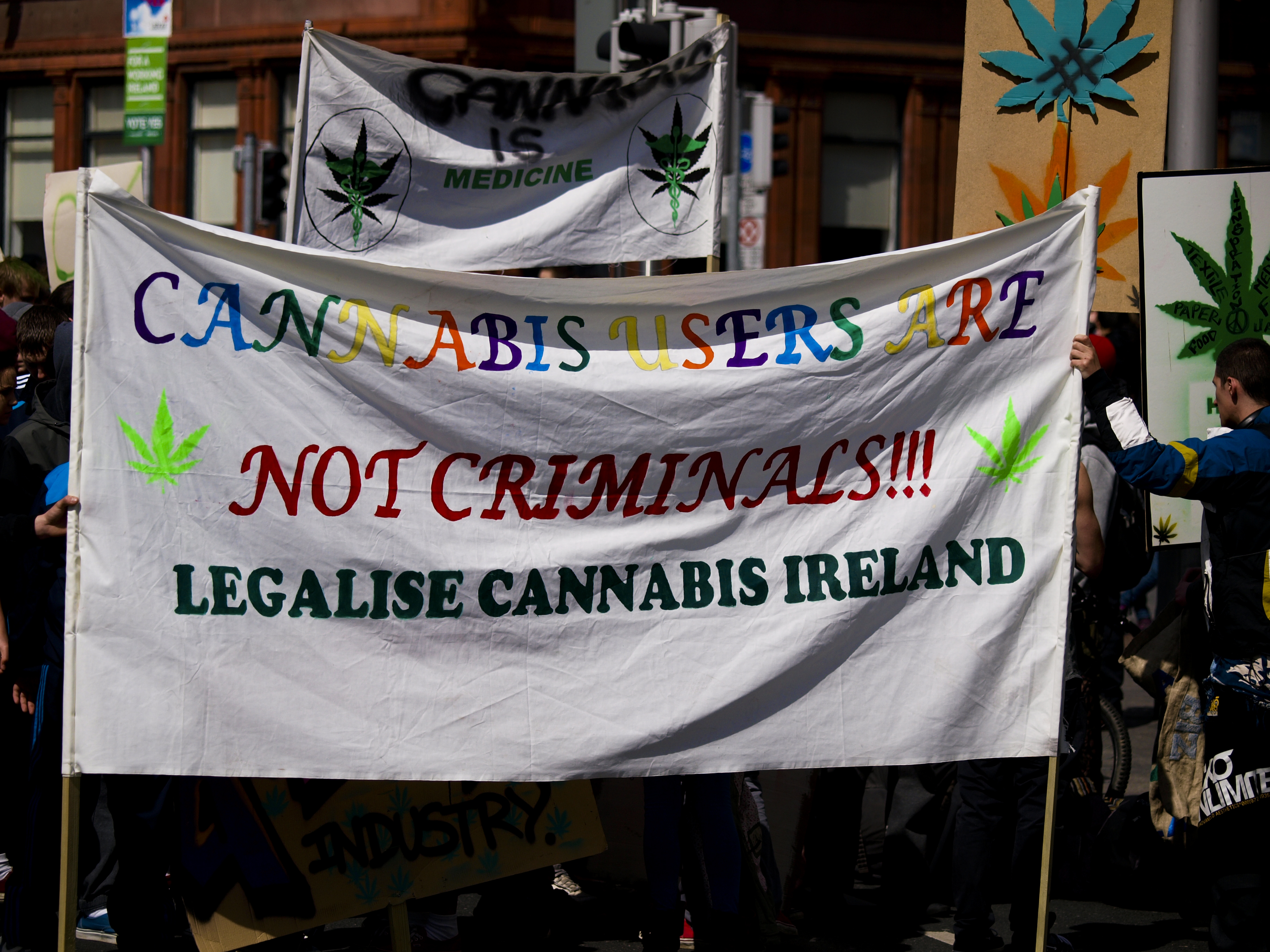
A march in Dublin calling for the legalisation of cannabis in Ireland in May 2012

Luke 'Ming' Flanagan, a longstanding pro-cannabis campaigner, was elected to the 31st Dáil in the 2011 general election as an independent TD for Roscommon–South Leitrim. On 6 November 2013, he proposed a motion "That Dáil Éireann calls on the Government to introduce legislation to regulate the cultivation, sale and possession of cannabis and cannabis products in Ireland", which was defeated by 111 votes to 8. On 20 November 2013, he introduced a private member's bill, the Cannabis Regulation Bill 2013, which never got a second reading.

In November 2015, Aodhán Ó Ríordáin, then Minister of State responsible for the National Drugs Strategy, said he favoured decriminalising cannabis for personal use, and in 2017 called for the legalisation of cannabis to "cut the knees from under drug gangs". Ó Ríordáin lost his Dáil seat at the 2016 election but was reelected in 2020.

In December 2016, a private member's bill was introduced by Gino Kenny of People Before Profit to make cannabis available in Ireland for medicinal use. The bill, supported by People Before Profit, Sinn Féin, the Labour Party, the Social Democrats, the Green Party and the Independent Alliance, passed second stage without a vote. The bill progressed to the amendments stage on 9 November 2017, but was later rejected by the Oireachtas Health Committee.

In a 2017 interview with Hot Press magazine, Fianna Fáil TD Stephen Donnelly spoke about smoking cannabis. After being announced as a minister in the 2020 cabinet, Donnelly reportedly stood by his 2017 comments, and noted an openness to the liberalisation of some drug laws, stating that if "you're doing something that's not harming anybody else, it's hard to see a legitimate role for the State in prosecuting you for it". A 2020 news article described Donnelly as "broadly supportive" of supervised injection centres and open to making cannabis legal.

In June 2018, after a bill was passed to legalise cannabis in Canada, Taoiseach Leo Varadkar stated that the decriminalisation of cannabis was 'under consideration', with an expert group considering the examining the systems in jurisdictions in which cannabis has been decriminalised for recreational use.

=== 2020–present ===
In a 2020 interview, Green Party health spokesperson, Ossian Smyth said that he raised the proposition of legalising drugs during government negotiations, but added: “Fine Gael and Fianna Fáil said no.”

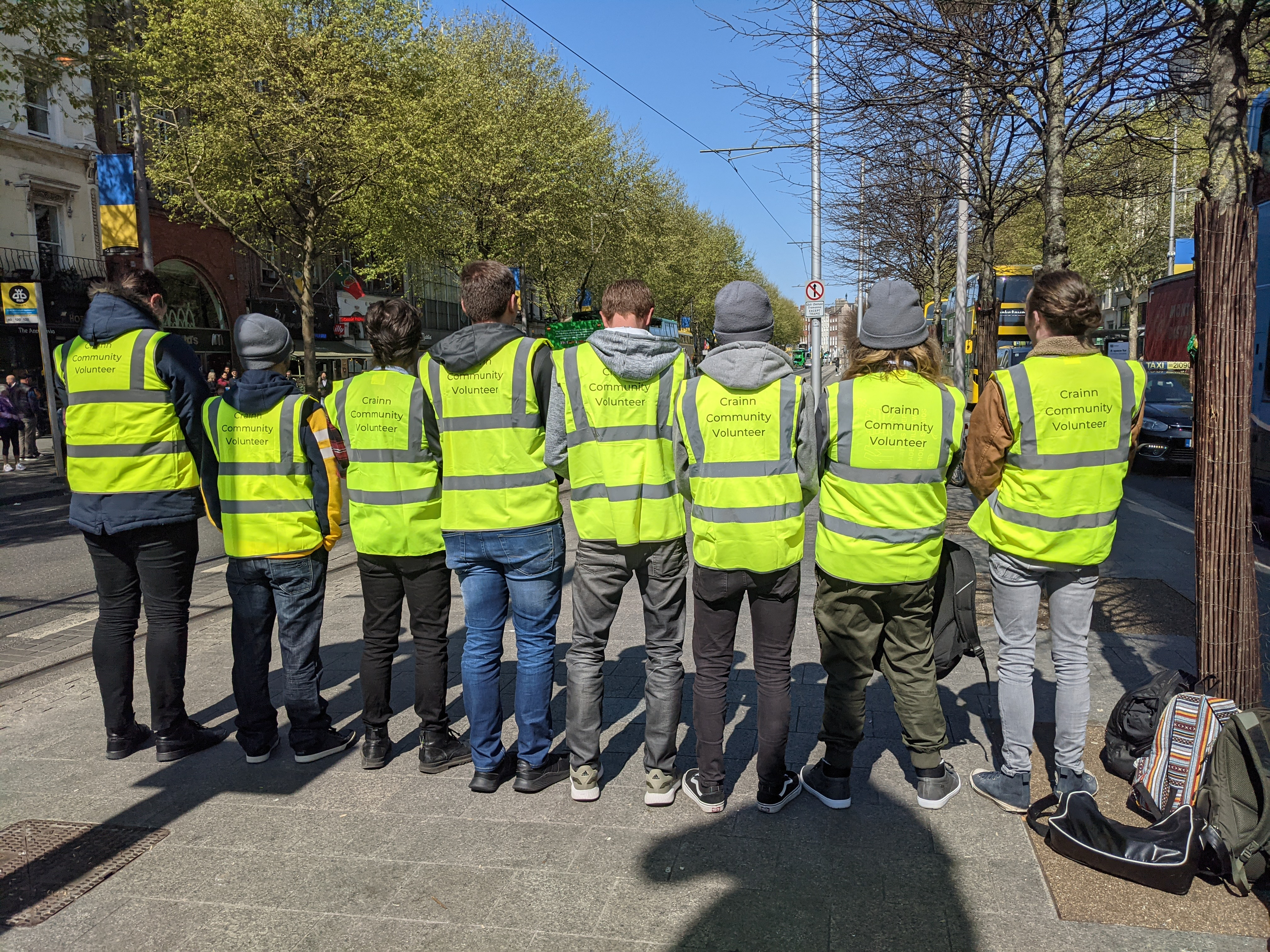
Volunteering members of the Crainn community taking part in the first ever 'Cannabis Information Day', Dublin, April 2022

In November 2022, Gino Kenny introduced a bill to legalise personal usage of cannabis, and possession of up to seven grams (¼ oz) of cannabis.

In April 2022, cannabis activists took part in a number of campaigns across Dublin City. The organisation known as Crainn held a 'first-of-its-kind' information day in which campaigners wore hi-vis jackets and educated the public on cannabis. Other activist groups such as the Major Group For Cannabis Reform (MGCR) held rallies and marches through the streets, supported by Gino Kenny TD.

In early December 2022, an Irish legislative body, made up of Irish politicians, known as the 'Joint Committee on Justice' published a report titled " An Examination of the present approach to sanctions for possession of certain amounts of drugs for personal use" that recommended that the government decriminalise drugs such as cannabis, and consider legalising them. The report itself was influenced by advocacy groups and experts such as Patients for Safe Access, Crainn, Dr. Garret McGovern, Dr. Bobby Smyth and Dr. Nuno Capaz.

In 2022 and 2023, Ireland was hit with a wave of synthetic cannabis hospitalisations. In light of this, activist group Crainn spoke to the press and said that this was due to "the lack of regulation around cannabis" and that "it is only a matter of time before we see a synthetic cannabis related death in Ireland".

In February 2023, Government Minister Hildegarde Naughton told the media that she had smoked cannabis in her 20s, and that it "wasn't for her".

== Citizens' Assembly on Drugs Use ==
In February of 2023, the Irish government established a Citizens' Assembly to look at issues relating to drugs use in April of 2023. A small, informal cross-party group of 'like-minded' TDs and senators had worked together to push the issue forward, including Holly Cairns of the Social Democrats, Aodhán Ó Ríordáin of Labour, Paul McAuliffe of Fianna Fáil, Neasa Hourigan of the Green Party, Gino Kenny of People Before Profit and independent senators Lynn Ruane and Eileen Flynn. Sinn Féin are not members of this group. Some members of the group have called for the decriminalisation and legalisation of cannabis.

== Political support and opposition ==
As of July 2023, two parties (Labour and People Before Profit) and several independent TDs have expressed support for the legalisation of cannabis in Ireland, while other parties have called for cannabis decriminalisation. Some extra-parliamentary parties such as Renua have opposed the decriminalisation of cannabis.

=== Fine Gael ===
In 2010, then-deputy leader of Fine Gael James Reilly advocated for the legalisation of medicinal cannabis for terminally ill patients and people with multiple sclerosis. As health minister, Reilly opposed the legalisation of cannabis, suggesting it was linked to schizophrenia. Reilly said that the party would not change their policy on the legalisation of cannabis, citing "serious concerns about the health impacts" of cannabis usage.

At Fine Gael's 2014 Ard Fheis, a proposed motion to support the legalisation of cannabis was voted down by the membership. In 2020, a spokesperson for Fine Gael stated that the party had "no plans" to legalise cannabis for recreational usage.

In 2022, it was revealed that minister with responsibility for the National Drugs Strategy, Frank Feighan had met with a group of doctors opposing the legalisation of cannabis in 2021. Later in 2022, Taoiseach Leo Varadkar stated that he had not formed a view on whether or not cannabis should be legalised.

=== Fianna Fáil ===
In 2016, a party spokesperson for Fianna Fáil said the party did not support the legalisation of cannabis, stating “If the sale of cannabis was to be permitted, it would create a benign environment for illicit drug use to flourish.”

During a 2022 Dáil debate on legislation to decriminalise cannabis, Taoiseach Micheál Martin stated his concern about cannabis being "glamorised" and mentioned "real concerns within the health community" about cannabis. In 2023, as Tánaiste, Martin stated he was "concerned" about the legalisation of cannabis, but expressed his support for decriminalisation.

=== Sinn Féin ===
While Sinn Féin's prior spokesperson for drug policy Jonathan O'Brien stated he supported the legalisation of cannabis for recreational purposes, his successor as spokesperson David Cullinane stated in 2023 that he did not support the legalisation of cannabis, citing fears of it being a gateway drug, but stating that he hoped to see improvements in the Medicinal Cannabis Access Program.

During the 2020 general election, Sinn Féin's manifesto did not feature anything regarding legalising cannabis, but stated that harm reduction and prevention would be "guiding principles" in the party's future drug strategy.

=== Green Party ===
While seeking his party's nomination for the 2004 Irish presidential election, Green Party leader Eamon Ryan suggested there was a "case to be made" for semi-decriminalising cannabis, but opposed the "full and free supply" of cannabis. In 2016, a party spokesperson for the Green Party told TheJournal.ie that the party supported the Portuguese model of drug decriminalisation.

In 2020, Green Party health spokesperson Ossian Smyth said he had raised the possibility of cannabis legalisation being included in the programme for government, but that Fine Gael and Fianna Fáil had refused to include it. The party's 2020 manifesto had said that if in power, they would end criminal penalties for possession of "less than a week's supply" of a scheduled drug and allow prescription-based medicinal cannabis products to be purchased in pharmacies.

As of March 2021, the Green Party continue to support removing criminal penalties for possessing less than a week's supply of cannabis and allowing medical cannabis prescriptions from pharmacies. As of the aforementioned date it also supports:

- Pardoning and releasing non-violent minor drug offenders
- Rescheduling cannabis and its derivatives from Schedule I to Schedule IV
- Decriminalising the possession of less than five grams of cannabis products
- Decriminalising the possession of less than four cannabis plants on private property
- The toleration of cannabis coffeeshops that sell cannabis from licensed suppliers

=== Labour Party ===
In 2017, a motion endorsed by Aodhán Ó Riordáin supporting the legalisation of cannabis for recreational usage was passed at Labour conference. Ó Riordáin had previously voiced his support for the decriminalisation of all drugs, describing court cases for possessing cannabis for personal use as "a complete waste of garda time and criminal justice time", saying that someone suffering from addiction "is fundamentally a patient, who should be surrounded by compassion, not somebody who should be sitting in a court room."

The previous Labour Party leader Alan Kelly has stated that he supports the legalisation of cannabis in Ireland on both medicinal and recreational grounds. Current party leader Ivana Bacik has also spoken in support of the legalisation of cannabis, calling for cannabis to be sold at music festivals such as Electric Picnic under license.

In June 2023, the Labour Party formally declared its support for the legalisation of cannabis in Ireland for both medical and recreational purposes.

=== Social Democrats ===
In 2020, a spokesperson for the Social Democrats stated that the party wanted to "examine best practice models regarding decriminalisation of the possession of small amount of drugs."

The Social Democrats support the decriminalisation of drugs for personal use. The party also supports expanding the Medical Cannabis Access Programme (MCAP) so that more people with severe chronic illness can access medical cannabis in cases where other treatments have not provided relief.

=== People Before Profit ===
People Before Profit has stated it wants to "legislate for the use of medicinal cannabis for pain management of chronic conditions" and medical cannabis be "researched and made available as an evidence-based option for health care providers and patients". It also states that it wants the "non-commercialised legalisation of cannabis to be regulated by a new state body and dispensed via designated stores".

During his time in the Dáil, People Before Profit TD Gino Kenny put forward two bills on cannabis; his first bill in 2017 calling for cannabis to be decriminalised passed second stage without a vote but was rejected by the Oireachtas Health Committee in 2017. A second bill put forward by Kenny in 2022 aimed to legalise possession of up to 7g (¼ oz) of cannabis.

=== Other parties ===
The Socialist Party expressed support for legalising cannabis in 2013. In 2020, a spokesperson for Solidarity told The Journal that the party supported the decriminalisation and sale of cannabis.

Renua opposed the decriminalisation or legalisation of cannabis for personal use during the 2016 general election. The National Party opposes the decriminalisation or legalisation of drugs.

=== Independents ===
Independent politicians in Ireland hold varying views on the legalisation of cannabis. Some independent politicians including Luke 'Ming' Flanagan, Eileen Flynn, Finian McGrath, Kevin "Boxer" Moran, Thomas Pringle, and Lynn Ruane have expressed their support for cannabis legalisation, while others such as Michael Harty have opposed it.

== Public opinion ==
The public view of cannabis in Ireland has changed over time. In a 2014 opinion poll carried out by Red C on behalf of Paddy Power, 40% of those who answered supported the legalisation of cannabis, while 60% were opposed to it. An Amárach Research poll carried out on behalf of TheJournal.ie in November 2016 showed that 48% of people surveyed supported the legalisation of cannabis for recreational usage, while 41% said no and 11% said they did not know.

A poll carried out from 6 to 12 May 2021 by Red C on behalf of TheJournal.ie suggested that 39% of Irish people believe that cannabis should be legalised for both medicinal and recreational use. The number in favour of legalised medicinal and recreational use increased to 56% for those polled aged 18 to 34 and dropped to 21% for those aged over 55. In regards to the legalisation of medical use of cannabis, 93% of people surveyed were in favour. The polling is based on a survey of over 1,000 adults (aged 18+) taken across the Republic of Ireland and weighted to be an accurate profile of the population.

In a February 2023 poll by Red C of adults in Ireland, 54% stated "Support" for the legalisation and regulated sale of cannabis for recreational purposes, 31% stated "Oppose", and 15% stated "Don't know". Broken down by age, support for the legalisation and regulated sale of cannabis for recreational purposes was 66% by those aged 18 to 34, 54% by those aged 35 to 54, and 43% by those aged 55 and over.

== See also ==
- Illicit drug use in Ireland
- Legality of cannabis
- Republican Action Against Drugs
- Smoking in Ireland
