= MV Zelek Star =

Turkish cargo ship

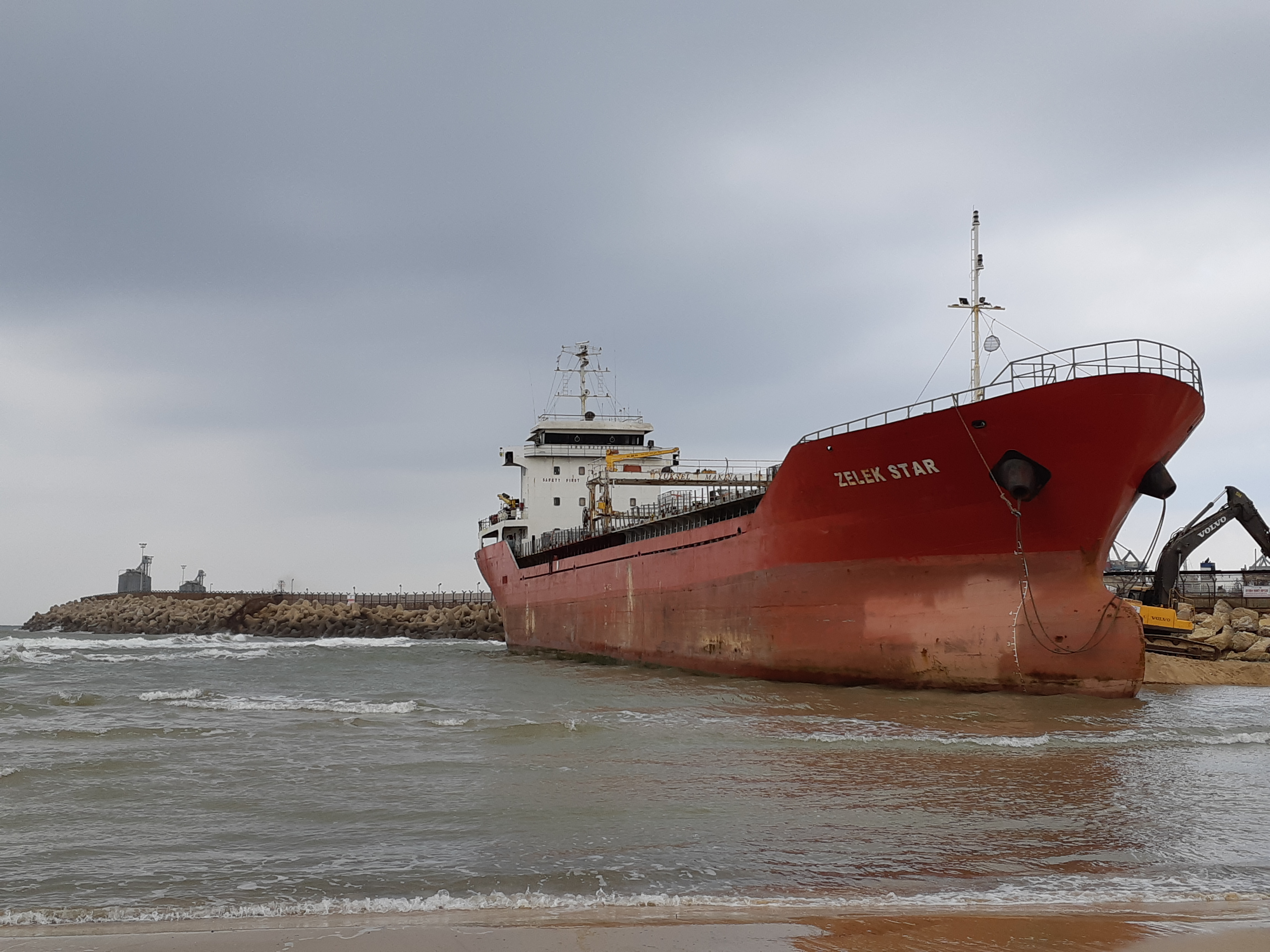
- Zelek Star beached at Ashod in 2020

History

Panama
- Name: Bao Tai (2005); Zelek Star (2005)
- Owner: (Turkey) Fuden Shipping & Trading
- Port of registry: Panama
- Builder: (China) Taizhou Yongtai Shipbuilding
- Laid down: 22 June 2004
- Launched: 14 December 2004
- Completed: 14 March 2005
- Identification: IMO number: 9379117; MMSI number: 373170000

General characteristics
- Class & type: General cargo ship
- Tonnage: 2,645 GT; 4,500 DWT
- Length: 90.7 m (297 ft 7 in)
- Beam: 14.2 m (46 ft 7 in)
- Propulsion: Single screw

MV Zelek Star is a Turkish cargo ship which ran aground in two separate occasions in 2013 and 2019.

== Description ==
Zelek Star is a general cargo ship with a gross tonnage of 2,645 GT and deadweight of 4,500 DWT. It has a length of 90.7 metres (298 ft) and a beam of 14.2 metres (47 ft). It is propelled by a single screw. The ship's port of registry is Panama, and it is owned by the Turkish company Fuden Shipping & Trading.

== History ==
The ship's keel was laid down in Taixing, China, under the name Bao Tai. It was built by Taizhou Yongtai Shipbuilding and was launched on 14 December 2005 and completed on 14 March 2005. Later that year, its name was changed to Zelek Star.

On 6 December 2013, Zelek Star was transiting through the Dnieper River to Constanta with a cargo of 4,452 tons of ammonium sulfate. The ship ran aground in the estuary off Karantinniy island, Ukraine. A tug was dispatched, which was able to assist in refloating Zelek Star without any injury to the crew or environmental contamination.

On 25 December 2019, Zelek Star was anchored off Ashdod, Israel, while transporting cement and other products from Greece. That night, a strong wind caused the ship to drag anchor and drift into the beach, grounding near the port breakwater. Zelek Star remained grounded on the beach until March 2020, when it was refloated after a channel had been dredged out to deeper waters.

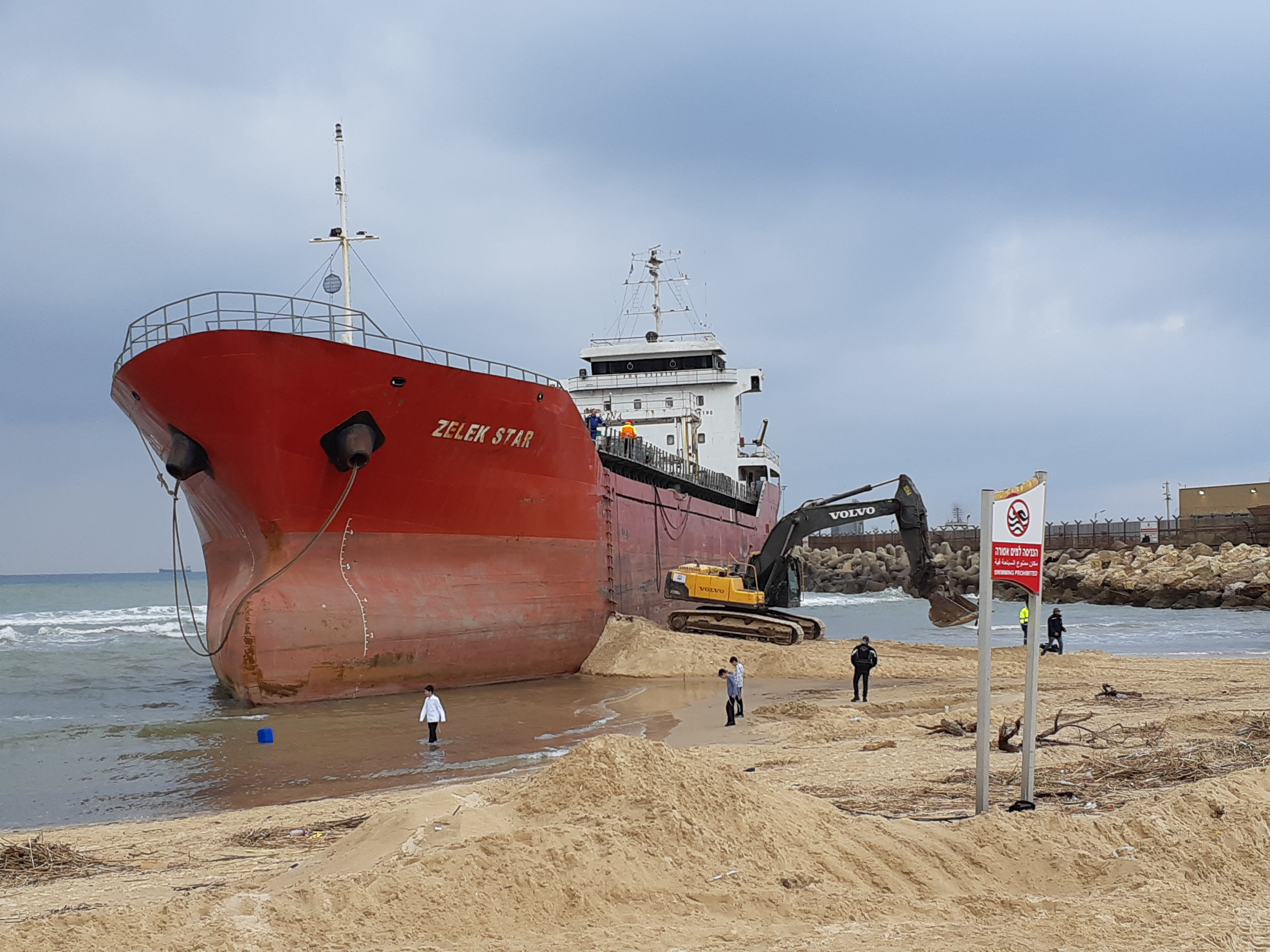
On the beach at Ashdod, January 2020

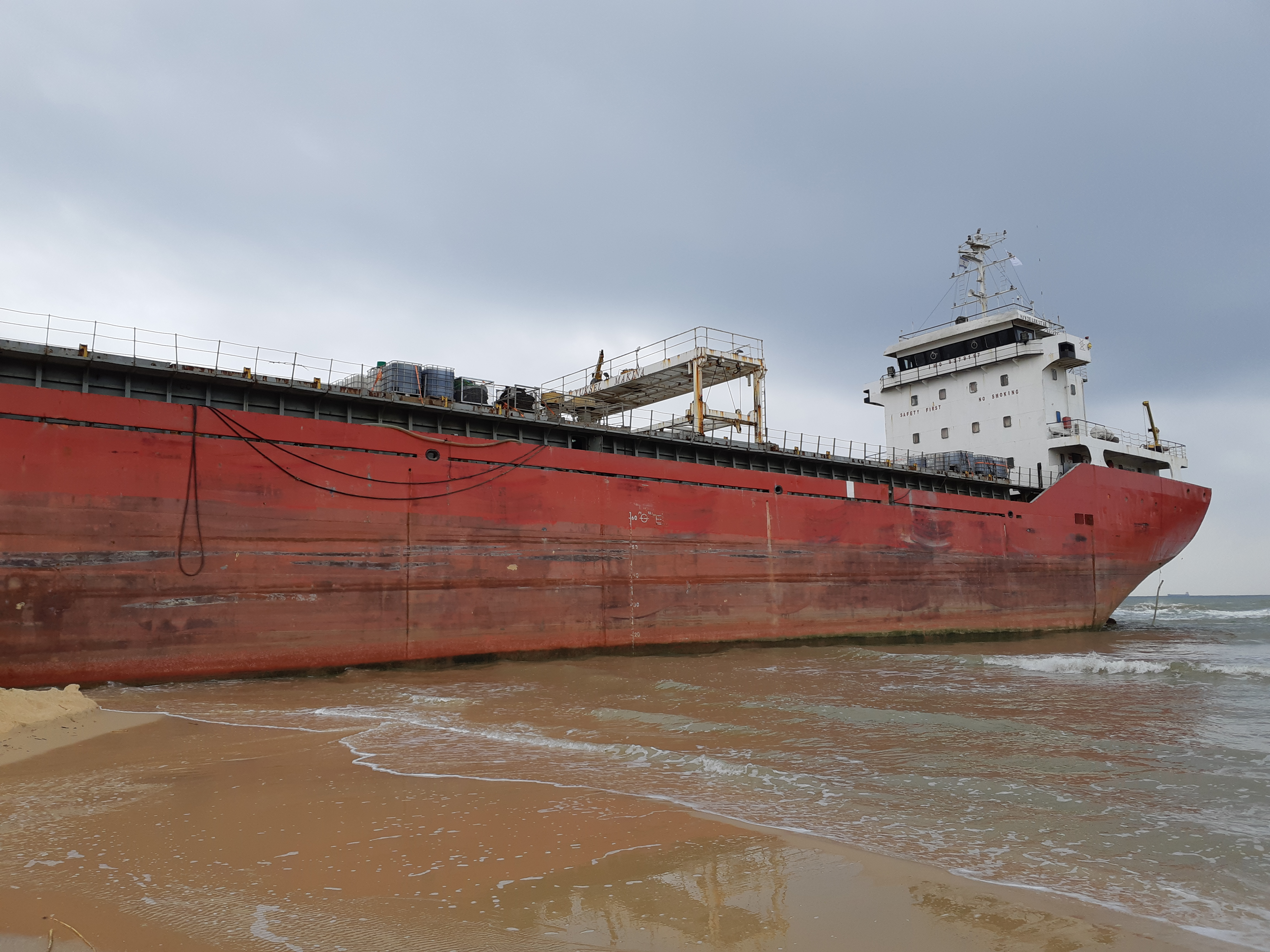
