= Centre de Coordination de la Lutte Anti-drogue en Méditerranée =

The Centre de Coordination de la Lutte Anti-drogue en Méditerranée or Mediterranean area anti-drug enforcement coordination centre (CeCLAD-M) is an international anti drug trafficking agency based in Toulon (France) set up in 2008 to coordinate anti-drug trafficking operations and intelligence in the Mediterranean. It is closely modeled on the Maritime Analysis and Operations Centre – Narcotics (MAOC-N) based in Lisbon.

== Members ==
Set up on 1 December 2008, and headquartered in the French Navy base at Toulon it hosts liaison officers from six Mediterranean countries:

- Spain
- Greece
- Italy
- Morocco
- Portugal
- France

In addition four other countries have made public their intention to participate as observers:

- UK
- Cyprus
- Malta
- Senegal

== Mission ==
The Centre aims to combat maritime and air drug trafficking activities through better intelligence coordination. The main tasks of the centre are:

- Contribute to better information exchange between the signatories
- Act as central repository and to analyse the information provided by the signatories
- Relay all useful information to the relevant forces in the signatory countries to enable effective identification, and interception of ships and planes transiting the Mediterranean
- Support the forces concerned in decision making

== Results ==
Since its inception the centre has coordinated the surveillance of 23 ships and seizures of 3 tonnes of Cannibis from ships involved in trafficking.

== See also ==
- Maritime Analysis and Operations Centre
