= Enoyl-CoA hydratase 2 =

Identifiers
- EC no.: 4.2.1.119

Databases
- IntEnz: IntEnz view
- BRENDA: BRENDA entry
- ExPASy: NiceZyme view
- KEGG: KEGG entry
- MetaCyc: metabolic pathway
- PRIAM: profile
- PDB structures: RCSB PDB PDBe PDBsum
Search
- PMC: articles
- PubMed: articles
- NCBI: proteins

Enoyl-CoA hydratase 2 (2-enoyl-CoA hydratase 2, AtECH2, ECH2, MaoC, MFE-2, PhaJAc, D-3-hydroxyacyl-CoA hydro-lyase, D-specific 2-trans-enoyl-CoA hydratase) is an enzyme (EC 4.2.1.119) with systematic name (3R)-3-hydroxyacyl-CoA hydro-lyase. This enzyme catalyses the following chemical reaction on D-3-hydroxyacyl-CoA

This enzyme catalyses a hydration step in peroxisomal beta oxidation.
