= U-Sea Colonsay =

History
- Name: Ultra Colonsay
- Owner: Seavance Shipping
- Operator: Toei Japan
- Port of registry: Panama
- Builder: Shin Kasado
- Yard number: S-K028
- Laid down: 1 December 2010
- Launched: 7 September 2011
- Completed: 24 October 2011
- Identification: IMO number: 9448217; MMSI number: 371011000; Callsign: 3EVT8
- Status: Active

General characteristics
- Class & type: Nippon Kaiji Kyokai
- Tonnage: 34,778 GT; 20,209 NT; 61,470 DWT
- Length: 199.98 m (656 ft 1 in)
- Beam: 32.24 m (105 ft 9 in)
- Draught: 13.01 m (42 ft 8 in)
- Depth: 18.6 m (61 ft 0 in)
- Propulsion: Mitsubishi 8,450 kW
- Speed: 16 knots (30 km/h; 18 mph)

Ultra Colonsay is a Panamax bulk cargo carrier owned by Toei Japan. It was built as U-Sea Colonsay for Canpotex of Canada to transport potash between Canada and destinations in Asia. The ship made its maiden voyage in October 2011 from Japan to Vancouver; it is named after the Colonsay Potash Mine in Province of Saskatchewan, where some of the potash it carried originates. This ship is one of nine vessels to be built for a joint venture operated by U-SEA and Canpotex. The vessel was built by Shin Kasado Dockyard.
