= U-Sea Saskatchewan =

History
- Name: U-Sea Saskatchewan
- Owner: Canpotex
- Operator: U-Sea Bulk
- Port of registry: Panama
- Builder: Imabari Shipbuilding
- Completed: November 4, 2010
- Identification: IMO number: 9570486; MMSI number: 355178000; Callsign: 3EWF7
- Status: Active

General characteristics
- Tonnage: 34,795 GT 61,484 DWT
- Length: 199 m (652 ft 11 in)

U-Sea Saskatchewan is a bulk cargo carrier owned by Canpotex of Canada, primarily used for the transport of potash between Canada and destinations in Asia. The ship is named after the Province of Saskatchewan, where much of the potash it carries originates. This ship is the first of nine vessels to be built for a joint venture operated by U-SEA and Canpotex.
