= MV Volgo-Balt 214 =

Ship built in 1978

History

Panama
- Name: Volgo-Balt 214
- Completed: 1978
- Homeport: Panama City
- Identification: IMO number: 8841644; MMSI number: 355333000; Callsign: 3FTV5
- Fate: Sank on 7 January 2019

General characteristics
- Type: General cargo
- Tonnage: 2,516 GT; 3,492 DWT
- Length: 113.87 m (373 ft 7 in)
- Beam: 13.23 m (43 ft 5 in)
- Draft: 3.90 m (12 ft 10 in)
- Speed: 7.7 knots (14.3 km/h; 8.9 mph)
- Crew: 13

MV Volgo-Balt 214 was a Panama-flagged Ukrainian general cargo ship, which sank in the Black Sea off the coast of Samsun, Turkey on 7 January 2019. Six of the thirteen crew members on board died while seven of them were rescued by the Turkish authorities and taken to hospital.

== Characteristics ==
Volgo-Balt 214 was built as a Soviet-era general cargo ship in 1978. The vessel was 113.87 m (373 ft 7 in) long, had a beam of 13.23 m (43 ft 5 in) and a draft of 3.90 m (12 ft 10 in). At 3,492 DWT, she had a service speed of 7.7 knots (14.3 km/h; 8.9 mph). She sailed under the flag of Panama with home port Panama City.

== History ==
The cargo vessel was carrying coal from the Russian port of Azov to the Turkish port of Samsun with eleven Ukrainian and two Azerbaijani crew members. As reported by a crew member, in the morning of 7 January 2019, a large wave of rough seas hit the vessel about 80 nmi (150 km; 92 mi) off Turkish coast, and the hull broke apart in two pieces and began to sink. After receiving a distress signal from the vessel at 08:10 local time (05:10 UTC), Turkish authorities launched a search and rescue operation with a plane, three helicopters and two boats. A helicopter of the Turkish Coast Guard arrived at the scene around 10:00 local time, and recovered two dead bodies rescuing seven survivors, who were taken to hospital. It was reported that the survivors were in good health. Four other dead bodies were later recovered from the sea. The captain was among the dead.

According to 2020 journalist investigation, the ship transported Ukrainian coal stolen in occupied Donbas and was not designed for open sea sailing at high wave, which was the primary cause for its sinking as its hull broke in half.
