= MSC Monterey =

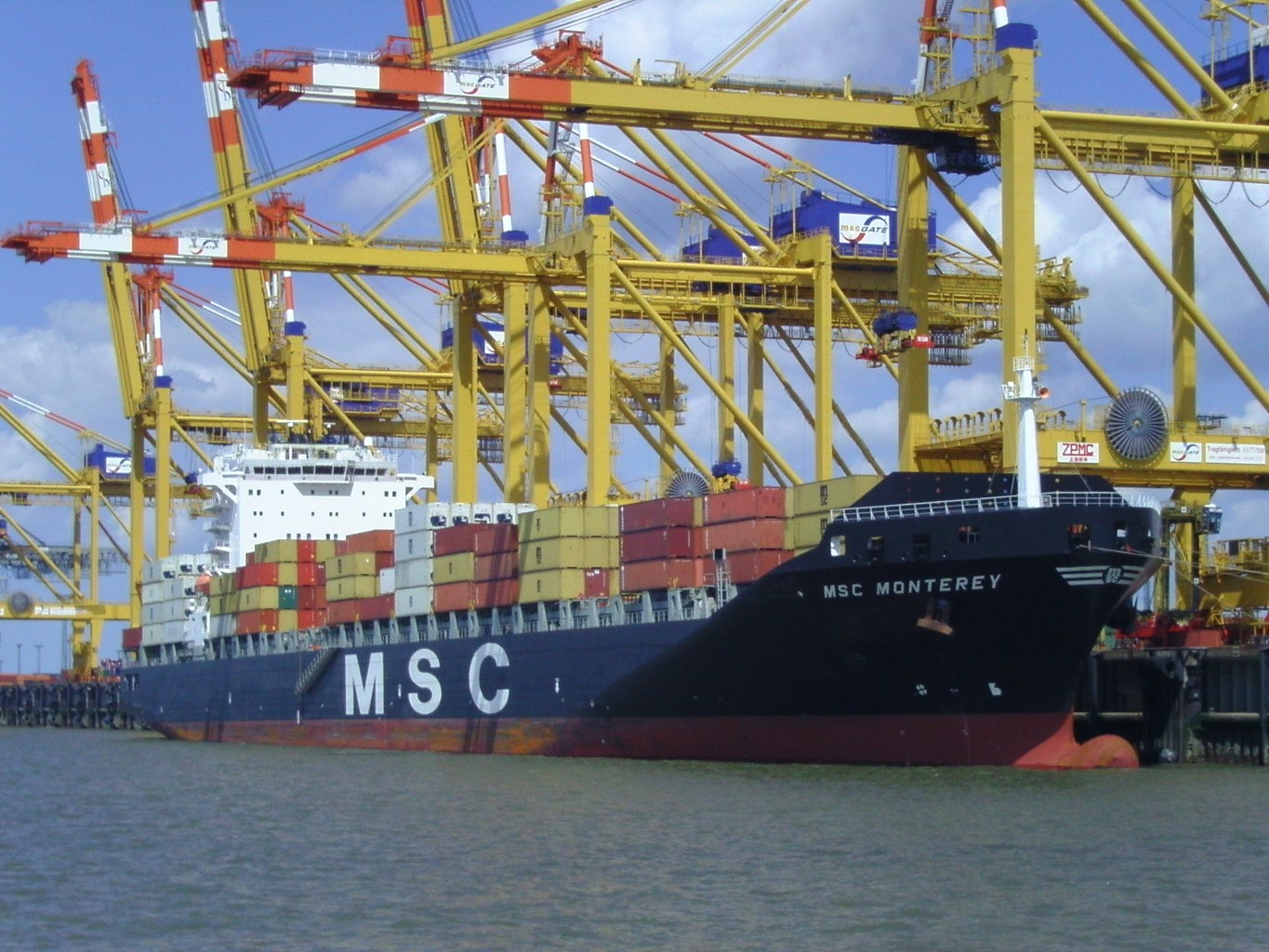
- MSC Monterey in Bremerhaven

History
- Name: MSC Monterey
- Owner: NSB Niederelbe
- Operator: Mediterranean Shipping Company S.A.
- Port of registry: Liberia
- Ordered: 2005
- Builder: Daewoo Mangalia Heavy Industries, Mangalia, Romania
- Yard number: 4,056
- Launched: 6 May 2007
- Christened: 2008
- Completed: 2008
- Identification: IMO number: 9349796; MMSI number: 636092391; Callsign: D5BL4
- Status: in service

General characteristics
- Tonnage: 54,549 DWT
- Length: 275 m (902 ft)
- Beam: 32 m (105 ft)
- Depth: 21.5 m (71 ft)
- Decks: 8
- Propulsion: 4 × B&W 7K98MCC diesels; combined 39,352 kW (52,772 hp)
- Speed: 24 knots (44 km/h)

MSC Monterey is a container ship built in 2008 by the Daewoo Mangalia Heavy Industries in Mangalia, Romania and currently operated by Mediterranean Shipping Company S.A. She is the fifth ship delivered to the Swiss company in a series of 12 ordered. The 54,549 DWT ship has a container capacity of 4,860 TEU's.

In December 2013, MSC Monterey, travelling from Antwerp, Belgium to Boston, Massachusetts, United States, was reported in danger 140 km south of St. John's, Newfoundland, Canada, a metre-long crack having been discovered in its hull, about eight metres above the waterline. Four passengers were evacuated by helicopter in Trepassey Bay, Newfoundland and temporary repairs were effected in the more sheltered waters of St. Mary's Bay.
