= MV Helt =

Estonian general cargo ship

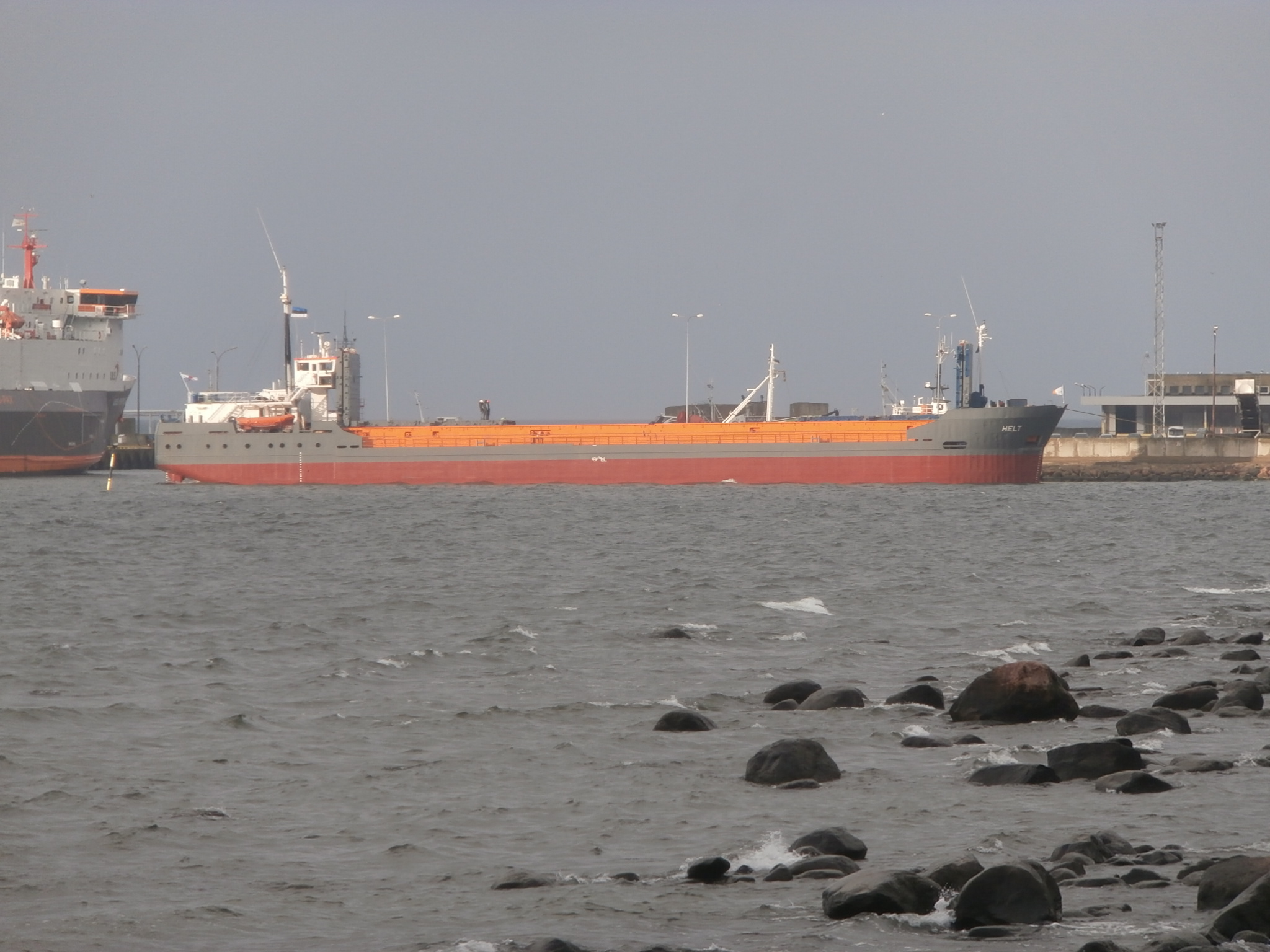
- Helt in 2014

History
- Name: Helt (2014–2022); Carisma (2007–2014); Beetpulp Trader (2003–2007); Hella (1992–2003); Hel (1985–1992)
- Owner: Prima Shipping Group (Finland)
- Operator: Vista Shipping Agency (Estonia)
- Port of registry: Panama
- Builder: Van Eijk Scheepsbouw, Sliedrecht
- Yard number: 358
- Laid down: 7 September 1984
- Launched: 20 February 1985
- Completed: 6 June 1985
- Identification: IMO number: 8402589; MMSI number: 354831000; Callsign: 3FSB
- Fate: Sunk by explosion in the Black Sea during the 2022 Russian invasion of Ukraine

General characteristics
- Tonnage: 1,473 GT
- Length: 79 m (259 ft 2 in)
- Beam: 11 m (36 ft 1 in)
- Draught: 2.2 m (7 ft 3 in)
- Installed power: 441 kW
- Propulsion: Deutz diesel engine, type SBV6M628
- Speed: 10 kn
- Capacity: 2662 cbm, 80 TEU
- Crew: 6

MV Helt was a Panamanian-flagged, Estonian-owned general cargo ship which sank in the Black Sea off the coast of Odesa during the 2022 Russian invasion of Ukraine.

== Characteristics ==
Helt was a 79 m (259 ft 2 in) long general cargo ship with a beam of 11 m (36 ft 1 in). It had a gross tonnage of 1,473 tons and a deadweight of 2,086 tons. The vessel had a Deutz engine with a power of 599 kW (803 hp).

== History ==
The ship was built in 1986 under the name Hel by Van Eijk Scheepsbouw in Sliedrecht, Netherlands, for the company U.Loding & Co. In 1992 it was renamed to Hella, and again in 2003 to Beetpulp Trader. In 2013 its home port became Porvoo, Finland, and it was renamed again to Carisma. It received its current name of Helt in 2014 when its port of registry and flag of convenience was changed to be Panamanian.

On 2 March 2022, the Helt was transiting through the Black Sea while not carrying any cargo. According to the Ukrainian military, the vessel was forced by the Russian Navy into a dangerous area of the Black Sea off the coast of Odesa, so that the ship could be used to mask Russian ship movements in preparation for an amphibious assault on Odesa. At some point on 3 March, the vessel was struck by an explosion while at anchor. The exact circumstances of the explosion are unknown, though it has been reported to have likely been caused by a naval mine. Shortly after the explosion, the vessel began to sink and its crew of six abandoned ship. Two were known to be on a life raft, with the other four unaccounted for. After several hours, all six crew were successfully rescued by the Ukrainian rescue service and were subsequently taken to a hospital in Chornomorsk. The crew consisted of four Ukrainians, a Russian, and a Belarusian.
