= MSC Sabrina =

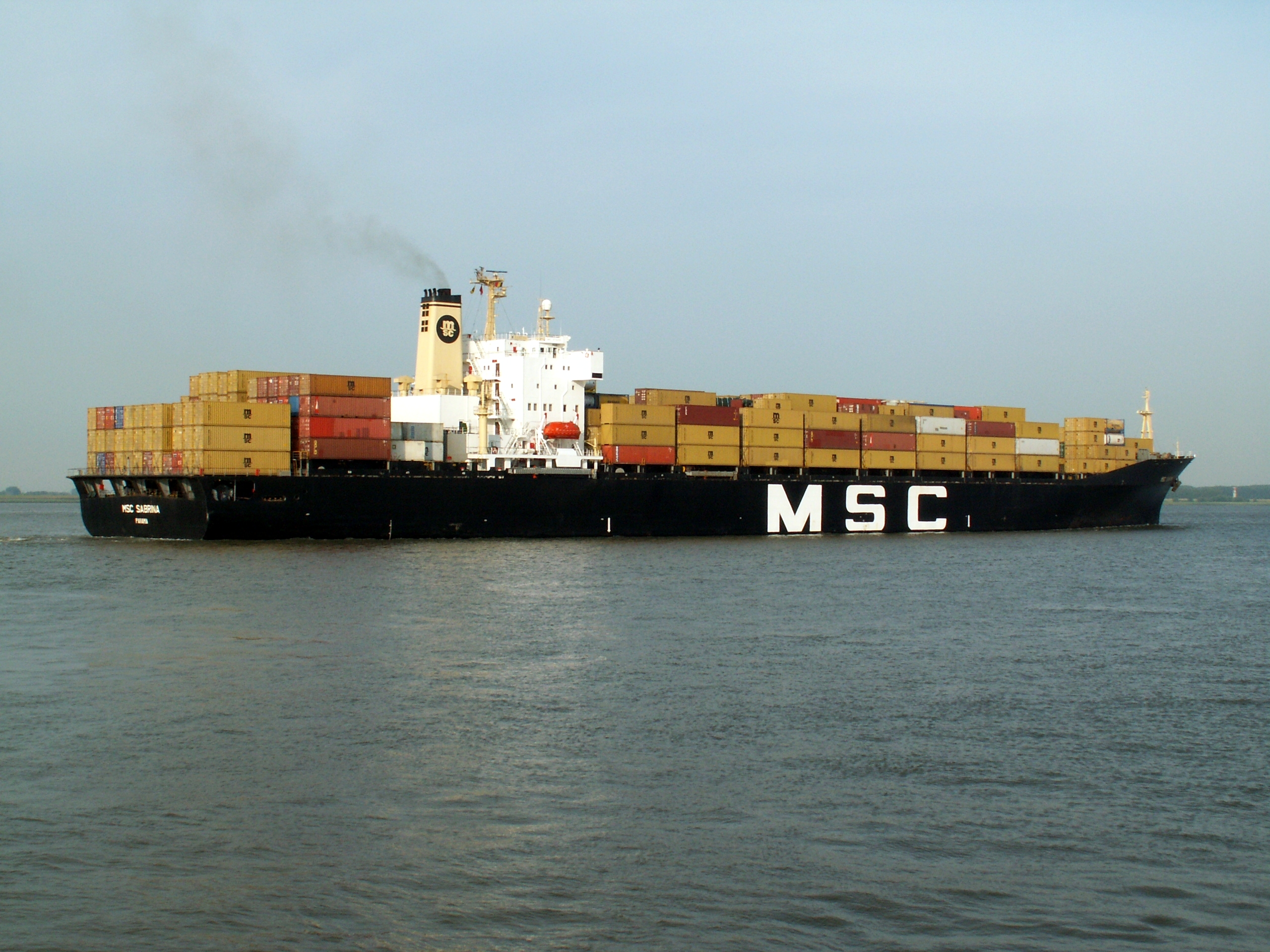
- MSC Sabrina in Antwerp, June 2005

History
- Name: MSC Sabrina
- Owner: Partrederiet MSC Sabrina (MSC)
- Operator: Mediterranean Shipping Company (MSC)
- Port of registry: Panama
- Builder: Daewoo Shipbuilding & Marine Engineering (DSME), South Korea
- Laid down: 20 September 1988
- Launched: 24 December 1988
- Completed: 27 February 1989
- Identification: IMO number: 8714205; Call sign: 3FMG8; MMSI number: 356101000
- Status: In service

General characteristics
- Type: Container ship
- Tonnage: 35,598 GT; 43,078 DWT
- Length: 243 m (797 ft)
- Beam: 32.2 m (106 ft)
- Draft: 9.3 m (31 ft)
- Installed power: Diesel engine, 22,138 kW
- Propulsion: Single shaft; fixed-pitch propeller

MSC Sabrina is a container ship built in South Korea in 1989 and registered in Panama. She is managed by Mediterranean Shipping Company S.A.

She was involved in a collision off the coast of the Netherlands on June 13, 2000, with a fishing vessel, Concordia, and 15 minutes later, with a United Kingdom-registered refrigerated ship, Wintertide.

On March 8, 2008, during a snowstorm, she ran aground near Trois-Rivières, Canada.

On February 4, 2017, she was detained during a Port State Control in Antwerp and only released after 136 days.
