= Illicit drug use in Ireland =

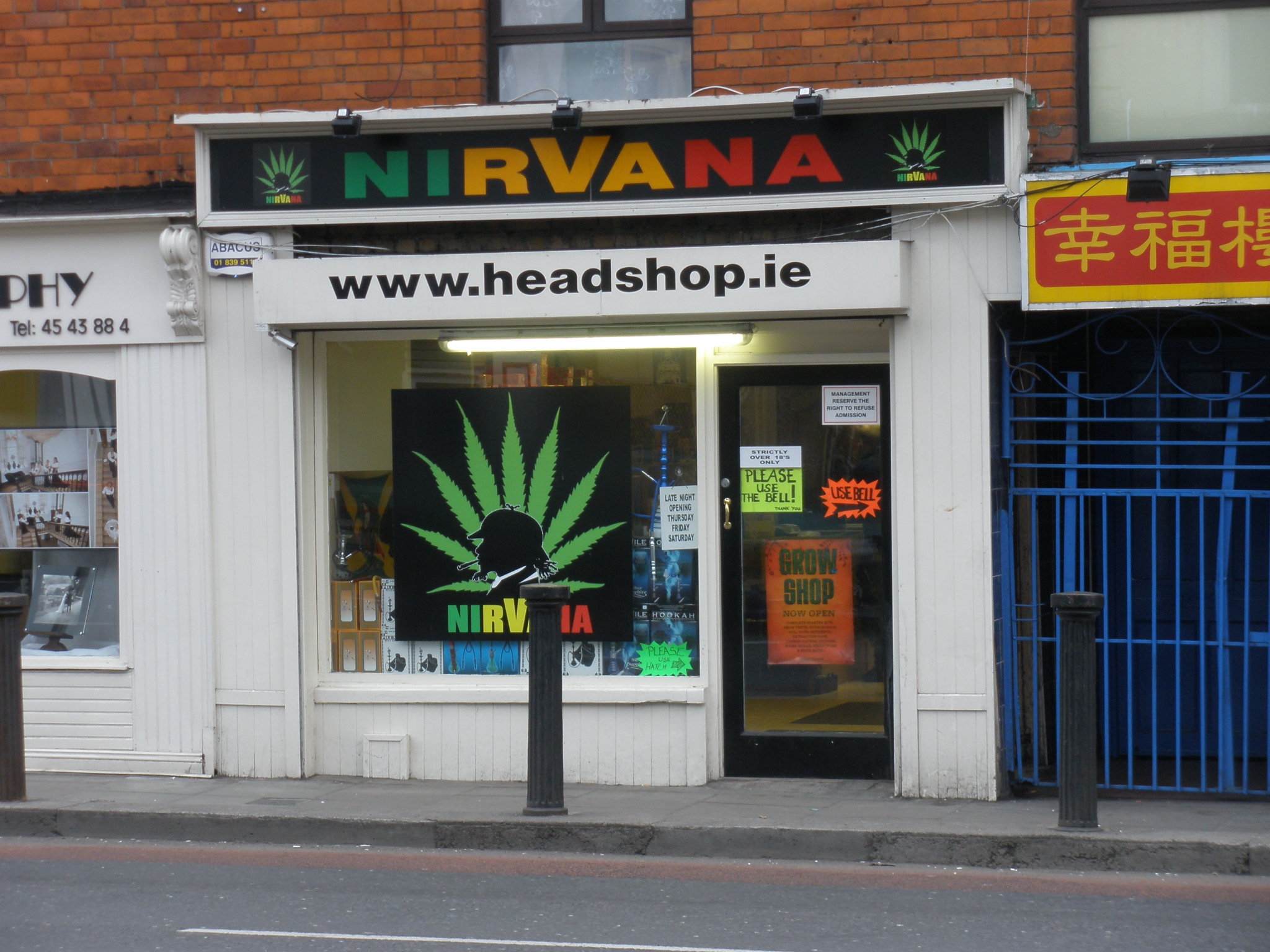
Head shop in Dublin, 2010

Illicit drug use in the Republic of Ireland and Northern Ireland has been growing since the mid-1970s. The use by young people of psychedelic drugs, including LSD and cannabis, was recognized at that time. Opiate abuse was uncommon until the 1980s, following events in the opium production centres of Afghanistan and Iran. Government task forces and private programmes were formed to tackle increased opiate abuse. Dublin and Ballymena have been centres of increased heroin use and preventative efforts. Studies confirmed significant opiate use in the 1990s, when action to reduce harm caused by drug use became favoured. Programmes focused on controlling the spread of HIV, seen as a greater social threat than drug abuse itself.

== Heroin ==
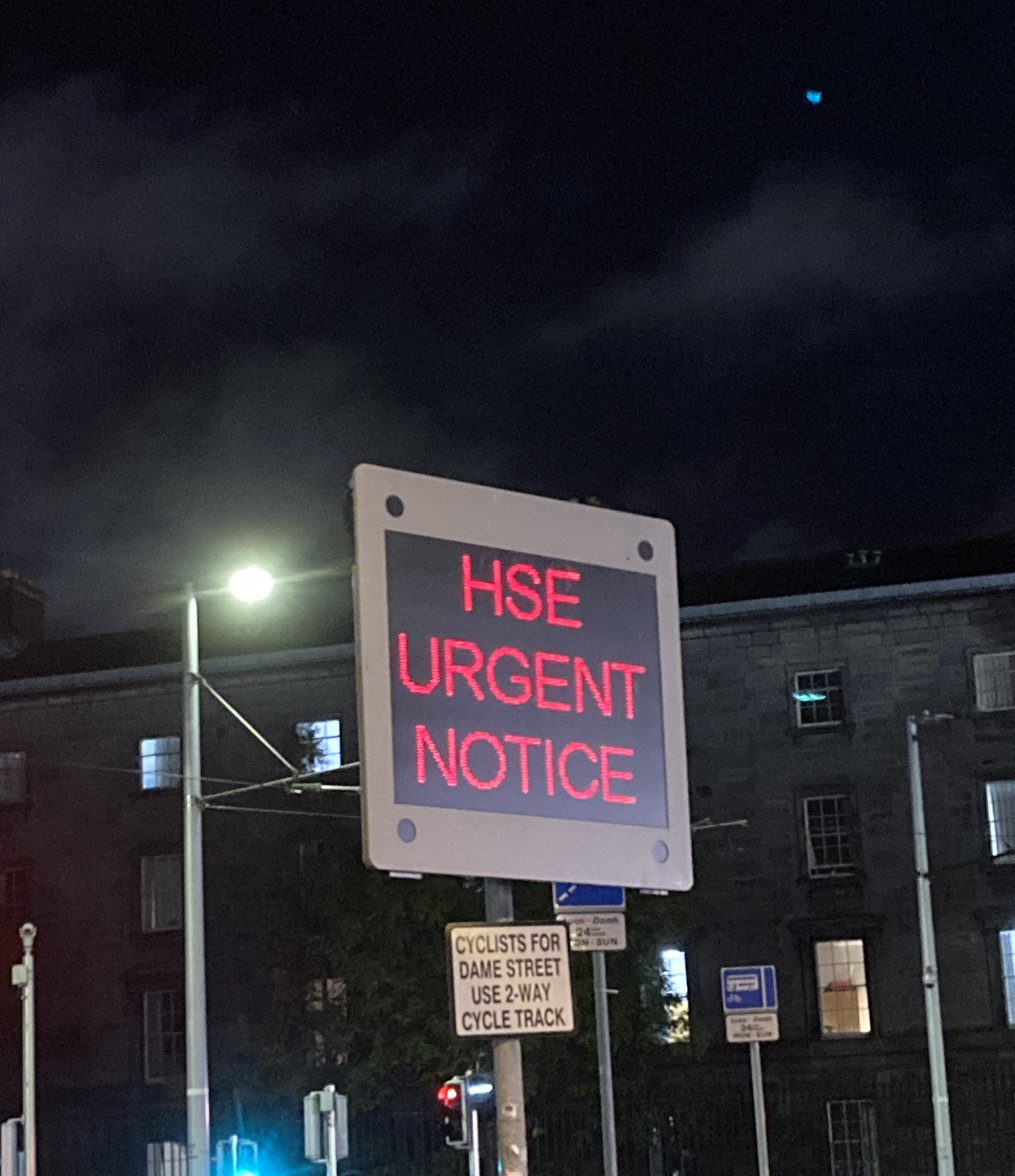
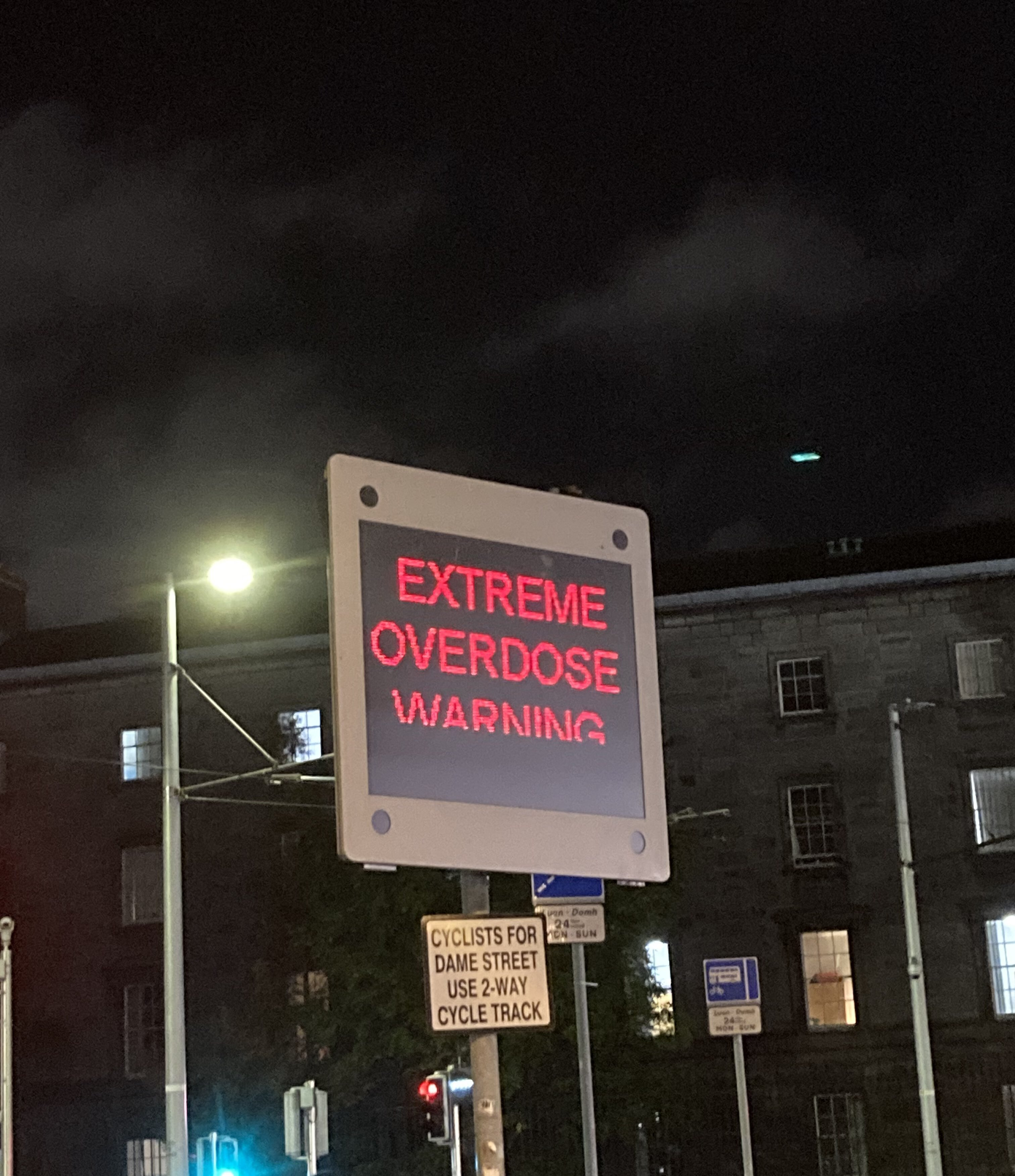
Signs in Dublin from the HSE displaying an "Extreme Overdose Warning" following a cluster of heroin overdoses, 2023

=== 1970s ===
Heroin use in Ireland has always centred on Dublin, and to a lesser extent Cork city. Heroin abuse became a major problem in inner-city Dublin in the late 1970s. Earlier, there was no evidence of anything more than isolated use of heroin. In December 1968, the Minister for Health, Seán Flanagan, established a working party to investigate the extent of drug abuse at the time and to advise the government. Their research, reported in 1971, could not find any evidence of significant use of heroin, which they attributed to the difficulty of obtaining supplies at the time. Drug use was limited mostly to cannabis and LSD. These drugs were seen as part of student sub-culture; Hugh Byrne, a TD debating what was to be the 1977 Misuse of Drugs Act, described Trinity College Dublin as "a nest and a hive for the production of LSD [...] leaflets containing the formula of LSD have been freely sold around the campus". He blamed this activity on foreign students in areas of "advanced study".

The main treatment centre for drug users was at Jervis Street Hospital. The National Drug Advisory and treatment Centre was founded there in 1969. In 1973, the Coolmine therapeutic community was founded as a voluntary body to provide a structure for people to "maintain a drug-free existence".

In 1979, there was a dramatic increase in the supply of heroin to Western Europe, usually attributed to the fall of the Shah in Iran and the Soviet invasion of Afghanistan. This marked the start of an epidemic in inner-city Dublin.

=== 1980s ===
The number of heroin users in Dublin continued to grow in the early 1980s. The 1983 Bradshaw Report found that in north central Dublin, 10% of 15- to 24-year-olds had used heroin in the previous year; the figure was 12% for 15- to 19-year-olds, and 13% for females of the same age group. The report also confirmed Dublin as a centre for heroin use, with only three or four heroin users in Cork and Galway.

Following this report, the government created a Special Governmental Task Force on Drug Abuse in April 1983. Their report recommended funding community facilities in deprived areas, but this was at odds with government policy at the time, so the report went unpublished. The government's position was that drug abusers were victims of their own choices, rather than their socio-economic circumstances. The Misuse of Drugs Act 1984 was enacted to provide for tougher punishments than the 1977 Act.

The 1980s also saw the rise of community groups which organised themselves to rid their local areas of drugs. Priests, politicians and even Provisional IRA members took part in residents' associations in areas of Dublin such as Fatima Mansions, the Hardwicke Street flats, St. Teresa's Gardens, and Dolphin House. Groups met to name and shame drug dealers, giving them the choice either to stop dealing or leave the area. Actions broadened to include patrols by residents, checkpoints to search vehicles for drugs, forced evictions, and other vigilante actions. These local groups got together and adopted a constitution in February 1984, naming themselves "Concerned Parents Against Drugs".

The Drug Treatment Centre Board moved to Trinity Court in 1988 following the closure of Jervis Street hospital.

The most significant event of the decade was the arrival of the HIV/AIDS epidemic to Ireland. The first diagnosed case of AIDS was in 1982. Early cases before 1987 were found in homosexual men, this soon spread to intravenous drug users, overtaking cases amongst homosexual men. A survey by the Department of Health in 1986 found that 30% of intravenous drug users were HIV positive.

=== 1990s ===
Ireland has a drugs problem. But beyond this simple statement we must also recognise that Ireland's drugs problem is primarily an opiates problem—mainly heroin. And beyond this, we must recognise that Ireland's heroin problem is principally a Dublin phenomenon.
—Pat Rabbitte, 1996.

There were an estimated 13,460 opiate users in Ireland in 1996. The HIV/AIDS epidemic in Ireland was most active among intravenous drug users. Treatment in centres such as Trinity Court required a commitment from the patient to achieve abstinence from drugs. In light of the HIV epidemic, this policy was revised in 1992 to one of harm reduction. This different approach recognised that the harms of drug use, such as the spread of HIV, were of a greater danger to society than drug use itself. Harm reduction was implemented in the form of methadone maintenance and needle exchange programmes.

The first needle exchange opened in 1989 and there were about eleven others by the end of the 1990s. There are now plans to offer needle exchange services at pharmacies.

In the very late 1980s & the early 1990s, the Irish Republican & Revolutionary socialist paramilitary group the Irish People's Liberation Organisation or just "IPLO" for short, brought in thousands & thousands of Ecstasy pills also known as "E" & "E pills" (chemically known as (3,4-Methylenedioxymethamphetamine (MDMA) ) into Ireland. According to authors Henry McDonald & Jack Holland, the IPLO became involved in drug dealing in early 1989 and at £25 per pill, the IPLO made massive profits from the drug trade. The pills were bought in Amsterdam & then the IPLO smuggled their pills out from Holland, then to France along old Irish National Liberation Army (INLA) (the group the IPLO split from) arm routes & to Rosslare Europort, County Wexford, Republic of Ireland, they were then hidden & stored in a safe house in Swords, County Dublin and some of the pills were sold around Dublin city, but the vast bulk of the E Pills were sold in Belfast City where the IPLO was at its strongest militarily. According to Holland & McDonald, the drugs were hidden & packed under the floorboards of camper vans and driven across Europe towards western French ports. Once in Ireland the pills were placed inside Paracetamol bottles & delivered to Belfast. In October 1992 the Provisional IRA Belfast Brigade wiped out the IPLO in Belfast.

== Head shops ==
Head shops (Irish: siopaí siabhráin, siopaí cloigne, siopaí cnáibe, "derangement/head/hemp shops") did exist legally in Ireland, and were reported by authorities to be opening at a rate of one per week in January 2010. Some of the shops were open 24 hours a day, serving through a hatch at night. The legality of the shops was discussed in Seanad Éireann that month, with an all-party motion being passed requesting the Government to introduce legislation to regulate the sale of products. One head shop in Roscommon received objections from residents two weeks after opening for business that month.

Head shops received a lot of media attention in 2010, with one doctor describing on the television programme, Prime Time, patients of his who suffered hallucinations, anxiety and psychosis after experiencing "legal highs" party powders from head shop substances. Politicians weighed in, with Chris Andrews in favour of outlawing head shops while Jim McDaid said this would be a "huge mistake" which would allow illegal street dealers to thrive. There was controversy and irony when a judge renowned for his strict anti-drug sentencing discovered that a premises he had rented to a business in Naas contained a head shop, and evicted the operator.

=== Attacks on head shops ===
A Dublin head shop exploded and caught fire on 12 February 2010, engulfing a neighbouring building in fire and the surrounding streets and quays in smoke, causing Capel Street to be closed for the day. The blaze levelled two other businesses including a sex shop, as one of Dublin's busiest streets was evacuated. A second head shop burned down on 16 February 2010 in Dublin. On 10 March 2010, two pipe bombs were found outside two separate head shops in Athlone, and Garda bomb disposal experts closed two main streets in the town. The attacks were later traced to disgruntled drug dealers.

Another burned down on 11 March 2010 in Sligo, and an adult shop also caught fire. On 16 April 2010 in Dundalk, County Louth, a head shop was set alight in a petrol bomb attack. The county is home to then Minister for Justice Dermot Ahern and hours later plans for legislation for regulation of head shops got underway.

On 28 March 2010, vigilante group Republican Action Against Drugs (RAAD) claimed responsibility for planting an explosive device outside a head shop in Letterkenny, County Donegal. It was made safe by the security forces. RAAD issued a statement that it was the "first and only warning" the shop would receive; the head shop closed shortly afterwards.

=== 2010 legislation ===
Many head shop products became illegal in Ireland on 23 August 2010 when the new Criminal Justice (Psychoactive Substances) Act 2010 became law. The Act empowered Gardaí to seek court orders to close head shops suspected of selling drug-like products, with the onus on the owners to prove they are not doing so.

Following this legislation, the number of head shops declined dramatically from 112 to just 12.

=== 2015 legislation ===
Before a Government order took effect in 2011, head shops had been legally selling methylethcathinone, a recreational drug. Earlier Government orders, also pursuant to the Misuse of Drugs Act, outlawed the possession of other head shop drugs like ecstasy and magic mushrooms. Stanislav Bederev, charged with methylethcathinone possession in 2012, challenged the constitutionality of such Government orders. On 10 March 2015, the Court of Appeal ruled in Bederev's favour, on the basis that the orders amounted to law-making, a power reserved for the Oireachtas. Emergency legislation to reinstate the ban on drugs previously banned by Government orders, which also include amphetamine, khat and ketamine, took effect on 12 March 2015. The Court of Appeal ruling implicated pending cases involving possession of those drugs, and may potentially have led to appeals from those previously convicted of possession of those drugs. However, in June 2016, the Supreme Court overturned the Court of Appeal's ruling, finding the original Government orders constitutional, on the basis that the Government was bound to outlaw only drugs of the same nature as those already listed in the Misuse of Drugs Act, and that the Oireachtas was given the right to annul the Government's orders if the Oireachtas so chose.

== Advocacy for law reform ==
The political party People Before Profit (PBP) supports Ireland moving "towards the Portuguese Model to undermine criminal gangs". It also supports the immediate decriminalisation of the possession of drugs for personal use and low-level distribution. The Social Democrats also support the decriminalisation of drugs for personal use. Since 30 June 2023, Ireland's Labour Party has called for the "decriminalisation of users" in regards to drugs and supports the legalisation of cannabis for recreational and medicinal use in Ireland.

In 2020, as part of the government formation negotiations with Fianna Fáil and Fine Gael, the Green Party have called for sweeping reforms of Ireland's drug laws. The Green Party stated that the criminalisation of drug consumption is a counter-productive policy that perpetuates business models of organised crime and fails to address the public health impact of drugs. They believe there is a more compassionate policy based on international best practice that could be introduced within existing constraints under international law. The Green Party stated that if they got into government, which they did, they would shift drugs policy from a criminal justice approach to a public health approach. In 2023, after ongoing lobbying by the Green Party and many others, the government officially announced that it would convene at Citizen's Assembly on Drug Use.

In 2021, over 100 youth workers and former youth workers in the Republic of Ireland formed the Youth Workers Against Prohibition Ireland organisation and called for the legal regulation of all drugs in Ireland. The organisation is part of those who have signed an open letter criticising drug prohibition, which has also been signed by Irish Senators Eileen Flynn and Lynn Ruane. Signatories to the letter said that if drugs were legal and regulated the criminal market would be cut out and youth services, social services and medical services could treat the matter of drug addiction as a social, medical and health issue.

== Public opinion ==
In a February 2023 poll by Red C of adults in Ireland, on the question of "Greater availability of currently illegal drugs but only for therapeutic or medicinal use", 70% responded "Support", 14% "Oppose", and 16% "Don't know". Regarding "Greater investment in services that reduce the health and social harms of problem drug use, such as supervised injection centres", 69% stated "Support", 12% "Oppose", and 19% "Don't Know". On "The decriminalisation of drugs for personal use", 50% stated "Support", 30% "Oppose", and 20% "Don't Know".

== See also ==
- Cannabis in Ireland
- Direct Action Against Drugs
- Luke 'Ming' Flanagan
- Head shops in Ireland
- Misuse of Drugs Act 1977
- Republican Action Against Drugs
