= Maritime Analysis and Operations Centre =

Maritime Analysis and Operations Centre – Narcotics
- Abbreviation: MAOC (N)
- Founded: 30 September 2007
- Headquarters: Lisbon, Portugal
- Members: 9 partner states
- Website: www.maoc.eu

The Maritime Analysis and Operations Centre - Narcotics (MAOC (N)), based in Lisbon, is a multinational law-enforcement and intelligence-sharing initiative established in 2007 to counter the maritime and aerial trafficking of cocaine and cannabis into Europe. As of 2026 it comprises nine partner states – Belgium, France, Germany, Ireland, Italy, the Netherlands, Portugal, Spain and the United Kingdom – and it is co-funded by the European Union's Internal Security Fund. Beyond its nine partner states, MAOC (N) has observer status arrangements with Cape Verde and several EU bodies such as the European Commission, Europol, UNODC, EUDA, the European External Action Service, the European Defence Agency, Eurojust and Frontex, including separate cooperation agreements with Interpol and the European Maritime Safety Agency, and memoranda of understanding with authorities in Brazil, Colombia and Senegal.

The Centre coordinates naval, air and law-enforcement assets among its partners and maintains liaison arrangements with the United States Drug Enforcement Administration and Joint Interagency Task Force South, as well as working relationships with Europol, the European Union Drugs Agency (EUDA), Frontex, Eurojust, the European Maritime Safety Agency and the European External Action Service. MAOC (N) is formally listed within the European Cooperation on Coast Guard Functions network and catalogued as an intergovernmental counter-narcotics body in the Yearbook of International Organizations. Academic literature on naval strategy has characterised it as a distinctive "fusion platform" combining civilian law-enforcement and military assets within a single operational structure.

== History ==
MAOC (N) was not established by a formal treaty, but instead by an International Agreement signed in Lisbon on 30 September 2007 by ministers from France, Ireland, Italy, the Netherlands, Portugal, Spain and the United Kingdom, following growing concern over bulk cocaine shipments crossing the Atlantic to Europe. This was a lighter instrument than a treaty, avoiding formal ratification requirements while still creating a binding basis for cooperation. This places MAOC (N) outside the European Union's own institutional architecture because unlike Europol or Frontex, it is not an EU agency but an intergovernmental body among a subset of member states, co-funded by the EU's Internal Security Fund rather than established under EU law. This distinction explains why EU bodies such as Europol, Eurojust and the European Commission relate to MAOC (N) as external partners or observers rather than as a parent institution.

In its early years the Centre supported multinational operations against Atlantic drug trafficking, including an 840-kilogram cocaine seizure from a Brazilian-flagged vessel intercepted by the French Navy on the basis of UK intelligence. By 2011, MAOC (N) reported having supported the seizure of more than fifty tonnes of cocaine and forty tonnes of cannabis since its founding.

A 2022 academic assessment attributed MAOC (N)'s effectiveness partly to its working model of civil-military liaison and low bureaucratic overhead, but argued this effectiveness was nonetheless constrained by limited membership, noting that only six of the EU's 27 member states then participated directly, while major seafaring nations including Belgium, Denmark, Germany, Finland and Sweden held only observer status despite regularly receiving MAOC (N) intelligence. It specifically called for Germany, one of the world's five largest economies without full participation, to move beyond observer status, and separately recommended that Malta join given its position between Africa and Europe, alongside deeper cooperation with Croatia, Greece and Cyprus. The same assessment noted that the UK continued to work successfully alongside its partner states despite the complications introduced by Brexit for European security cooperation more broadly. Germany acceded to the Centre on 31 March 2024, and Belgium and Germany's accession was formally marked at a ceremony at the Portuguese Judicial Police headquarters in Lisbon on 2 July 2024, attended by the European Commissioner for Home Affairs.

== Structure and governance ==
MAOC (N) is headed by an executive director and overseen by an executive board drawn from partner countries. The Centre is staffed by Country Liaison Officers representing the police, customs, military and maritime authorities of its partner states, working alongside liaison officers from the United States and Canada. Ireland participates through its national law-enforcement, customs and maritime authorities.

Decisions on operational responses are not taken centrally by MAOC (N) itself but coordinated through its Country Liaison Officers, who relay intelligence from the Centre to their own national police, customs, military or maritime authorities for action. MAOC (N) directs which partner state is best placed to respond, rather than commanding assets directly. This liaison model, described by the Centre as designed to minimise bureaucracy while maximising operational speed, means MAOC (N) functions as a coordination and intelligence-fusion hub rather than an operational command authority.

== Funding ==
MAOC (N) is co-funded by the European Union's Internal Security Fund. In its founding year, partner states shared the Centre's costs on a roughly 30/70 split with an EU grant, meaning each state contributed an initial €35,000 in 2007–08, with a further top-up the following year to cover a shortfall.

== Criticism and limitations ==
Naval-strategy and maritime-security literature has characterised MAOC (N) as an early example of a maritime "fusion centre" – an institutional model combining civilian law-enforcement and military liaison officers within a single operational structure to enable rapid intelligence-sharing across national jurisdictions. Comparative studies of fusion centres internationally, including a discussion paper prepared for the Canadian government surveying similar bodies worldwide, treat this liaison-officer model, rather than any shared technology platform, as the defining organisational feature of the category.

Funding shortfalls have been a recurring feature of the Centre's history, as partner states had to provide a supplementary contribution of approximately €5,800 each in 2008–09 to cover a budget gap beyond their initial €35,000 commitments, and the adequacy of the Centre's EU co-financing arrangement was raised as a formal question in the European Parliament in January 2009. More broadly, MAOC (N)'s own public statistics measure success chiefly in tonnage seized and assets denied, without independently verifiable figures for what share of Atlantic cocaine trafficking those interceptions represent relative to the total flow – a limitation common to interdiction-focused agencies, whose public reporting captures what was caught rather than what got through. Academic assessment has also noted that MAOC (N) forms part of a wider "patchwork" of regional maritime-security initiatives, including CeCLAD-M for the Mediterranean and MDAT-GoG for the Gulf of Guinea, whose geographic responsibilities do not always align neatly, raising questions about coordination and gaps between them. MAOC (N)'s own reporting and public statistics remain heavily weighted toward Atlantic cocaine trafficking, reflecting its founding mandate, though the Centre's remit formally extends to cannabis trafficking across the Mediterranean as well.

== Partnerships ==
The Centre works closely with Europol, including through the EU's EMPACT framework (European Multidisciplinary Platform Against Criminal Threats), a Member State-driven mechanism that runs on four-year cycles to identify and coordinate action against the EU's highest-priority organised crime threats. In mid-2026 MAOC (N) took part in the Belgian-customs-coordinated "Operation White Sea VI" under this framework, targeting maritime drug trafficking along the Atlantic coast, the English Channel, the North Sea and major seaports, involving law enforcement from fourteen countries.

A formal working arrangement between MAOC (N) and Frontex has been under negotiation as part of the European Commission's 2026 EU Action Plan against Drug Trafficking, intended to strengthen strategic coordination and information exchange between the two bodies, alongside a parallel arrangement being negotiated with the EU Satellite Centre (SatCen) to improve the flow of surveillance-derived intelligence to national authorities for interdiction.

MAOC (N) also maintains institutional links to the EU Drugs Agency (EUDA, formerly EMCDDA), which hosted the Centre's first organisational meeting in March 2007 and continues to coordinate with it on European drug-supply indicators, alongside regular liaison with UNODC, Eurojust, the European Maritime Safety Agency and the European External Action Service.

In July 2026, MAOC (N) signed a Memorandum of Understanding with the Brazilian Navy, formalising cooperation with COMPAAZ (Commander of Maritime Operations and Blue Amazon Protection) – introducing the Centre's first bilateral partnership agreement with a South American navy, reflecting Brazil's recurring role as a departure or transit point in Atlantic cocaine trafficking cases the Centre has supported.

== Comparable centres ==
MAOC (N) is one of several regional maritime "fusion centres" that emerged from the 2000s onward to coordinate intelligence-sharing and interdiction across national lines. The Centre de Coordination de la Lutte Anti-drogue en Méditerranée (CeCLAD-M), based in Toulon and operational since December 2008, was explicitly modelled on MAOC (N) and performs an equivalent function for Mediterranean drug-trafficking routes, dividing geographic responsibility with the Lisbon centre. Comparable liaison-officer fusion models have since been established elsewhere, including the Maritime Domain Awareness for Trade – Gulf of Guinea centre (MDAT-GoG) and Singapore's Information Fusion Centre.

== Notable operations ==
- 2008 – Operation Sea Bight. The Irish Naval Service patrol vessel LÉ Niamh intercepted the yacht Dances with Waves approximately 150 nautical miles off the coast of County Cork on 6 November 2008, acting on intelligence passed through MAOC (N) that originated with the US Drug Enforcement Administration. The yacht, which had sailed from Trinidad, was escorted into Castletownbere carrying more than seventy bales of cocaine, later confirmed at roughly 1.5 tonnes and valued at up to €440 million. Three men were convicted and each sentenced to ten years' imprisonment at Cork Circuit Criminal Court in May 2009.
- 2019 – the "Che" semi-submersible (Galicia). Spanish authorities intercepted a 21.5-metre semi-submersible off Galicia carrying an estimated 3,068 kilograms of cocaine, worth an estimated €123 million and widely described as the first narco-submarine confirmed to have crossed the Atlantic to Europe. Seven people, including the vessel's pilot, were convicted in Spain in February 2022, and the UK National Crime Agency stated a large share of the cargo was likely destined for the British market. The case was followed by several further semi-submersible discoveries in Galician waters, including a vessel found under construction in Málaga in 2021, one refloated in the Ría de Arousa in 2023, and another towed into Camariñas in 2025. Commentators have framed the recurring pattern of finds as evidence of a broader diversification in Atlantic trafficking routes.
- 2021 – Portuguese Atlantic seizure. A joint Judicial Police, Navy and Air Force operation intercepted a sailing vessel carrying 5.2 tonnes of cocaine, indicated to have been destined for onward transit through the Azores.
- 2022 – Cape Verde seizure. Cape Verdean Judicial Police and Coast Guard, assisted by a US Navy asset, seized 5,668 kilograms of cocaine from a Brazilian-flagged fishing vessel in the Atlantic, corroborated by a separate US Africa Command statement.
- 2023 – Italian seizure. Italian authorities intercepted a bulk carrier flying the flag of Palau off the Italian coast, seizing 5.3 tonnes of cocaine and arresting five men of Italian, Tunisian, French and Albanian nationality.
- 2025 – Gulf of Guinea seizure. The French Navy, acting on intelligence coordinated through MAOC (N) and supported by the US Coast Guard, the Drug Enforcement Administration and the UK National Crime Agency, seized over six tonnes of cocaine from a fishing vessel in the Gulf of Guinea during Operation Corymbe.
- 2026 – Operation AZUL 2.0. A coordinated multinational operation against Atlantic cocaine trafficking resulted in the seizure of 465 kilograms of cocaine and 42 kilograms of hashish, together with two high-speed vessels and approximately 800 litres of fuel used to support the trafficking activity.

== Statistics and impact ==
As of June 2022, MAOC (N) reported having coordinated or supported almost 300 interventions since its founding, resulting in the seizure of over 259 tonnes of cocaine and 649 tonnes of cannabis, more than 1,500 primary arrests across 87 nationalities, and assets denied to organised crime valued at over €23.7 billion.

Between 2019 and 2024, more than 1,800 tonnes of illicit drugs were seized at or in transit to EU seaports, with the European Commission describing MAOC (N) as crucial to intelligence sharing and operational support against evolving trafficking methods.
