= List of fire departments =

This is a list of fire departments in the world. A fire department or fire brigade also known as a fire and rescue service or fire service is a public or private organization that provides firefighting, rescue and emergency medical services for a certain jurisdiction, which is typically a municipality, county or fire protection district.

== Fire departments ==
=== Albania ===
- Fire and Rescue Services of Albania

=== Andorra ===
- Andorran National Fire Brigade

=== Australia ===
- ACT Fire and Rescue
- Australian Capital Territory Rural Fire Service
- Fire and Rescue New South Wales
- New South Wales Rural Fire Service
- Northern Territory Fire and Rescue Service
- Queensland Fire Department
- South Australian Metropolitan Fire Service
- Bushfires NT
- Country Fire Service
- Tasmania Fire Service
- Fire Rescue Victoria
- Country Fire Authority
- Department of Fire and Emergency Services

=== Austria ===
- Austrian Fire And safety association

=== Bangladesh ===
- Bangladesh Fire Service & Civil Defence

=== Brazil ===
- Firefighters Corps of Paraná State
- Military Firefighters Corps

=== Brunei ===
- Brunei Fire & Rescue Department

=== Canada ===
- Canadian Forces Fire Fighters
- Toronto Fire Services
- Vaughan Fire and Rescue Services
- Vancouver Fire and Rescue Services
- Oro Medonte Fire Department
- Ottawa Fire Services
- Mississauga Fire and Emergency Services
- Service de sécurité incendie de l'agglomération de Longueuil
- Service de sécurité incendie de Montréal
- Service de protection contre l'incendie de la Ville de Québec
- Halifax Regional Fire and Emergency
- Winnipeg Fire Paramedic Service
- Edmonton Fire Rescue Services
- Calgary Fire Department
- Summerside Fire department
- Charlottetown Fire department

=== Chile ===
- Cuerpo de Bomberos de Santiago

=== China ===
- China Fire and Rescue (Under the national fire and rescue administration)

=== Cyprus ===
- Cyprus Fire Service

=== Denmark ===
- Greater Copenhagen Fire Department

=== Estonia ===
- Estonian Response and rescue board and committee

=== France ===
- Marseille Naval Fire Battalion
- Paris Fire Brigade

=== Germany ===
- Bundeswehr-Feuerwehr
- German fire services

=== Ghana ===
- Ghana National Fire and Rescue Service

=== Greece ===
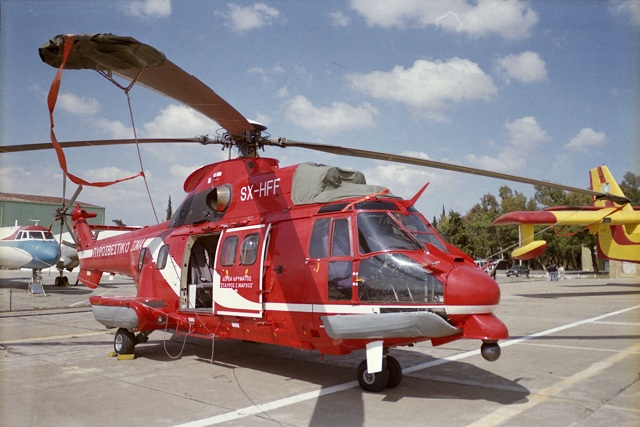
A Hellenic Fire Service HFS Super Puma helicopter SX-HFF

- Hellenic Fire Service

=== Guatemala ===
- Asociación Nacional de Bomberos Municipales Departamentales (ASONBOMD)
- Bomberos Municipales
- Bomberos Voluntarios de Guatemala

=== Hong Kong ===
- Hong Kong Fire Services Department

=== India ===
- Fire wing of Central Industrial Security Force (CISF)
- Andhra Pradesh State Disaster Response and Fire Services Department
- Chandigarh Fire and Emergency Services
- Delhi Fire Service
- Directorate of Fire and Emergency Services, Goa
- Kerala Fire And Rescue Services
- Karnataka Fire and Emergency Services
- Mumbai Fire Brigade
- Odisha Fire Service
- Tamil Nadu Fire and Rescue Services
- Uttarakhand Fire and Emergency Services
- West Bengal Fire and Emergency Services

=== Indonesia ===
- Dinas Penanggulangan Kebakaran Dan Penyelamatan Kota Tanjung Pinang

=== Iran ===
- Isfahan Fire Department

=== Ireland ===
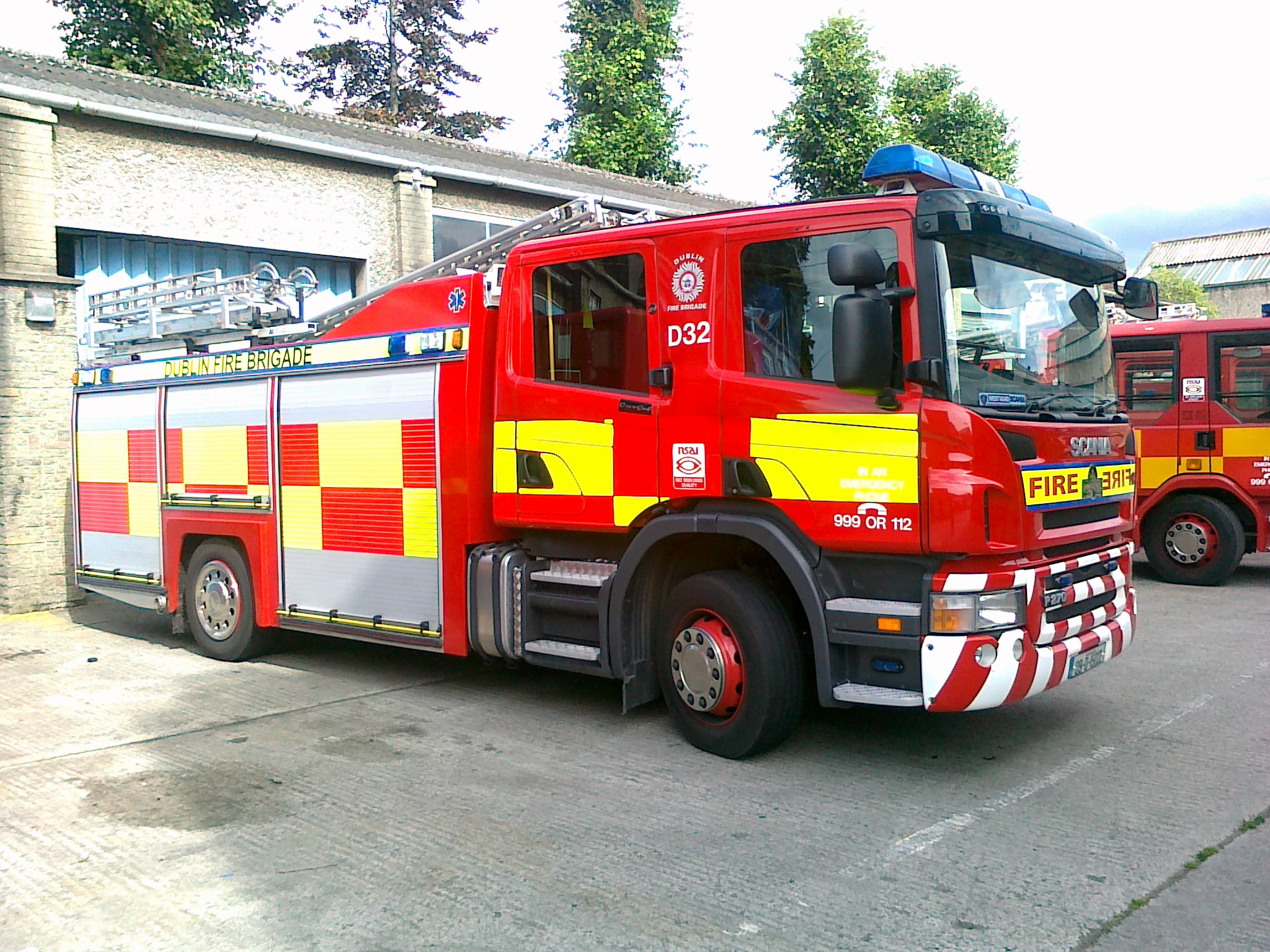
A Dublin Fire Brigade fire truck

- Dublin Fire Brigade
- Cork City Fire Brigade
- County Fire Brigades
  - Galway Fire and Rescue Service
  - Leitrim Fire Service
- Civil Defense Ireland Auxiliary Fire Service

=== Israel ===
- Israel Fire and Rescue Services

=== Italy ===
- Vigiles – the firefighters and police of Ancient Rome
- Vigili del Fuoco

=== Jamaica ===
- Jamaica Fire Brigade

=== Japan ===
- Kyoto City Fire Department
- Osaka Municipal Fire Department
- Tokyo Fire Department

=== Lagos ===
- Lagos State Fire Service

=== Luxembourg ===
- Grand-Ducal Fire and Rescue Corps of Luxembourg (CGDIS)

=== Macau ===
- Fire Services Bureau

=== Malaysia ===
- Malaysian Fire and Rescue Department

=== Malta ===
- Civil Protection Department (CPD)

=== Monaco ===
- Corps des Sapeurs-Pompiers de Monaco

=== Morocco ===
- Directorate General of Civil protection (DGPC)

=== New Zealand ===
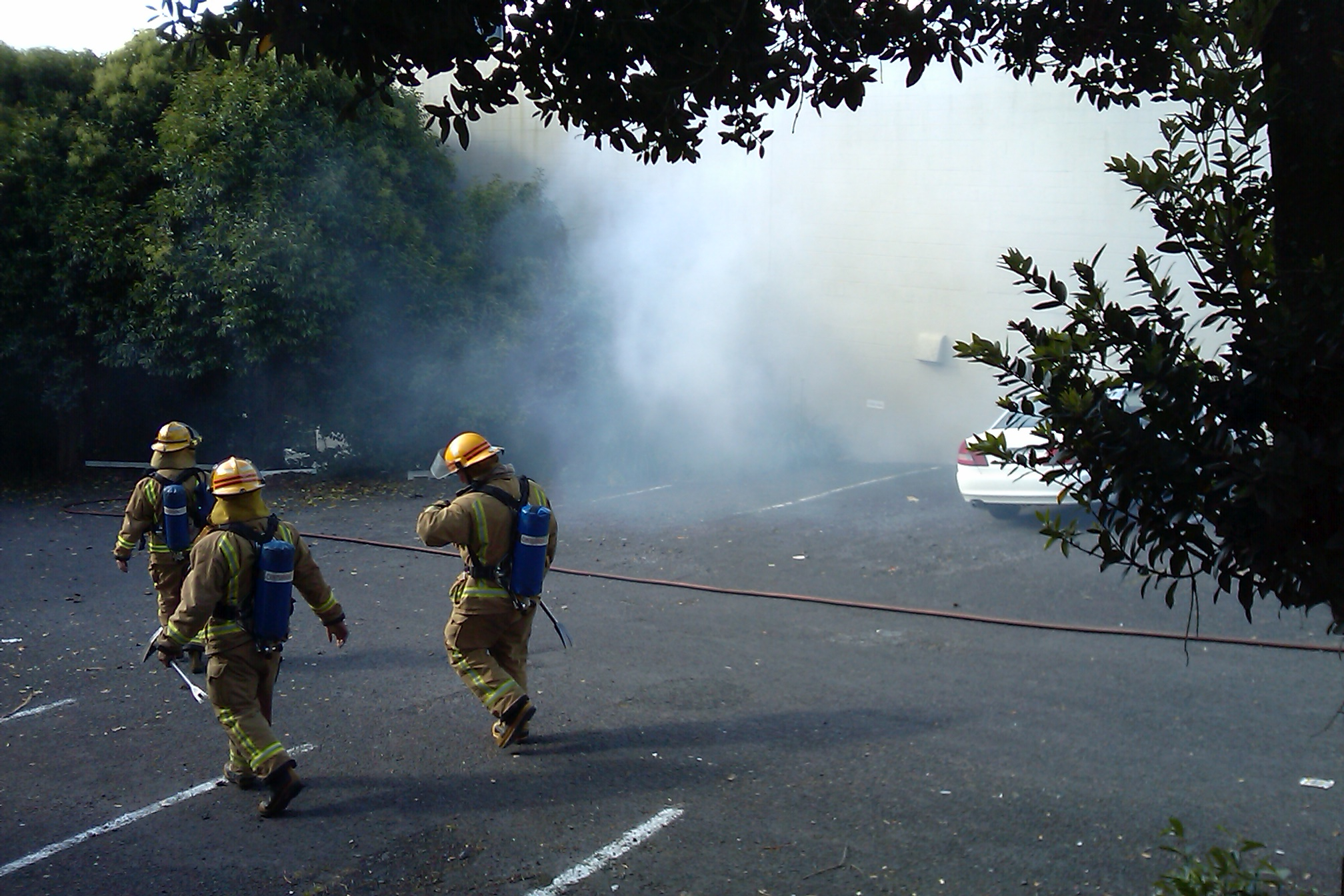
Members of the New Zealand Fire Service responding to a fire under an office building in Auckland in 2009

- Fire and Emergency New Zealand

=== Nicaragua ===
- Benemerito Cuerpo de Bomberos de Masaya (Masaya, Nicaragua)

=== Nigeria ===
- Rivers State Fire Service

=== Pakistan ===
- Rescue 1122 (National Service)
- Karachi Fire Department

=== Peru ===
- General Corps of Volunteer Firefighters of Peru

=== Philippines ===
- Bureau of Fire Protection

=== Poland ===
- Państwowa Straż Pożarna (PSP) - State Fire Brigade (mostly present in cities)
- Ochotnicza Straż Pożarna (OSP) - Volunteer Fire Brigade (mostly present in the countryside and in rural areas)

=== Romania ===
- Romanian General Inspectorate for Emergency Situations

=== Russia ===
- Russian State Fire Service

=== Singapore ===
- Singapore Civil Defence Force

=== South Korea ===
- Korea Fire Service
- Seoul Metropolitan Fire and Disaster Management Department

=== Spain ===
==== Autonomous Communities Fire Services ====
- Castilla y León - Grupo de Especialistas Bomberos de Castilla y Leon
- Catalonia - Corps of Firefighters of Catalonia

==== City Fire Services ====
- Barcelona - Bombers de Barcelona

=== Sri Lanka ===
- Fire services in Sri Lanka

=== Syria ===
- Ministry of Emergency and Disaster Management

=== Taiwan ===
- National Fire Agency

=== Tunisia ===
- National Office for Civil Protection

=== Turkey ===
- Istanbul Fire Department

=== United Arab Emirates ===
- Dubai Civil Defense
- Abudhabi Civil Defense
- Sharjah Civil Defense
- Ajman Civil Defense
- The General Command of the Civil Defence- RAK

=== United Kingdom ===
==== Northern Ireland ====
- Northern Ireland Fire and Rescue Service

==== Scotland ====
- Scottish Fire and Rescue Service

==== Wales ====
- Mid and West Wales Fire and Rescue Service
- North Wales Fire and Rescue Service
- South Wales Fire and Rescue Service

==== Crown Dependencies ====
- Jersey Fire and Rescue Service
- Guernsey Fire and Rescue Service
- Isle of Man Fire and Rescue Service

=== United States ===
- US Forest Service fire fighting section

==== By state ====
- List of California fire departments
- List of Georgia fire departments
- List of Maryland fire departments
- List of New York fire departments
- List of Pennsylvania fire departments
- List of Tennessee fire departments
- List of Texas fire departments

=== Vatican City State ===
- Corps of Firefighters of the Vatican City State

=== Venezuela ===
- Cuerpo de Bomberos Universidad Central de Venezuela

== See also ==
- Combination fire department − a type of fire department which consists of both career and volunteer firefighters
- Firefighting
- History of firefighting
- List of fires
- Volunteer fire department
