= List of fire departments in India =

This is a list of fire departments in India.

== Fire departments in India ==
- Andhra Pradesh State Disaster Response and Fire Services Department
- Chandigarh Fire and Emergency Services
- Delhi Fire Service
- Directorate of Fire and Emergency Services, Goa
- Karnataka Fire and Emergency Services
- Jharkhand Fire Services
- Kerala Fire and Rescue Services
- Mumbai Fire Brigade
- Odisha Fire Service
- Tamil Nadu Fire and Rescue Services
- West Bengal Fire Service
