= Station 58 =

- Directed by: Azfar Rizvi
- Release date: 2009
- Running time: 39 minutes
- Country: Pakistan
- Language: English

Station 58 is a documentary made by the Pakistani documentary filmmaker Azfar Rizvi. After being broadcast on local channels, it has been accepted in international film festivals.

== Subject ==
The Karachi Fire Department lost its first fireman in 1958. Station 58 traces the lives of a few daring firemen of the Karachi Fire Department (City Fire Service – CFS) and shows how they cope with the emotional and physical stresses of keeping a city of 15 million out of an inferno.

== Background ==
The Fire Department of Pakistan inherited its first Fire Department Building in 1947 at the independence of Pakistan. The Central Fire Brigade was later called "Al-Markaz" and was located near the Civil Hospital Karachi. The building has since been renovated only in 1976.

The documentary specially focuses in January 2007 when eight firemen were buried and burned alive in a cotton factory at the Site Industrial Area of Karachi. Pakistanis mourned the loss and the viewers see first-hand the emotional turmoil which these families had to deal with and how some of the firemen barely escaped death. As the firemen talk about the uncertainty of their lives and the medical services they receive, viewers have a unique insight into the lives of these selfless individuals.

The mayor of Karachi, Syed Mustafa Kamal, admits that the CFS needs more equipment and resolves to provide it. The CFS had been battling challenges in the past few years, some of which are discussed in the documentary.

An important focus has also been on the PNSC fire. The 15-storey Pakistan National Shipping Corporation building caught fire on Sunday 18 February 2007 in Karachi, leaving at least two firefighters injured and destroying a large number of valuable documents. The PNSC building, which was built in the early 1970s, had its second outbreak of a fire in seven months. The 18 February fire, "believed to have been caused by a short circuit", destroyed official records of the National Engineering Services of Pakistan.

The second fire broke out on 19 August. This time, Vijay Kumar, manager of administration, suffered a fatal heart attack at the scene after witnessing the inferno. Two navy helicopters were used in rescue operations and one man who was working on a mobile phone tower on the roof was rescued.
