= Galway Fire and Rescue Service =

Fire and rescue service of Galway, Ireland

- Seirbhís Dóiteáin agus Tarrthála na Gaillimhe

Operational area
- Country: Ireland
- County: Galway

Agency overview
- Employees: 148 (2015)

Facilities and equipment
- Stations: 11
- Engines: 30
- Platforms: 1

The Galway Fire and Rescue Service Irish: Seirbhís Dóiteáin agus Tarrthála na Gaillimhe is the local authority fire and rescue service for County Galway, in Ireland. It is a branch of the Galway County Council. The service's headquarters is in Galway City Fire Station, with all Senior Fire Officers based there.

== Fire stations ==
County Galway

There are currently 11 fire stations in Galway, there are ten retained stations, while the Galway City Station is a Wholetime station. There are stations in Galway City and the towns of Athenry, Ballinasloe, Clifden, Gort, Kilronan, Loughrea, Mountbellew, Portumna, and Tuam.

== Appliances and equipment by station ==
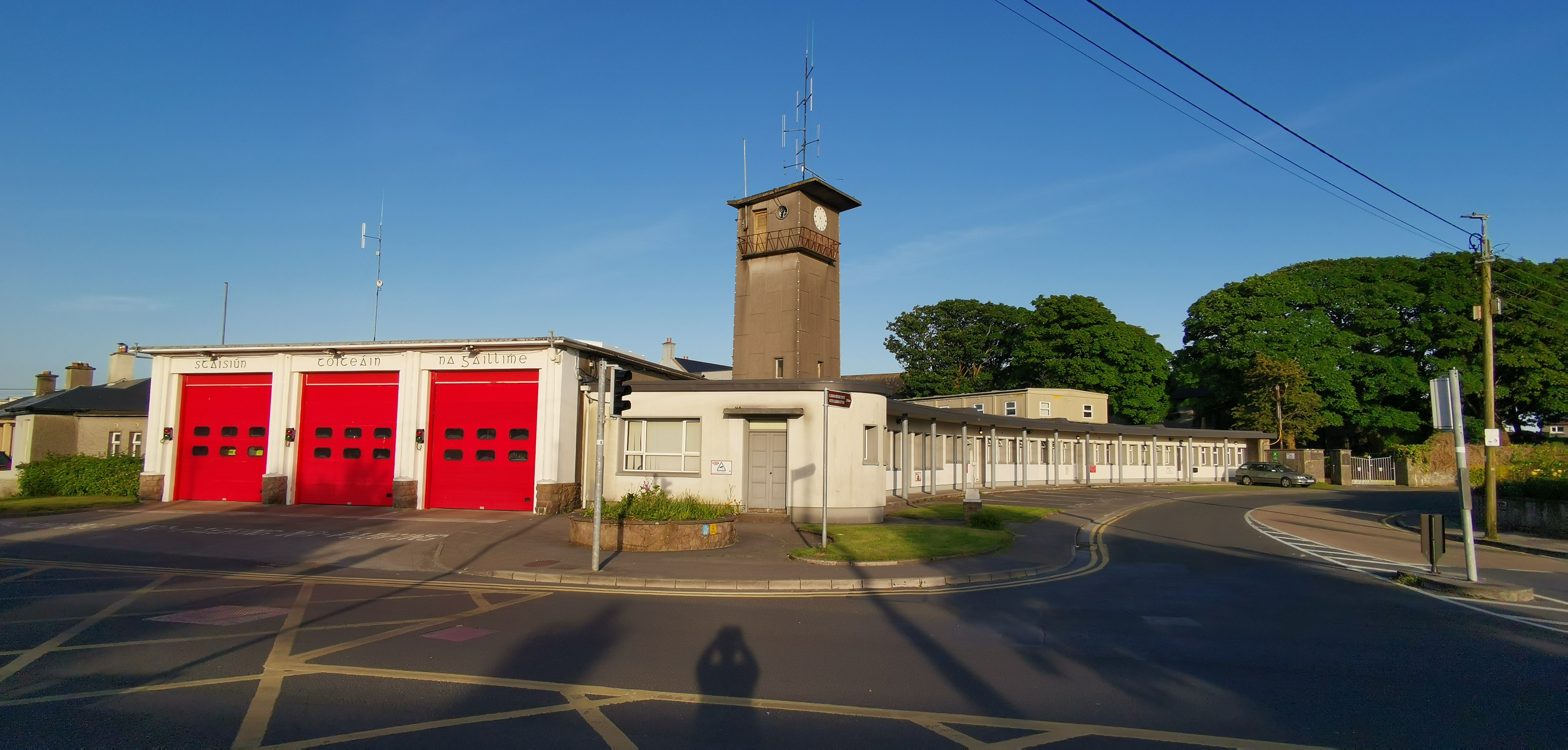
Galway City Fire Station

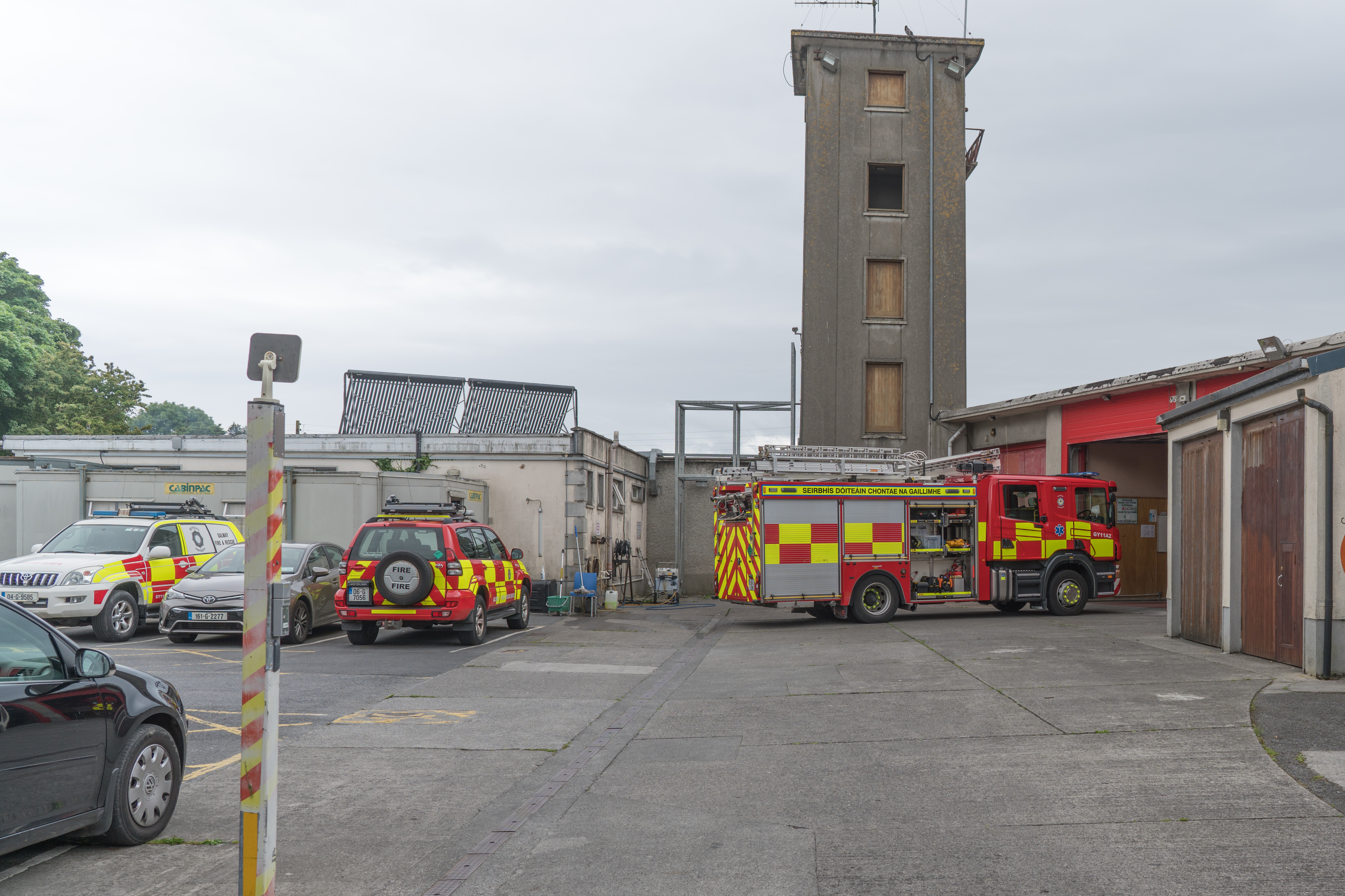
Fire appliances in Galway City Fire Station

=== Galway City ===
- 2 x Water Tender Ladder
- 1 x Water Tender
- 1 x Emergency Tender
- 1 x Aerial Ladder Platform
- 1 x Technical/Water Rescue Unit
- 1 x Incident Command Unit
- 1 x Haz-Mat Unit
- 1 x Foam Tender
- 2 x Incident Support Unit
- 1 x Water Carrier
- 3 x Utility Vehicle

=== Athenry ===
- 2 x Water Tender Ladder
- 1 x Utility Vehicle

=== Ballinasloe ===
- 1 x Water Tender Ladder
- 1 x Water Tender
- 1 x Water Carrier
- 1 x Utility Vehicle

=== Clifden ===
- 1 x Water Tender Ladder
- 1 x Water Tender
- 1 x Water Carrier
- 1 x Utility Vehicle

=== Gort ===
- 1 x Water Tender Ladder
- 1 x Water Tender
- 1 x On Site Coordination Unit
- 1 x Utility Vehicle

=== Loughrea ===
- 1 x Water Tender Ladder
- 1 x Water Tender
- 1 x Emergency Tender
- 1 x Utility Vehicle

=== Mountbellew ===
- 1 x Water Tender Ladder
- 1 x Water Tender
- 1 x Utility Vehicle

=== Portumna ===
- 1 x Water Tender Ladder
- 1 x Water Tender
- 1 x Utility Vehicle
- 2 x Rescue Boats

=== Tuam ===
- 1 x Water Tender Ladder
- 1 x Water Tender
- 1 x Water Carrier
- 1 x Utility Vehicle

=== Inishmore ===
- 1 x Water Tender Ladder
- 1 x Utility Vehicle

== See also ==
- Cork City Fire Brigade
- Garda Síochána
- HSE National Ambulance Service
- List of fire departments
- Civil Defence Ireland
- Irish Coast Guard
