= Home Guard (India) =

Indian Police auxiliary volunteer force

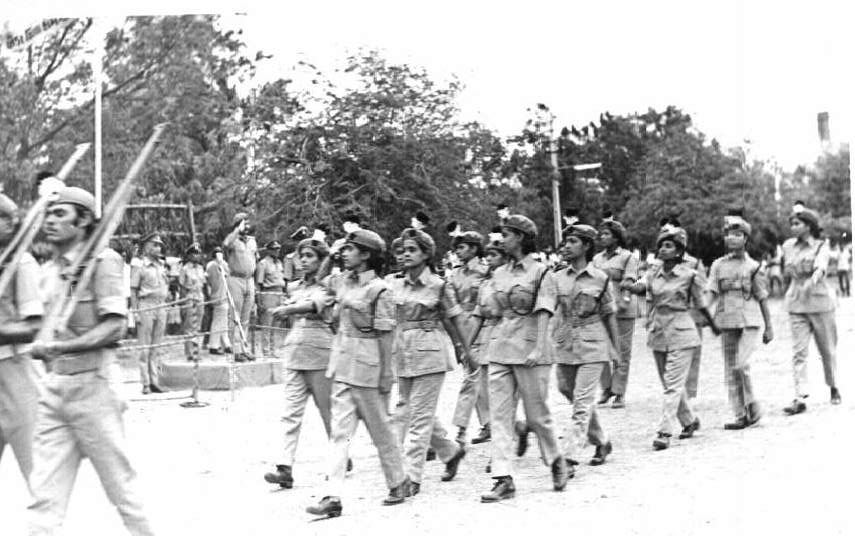
Home Guard ladies wing march-past in the 1960s

The Home Guard of India is a volunteer force tasked to be an auxiliary to the State/UT police forces. The Home Guards Organisation was reorganised in India in 1966 after the Sino-Indian War with the People's Republic of China, though it existed in smaller units individually in some places. Home Guards are recruited from various cross sections of the civil society such as professionals, college students, agricultural and industrial workers (but only to the government) etc. who give their spare time for betterment of the community. All citizens of India, in the age group of 18–50, are eligible. Normal tenure of membership in Home Guards is three to five years.

== History ==
The Home Guard was originally raised in the erstwhile Bombay Province in 1946. Apart from Army, Navy, Air Force and other security agencies, the twin voluntary organisations – Civil Defence & Home Guards were raised to provide protection to citizens in any untoward situation. Therefore, 6 December every year is celebrated throughout the nation as Raising Day of the organisation. On that day in 1946, the first Home Guards Unit was conceived and raised in erstwhile Bombay Presidency during turmoil period of civil disorders and communal riots, as a civilian voluntary force in aid of administration as an auxiliary to police, under the stewardship of former Prime Minister Morarji Desai. in accordance with the Home Guards Acts and Rules of States/Union Territories, under the Ministry of Home Affairs.

The Maharashtra Home Guards was utilised by the Civil Defence which came into existence in 1952 under the name of Home Defence (New Civil Defence Act is 27 of 1968). In view of these the Maharashtra Home Guards and the State Government could assist Central Government in organising the Home Guards and Civil Defence creditably during external aggression in 1962. On some occasions the organisation went out of its lawful jurisdiction in order to render help as during the floods in Surat in 1956; civil defence measures organised in Assam in 1962; special services rendered at the exposition of St Xavier's body in Goa in 1964, etc. They also rendered yeomen's service during several strikes of Bombay Municipal Corporation (BMC) employees, and fully manned the essential services such as fire brigade, water supply and hospital services for a number of days. At this time the Home Defence was permitted to be brought to limelight by changing the Home Defence to Civil Defence. The policies of State Civil Defence Committee were based on the directives issued by the Government of India (GOI).

This Home Guard organisation is also active in West Bengal, Rajasthan, Tamil Nadu, Kerala, Madhya Pradesh and Gujarat.

== Functions ==
The functions to be performed by Home Guards are listed below:

- To serve as auxiliary to the police and generally help in maintaining internal security.
- To help the community in any kind of emergency—such as on air-raid precautions or on any natural disaster.
- To function as an emergency force intended for special tasks directly or indirectly connected with the defence of the country.
- To maintain functional units to provide essential services such as motor transport, engineering groups, fire brigade, nursing and first aid, operation of power supply, water installations and communication systems etc.
- The Border Wing of 18 battalions assists the Border Security Force (BSF) in preventing infiltration on the international border/coastal areas, guarding of VA/VPs and lines of communication and vulnerable areas at the time of external aggression. The 18 battalions are deployed as follows: Assam (one bn), Gujarat (4 bns), Meghalaya (one bn), Punjab (6 bns), Rajasthan (4 bns), Tripura (one bn), and West Bengal (one bn).
- Marine units function as an Indian Coast Guard (ICG) auxiliary.
- The Fire Wing assists the Indian Fire Service.

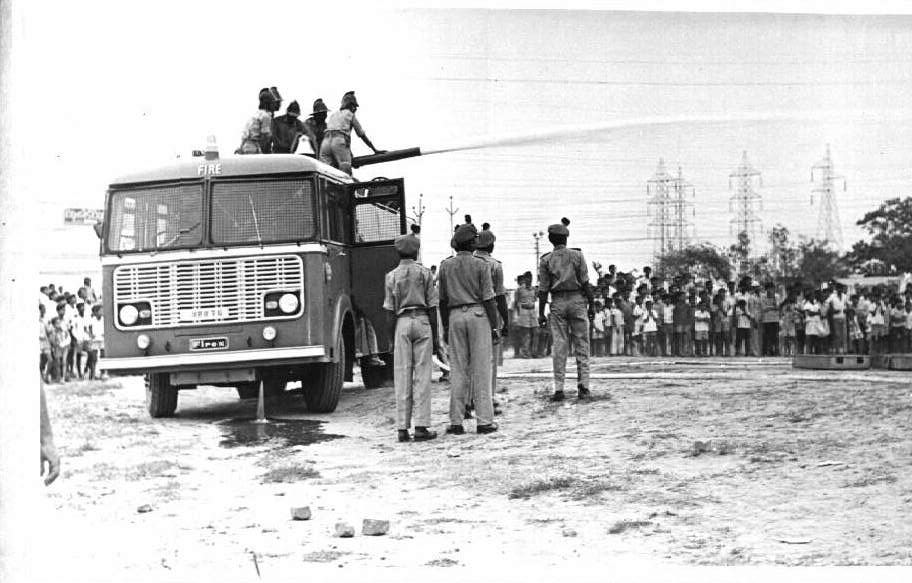
Home Guards demonstration - fire tender operation - 1970

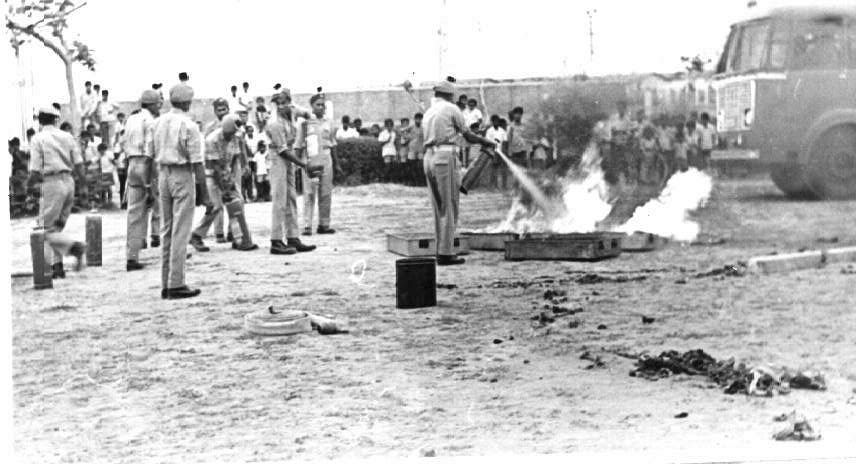
Home Guards demonstration - fire fighting - 1970

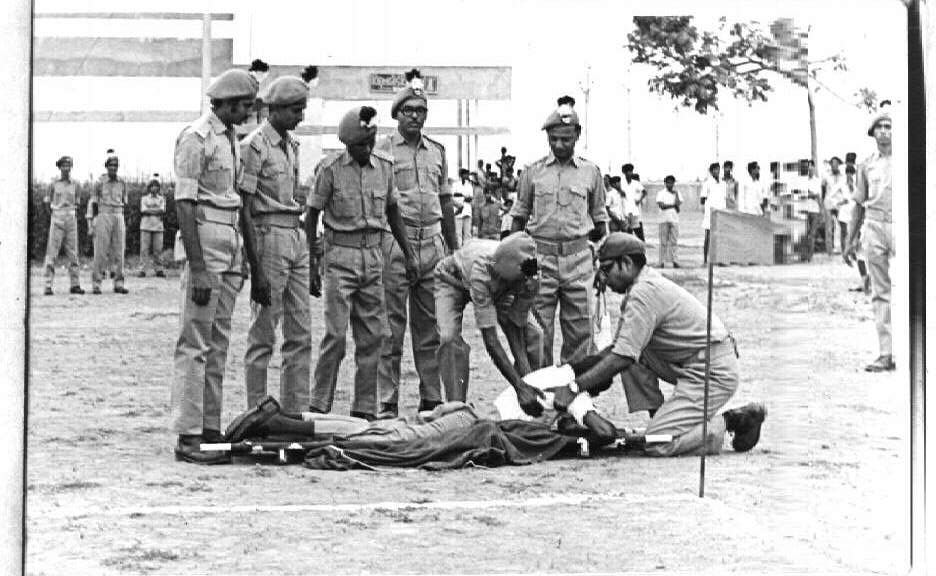
Home Guards demonstration - first aid - 1970

== Strength and organisation ==
The total strength of Home Guards in the country is 573,793 against which the present raised strength is 486,401 Home Guards in 25 states and the union territories. It doesn't exist in Kerala as its duties are performed by other organisations.

It functions under the respective State/UT Home Department.

== Training ==
Central Civil Defence training centres were established in various states to impart training to both Civil Defence and Home Guards personnel. The training consists of individual as well as team training. After Independence the task of civil defence training was revived only after 1962.

== Equipment ==
The Home Guard is equipped with and trained to use older weapons such as the 7.62mm Ishapore 2A1 rifle and Self-Loading Rifles (Indian version of the British L1A1), Sten guns and Bren guns which are manufactured indigenously by the Indian Ordnance Factories.

== Appearance ==
The main service uniform is the same khaki uniform worn by India's state police. The service uniform consists of a light khaki (tan) coloured short or long-sleeved button up shirt with matching trousers. It is accompanied by a khaki (or dark blue) beret or peaked cap (officers only). Female members may wear a bush jacket instead of the button up shirt.

Organizational headwear, sashes, belts, spats, medals, lanyards, and other achievements are added for ceremonial duties.

Specialized-services have uniforms in accordance with their function; tactical, fire fighting, maritime, etc.

== Personnel ==
Personnel are recruited from various people to include doctors, lawyers, teachers, employees of public and private sector organisations, college and university students, agricultural and industrial workers and others who give their spare time to their communities. All 18 to 50-year-old citizens of India are eligible for membership and normally serve from three to five years each. Members are paid an allowance when called up for service. All members, after their first three-year term of service, are eligible to be trained by the police in the maintenance of law and order, crime prevention, anti-bandit measures, border control, disaster relief, fire prevention and fire fighting, election and social welfare activities.

== In the news ==
The administration of Home Guards in Madhya Pradesh has been in news in mid-2016. The Home Guards volunteers were being governed from 1956 till April 2016 in Madhya Pradesh under the CP and Barar Home Guards Rules 1947. A raging controversy erupted in 2016 over the retirement age of the Home Guards volunteers in Madhya Pradesh. This even led to rumours and abrupt removal of the State DG Home Guards. This episode raises questions about the working of the administrative machinery and cadre management of an elite all India service like the Indian Police Service (IPS) in Madhya Pradesh.
