= Leitrim Fire Service =

Fire and rescue service of Leitrim, Ireland

Operational area
- Country: Ireland
- County: Leitrim

Agency overview
- Employees: 48 2019

Facilities and equipment
- Stations: 5
- Engines: 8
- Platforms: 1

The Leitrim Fire Service Irish: Seirbhís Dóiteán Contae Liatrioma is the local authority fire and rescue service for County Leitrim, in Ireland. It is a branch of Leitrim County Council.

== Fire stations ==
County Leitrim

There are currently 5 fire stations in Leitrim, all of which are retained stations. There are stations in the towns of Carrick-on-Shannon, Mohill, Drumshanbo, Ballinamore, and Manorhamilton.

== Appliances and equipment by station ==
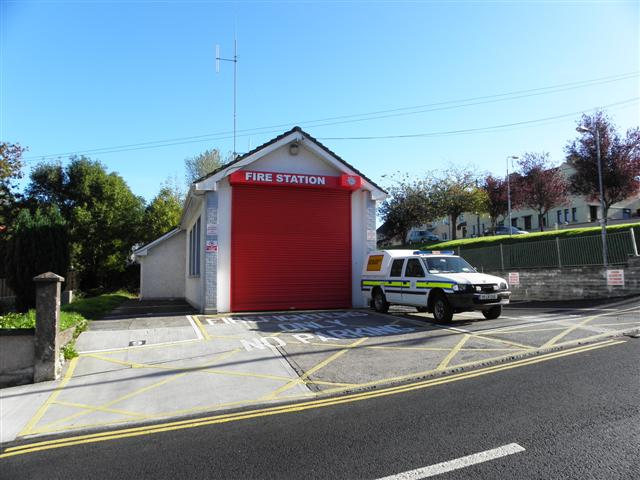
Drumshanbo Fire Station

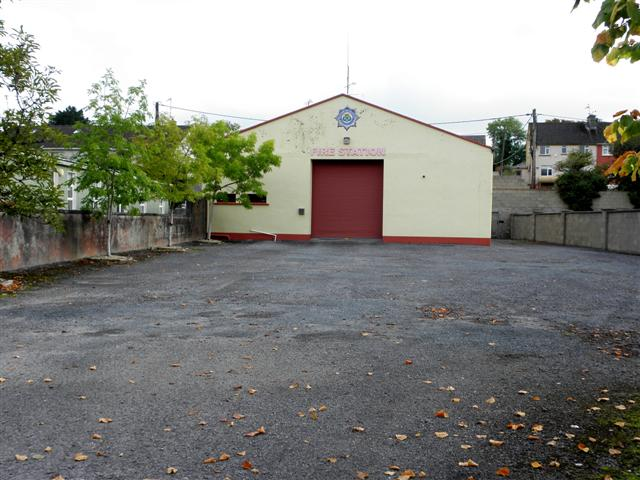
Ballinamore Fire Station

=== Carrick On-Shannon ===
Carrick On-Shannon station has 12 retailed personnel, and responds to on average 90 calls per year with 33% of those being RTC’s.

Station Equipment

- 1 x Water Tender Ladder
- 1 x Emergency Tender / Incident Control Unit
- 1 x Combined Aerial Rescue Platform
- 1 x Utility Vehicle

=== Mohill ===
Mohill station has 11 retailed personnel, and responds to on average 70 calls per year with 10% of those being RTC’s.

Station Equipment

- 2 x Water Tender Ladder
- 1 x Utility Vehicle

=== Drumshanbo ===
Drumshanbo station has 9 retailed personnel, and responds to on average 42 calls per year with 10% of those being RTC’s.

Station Equipment

- 1 x Water Tender Ladder
- 1 x Utility Vehicle

=== Ballinamore ===
Ballinamore station has 11 retained personnel, and responds to on average 40 calls per year with 7% of those being RTC’s.

Station Equipment

- 1 x Water Tender Ladder
- 1 x Utility Vehicle
- 1 x Water Tanker

=== Manorhamilton ===
Manorhamilton station has 9 retailed personnel, and responds to on average 80 calls per year with 27% of those being RTC’s.

Station Equipment

- 1 x Water Tender Ladder
- 1 x Utility Vehicle

=== Spare ===
- 1 x Water Tender Ladder

== See also ==
- Cork City Fire Brigade
- Garda Síochána
- HSE National Ambulance Service
- List of fire departments
- Civil Defence Ireland
- Irish Coast Guard
