= Service de sécurité incendie de l'agglomération de Longueuil =

Coordinates: 45°32′N 73°31′W

Service de sécurité incendie de l'agglomération de Longueuil (SSIAL) Agglomération Longueuil Fire Department (ALFD)
Agency overview
- Established: 2002
- Employees: 202 full-time, 101 part-time, 23 others (2007)
- Staffing: Career, Part Time
- Motto: Latin:Praevinire, intervenire

Facilities and equipment
- Stations: 11
- Engines: 15
- Trucks: 14 (1 Bronto/15 Quints & Ladders)
- Rescues: 3

Service de sécurité incendie de l'agglomération de Longueuil (French pronunciation: [sɛʁvis də sekyʁite ɛ̃sɑ̃di də laɡlɔmeʁasjɔ̃ də lɔ̃ɡœj], SSIAL) is responsible for fire and rescue operations in Longueuil, Brossard, Saint-Lambert, Saint-Bruno-de-Montarville and Boucherville, Quebec, Canada.

Longueuil Fire Department

== History ==
In 2002, as the result of provincially mandated municipal mergers, the 8 existing suburbans fire services were merged with that of the City of Longueuil to form the SSIAL, which now serves around 400,000 people.

=== List of predecessor departments ===
- Boucherville Fire Department
- Brossard Fire Department
- Greenfield Park Fire Department
- Lemoyne Volunteer Fire Department
- Longueuil Fire Department
- Saint-Bruno Fire Department
- Saint-Hubert Fire Department
- Saint-Lambert Fire Department

== Trucks ==
The SSIAL(ALFD) has nearly 30 aerials and pumpers.

== Operations ==
The SSIAL comprises the following operating divisions:

- Division Sud
  - Station 31 (Vieux-Longueuil borough) 2205, rue Saint-Georges, Le Moyne
  - Station 32 (Saint-Hubert borough) (closed)
  - Station 33 (Greenfield-Park borough) 1510, rue Bellevue, Greenfield-Park
  - Station 34 (Saint-Hubert) 2980, boulevard Moïse-Vincent, Saint-Hubert
  - Station 41 (City of Saint-Lambert) 55, avenue Argyle, Saint-Lambert
  - Station 43 (City of Brossard) 3300, boulevard Lapinière, Brossard
  - Station 44 (City of Brossard) 3800, boulevard Matte, Brossard
- Division Nord
  - Station 11 (City of Boucherville) 600, chemin du Lac, Boucherville
  - Station 14 (City of Saint-Bruno-de-Montarville) 1595, rue Montarville, Saint-Bruno-de-Montarville
  - Station 21 (Vieux- Longueuil borough) 111, rue Saint-Jean, Longueuil
  - Station 22 (Vieux- Longueuil borough) 1920, rue Brébeuf, Longueuil
  - Station 23 (Vieux- Longueuil borough) 1700, Boulevard Curé-Poirier Est, Longueuil

== See also ==
- List of fire departments
- Service de police de Longueuil
