= Canadian Forces fire fighters =

Canadian Forces Fire and Emergency Services provide fire and emergency services to Canadian Forces land bases in Canada where local services are not available or sufficient.

Some bases also require airport fire fighting capabilities, especially those in air bases.

== Personnel ==
Military firefighters in the Canadian Forces are non-commissioned members, and are required to undergo basic training. After basic training they go to the Canadian Forces Fire Academy at CFB Borden. From there, members are posted to a military base.

The military firefighters are supplemented by civilian Department of National Defence firefighters on many bases. As of 2011, there were approximately 570 military firefighters and 500 civilians. Military firefighters were deployed as part of Canadian military operations in Afghanistan and the response to the 2010 Haiti earthquake.

=== Ranks ===
- Fire chief - Captain/master warrant officer
- Deputy fire chief - master warrant officer
- Chief fire inspector - Sergeant
- Inspector - Master corporal or corporal
- Platoon chief - Warrant officer
- Deputy platoon chief - Sergeant
- Crew chief - Master corporal
- Firefighter - Aviator or corporal

== Operations ==
Following is a list of some of the CFBs with fire and EMS services:

- CFS Alert - Military (only on tasking)
- 3 Wing Bagotville - Military
- CFB Borden - DND civilian
- 4 Wing Cold Lake - Military
- 19 Wing Comox - Military
- CFD Dundurn - Composite
- 9 Wing Gander - Military (fire inspector position)
- 14 Wing Greenwood - Military
- Edmonton Garrison - Military/ DND civilian
- CFB Esquimalt - DND civilian
- 5th Canadian Division Support Base (5 CDSB) Gagetown - DND civilian
- 5 Wing Goosebay - Contracted to Serco Canada Inc.
- 14 Wing Greenwood - Military
- CFB Halifax - DND civilian
- 4th Canadian Division Training Centre Meaford - DND civilian
- NFTC 15 Wing Moose Jaw - Contracted to ATCO Frontec
- Garrison Petawawa - DND civilian
- 12 Wing Shearwater - Military
- CFB Suffield - DND civilian
- 8 Wing Trenton - Military
- 2nd Canadian Division Support Base (2 CDSB) Valcartier - DND civilian
- ASU Wainwright - DND civilian
- 17 Wing Winnipeg - Military

CFB Kingston and CFB North Bay once had their own fire services, but now receive fire protection from the Kingston and North Bay municipal fire departments respectively.

== Training ==
=== Canadian Forces Fire and CBRN Academy ===
Training for CF firefighters takes places at the Canadian Forces Fire and CBRN Academy (CFFCA) at CFB Borden for a period of six months. The CFFCA is mandated and internationally accredited in the delivery of the fire service curriculum in the areas of fire prevention, aircraft rescue fire fighting, structural fire fighting, fire investigation, rescue and respiratory protection administration.

== Equipment ==
The Canadian Forces use a mix of airport and structural fire apparatus. Current equipment includes aircraft rescue and firefighting apparatus built by E-One and structural fire apparatus with custom Spartan Motors chassis and bodies by Fort Garry Fire Trucks. Additional structural pumpers were purchased through a 2014 contract with E-One. Bodywork for rescue trucks and range (brush) trucks were also supplied by Fort Garry. Other apparatus providers include the American branch of Rosenbauer (aerial platforms) and KME (aircraft rescue and firefighting).

== See also ==
- List of fire departments
