= Hellenic Fire Service =

Greek national fire and rescue service

Hellenic Fire Corps
- Πυροσβεστικό Σώμα; Pyrosvestiko Soma

Fire Service overview
- Formed: 1926
- Preceding Fire Service: Police Fire Brigade
- Jurisdiction: Greece
- Headquarters: Athens, Greece
- Motto: ΘΑΡΣΕΙΝ ΣΩΖΕΙΝ (Bravery Saves [Lives])
- Employees: ~21,000 (11.470 full-time firefighters 2.410 5-year contract firefighters 2,500 seasonal firefighters 3,573 volunteer firefighters)
- Fire Service executives: Lieutenant General Theodoros Vagias, Commander in Chief; Lieutenant General Anastasios Pappas, Deputy Chief
- Website: www.fireservice.gr/el/home

The Hellenic Fire Corps (Greek: Πυροσβεστικό Σώμα, romanized: Pyrosvestiko Soma - Firefighting Uniformed Corps of Greece) is the national fire and rescue service of Greece. It is part of the Ministry for Climate Crisis and Civil Protection.

== History ==
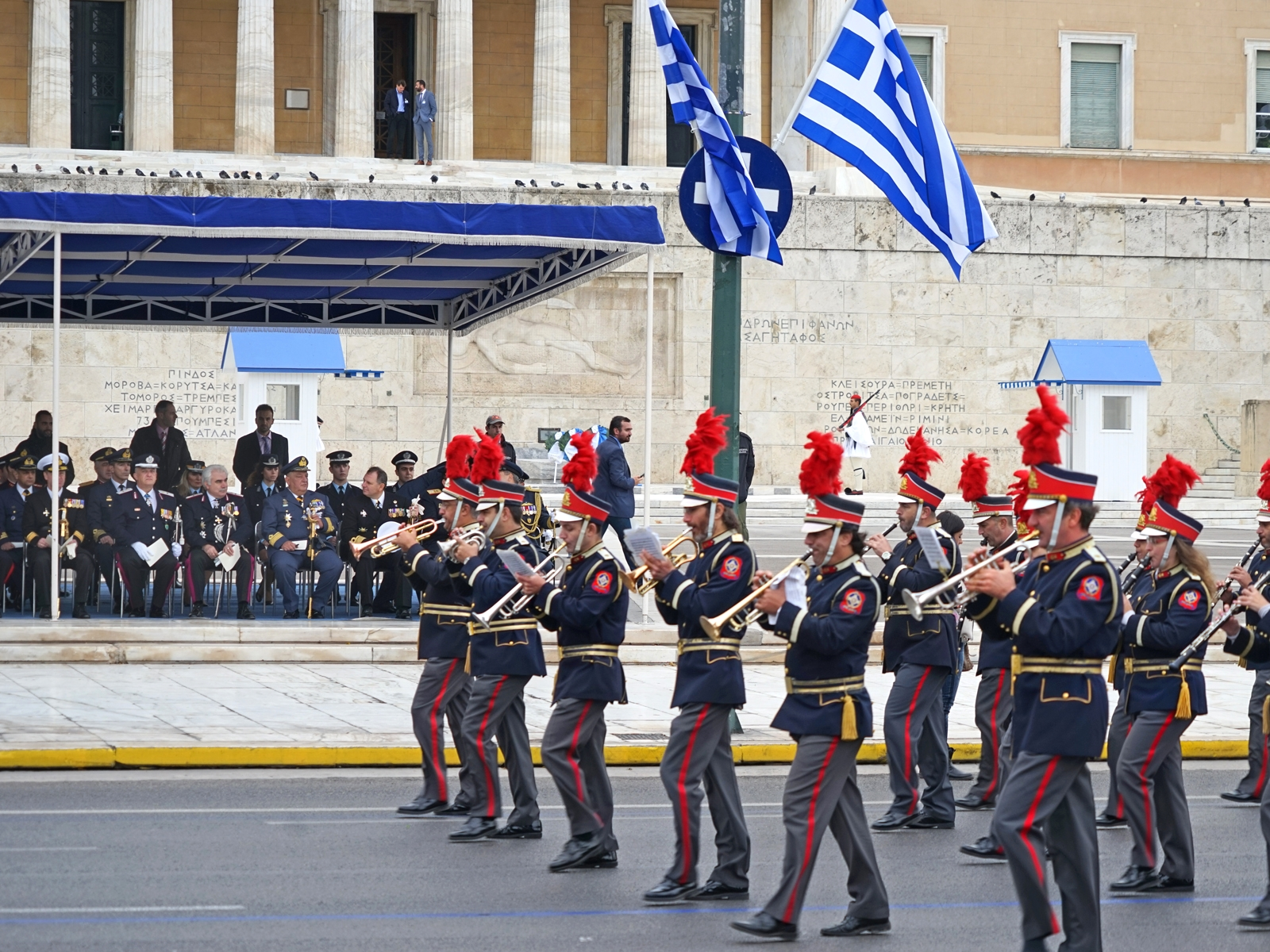
The Band of the Hellenic Fire Corps in a parade.

In 1833, with the establishment of the Greek Kingdom, the fire responsibility was given to the individual prefectures and municipalities. As soon as the Greek state was founded, the responsibility of fire safety was assigned to the prefects. The municipalities had to have personnel - the "peacekeepers" - and the means to extinguish fires. The pioneer companies of the army were responsible for public buildings.

In 1854 a Firemen Company (Λόχος Πυροσβεστών) was formed in Athens, as part of the Greek Army, expanded in 1861 into a two-company mixed sapper and firemen formation (Διλοχία Σκαπανέων και Πυροσβεστών). The company had a strength of 92 men.

Πυροσβεστών - the word for firefighter - translates to "fire extinguishers" (people, not the object).

The "Pioneer and Fire Brigade" in addition to fire fighting, carried out road construction works. The Gendarmerie and the Cities Police assisted in the firefighting work.

In 1910, the military squadron was briefly called the "Fire Squad." The Fire Squadron volunteers and draftees served for a three-year term. It was not until 1914 that the Corps, now again known as Firemen Company and still under military control, was expanded to other cities outside Athens, covering also Thessaloniki, Patras and Piraeus The municipalities were responsible for the rest of the country. In 1926, the Fire Service was formed as a separate branch within the military, but proved ineffective, so that in 1929, a Greek émigré from Russia, the former head of St Petersburg Fire Service Alkiviadis Kokkinakis, was tasked with reforming the service. In 1930, the Fire Corps were reconstituted as an independent national authority under the Ministry of the Interior. Until 1975 the chiefs of the service were transferred from the Gendarmerie or the Cities Police.

In 1984 the incumbent government sought to unify all preexisting security forces, including the Fire Service, into the Hellenic Police. Students of the Firefighting Academy protested this by squatting on the premises and the Force's incorporation was never realised.

After 1998 the Fire Corps were given the responsibility for forest fires, taking over from the Forestry Service.

== Operation ==
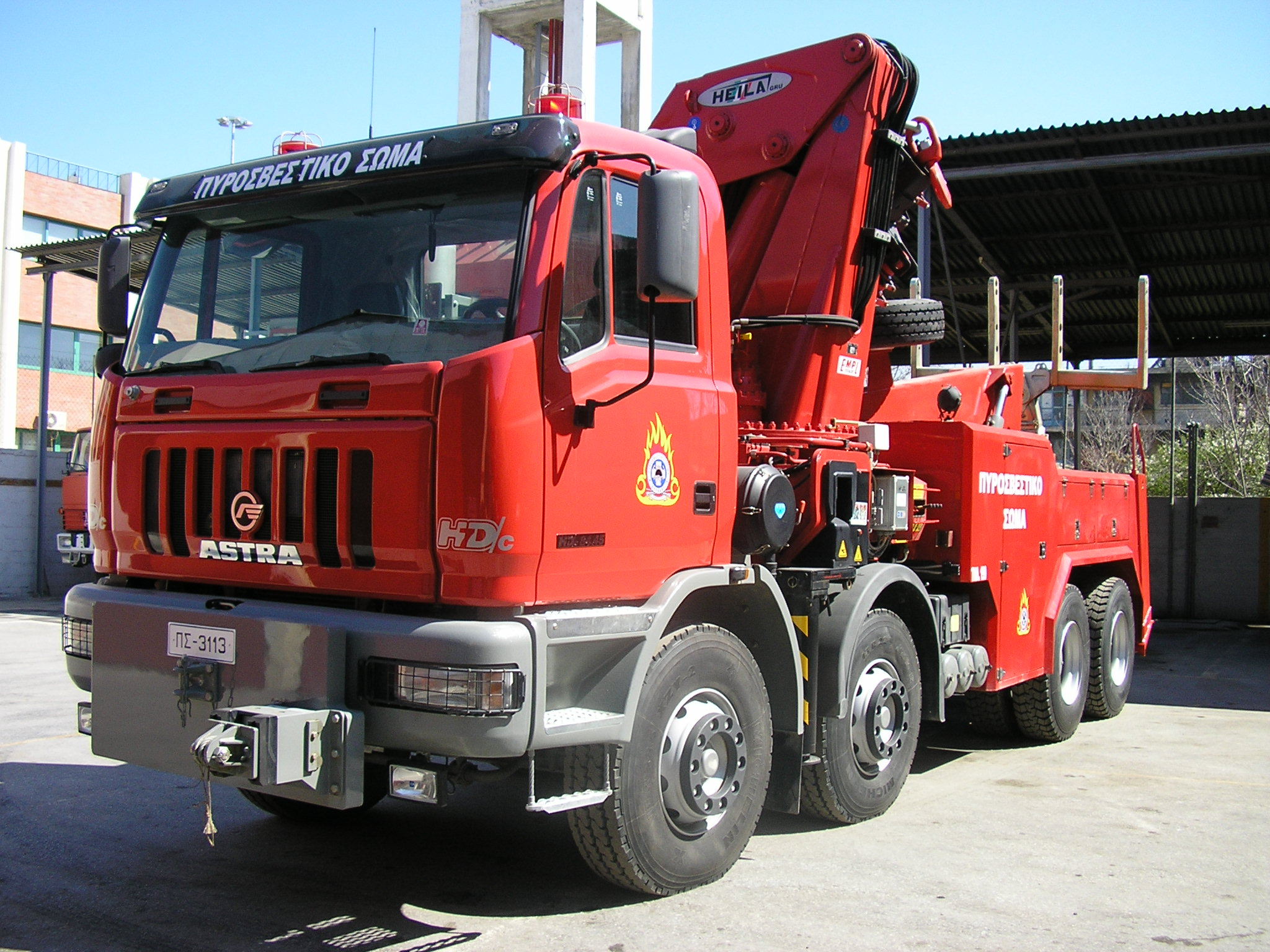
Astra HD7C 84-45 tow truck of the Fire Service of Greece.

The Corps mission is to provide safety for the citizens and their property. It operates during fires, forest fires, car accidents, other natural or man-made disasters and during rescue operations. Other duties include the collaboration with the other Greek security forces, prevention measures and information and the education of the public. The Fire Corps has officers serving with the National Intelligence Service of Greece. The nation's domestic and foreign intelligence service. The different legal and regulatory texts describing the organization and operation of the Fire Service were codified in 1992 in Presidential Decree 210. Emergency Medical Services in Greece are the responsibility of EKAB - The Hellenic National Centre for Emergency Care.

E.M.A.K. stands for the Special Unit Dealing with Catastrophes. E.M.A.K. is the Heavy USAR and Technical Rescue unit of the Corps. Additionally, E.M.A.K. staffs teams of Scuba Divers. The Unit reports directly to the Lieutenant General of the Fire Corps.

Regional Administrative Services are divided into 300 commands. County Fire Service Commands and City Fire Service Commands based on size. These commands are composed of multiple fire stations. Fire Stations are primarily operational action stations. Stations are divided into A, B, C and D class, depending on the population and the danger of the area where they are located. The Fire Stations of Ports and Airports, both Civil and Military, belong to these services. Fire stations smaller than D class are referred to as klimakia. Plus voluntary fire stations and voluntary klimakia. Fire Apparatus are divided into A, B, C and D class depending on their pumping capacity.

== Organization ==
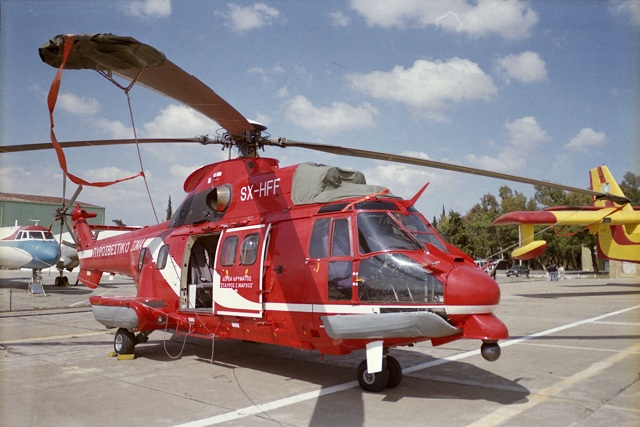
HFC Super Puma helicopter SX-HFF

1. The central body is located in Athens
2. Regional Fire Services Administration
3. Fire station of four grades (A, B, C, D) throughout the country
4. Smaller fire stations (klimakia), plus voluntary fire stations and voluntary klimakia
5. Special Units for Disasters (EMAK)
6. Special services:
  1. Firefighting Academy
  2. National Coordination Centre for Operations and Crisis Management (ESKEDIK). Tel. 199
  3. General Warehouse Material
  4. Confrontation of arson crimes - Directorate for Dealing with Arson Crimes (D.A.E.E.)
  5. The Air Service of the Fire Corps (Y.E.M.P.S.)
  6. The Watercraft Service (Y.PLO.M.)

== Voluntary Corps ==
In 1991, a new Voluntary Corps was formed for volunteers Today they are 17% of the strength of the Service. Volunteers act as a support force and they have to be officially recognized and trained by the Greek state. The legal and regulatory framework for volunteers in the Hellenic Fire Corps and the Hellenic Coast Guard was updated with Law 4029 in 2011. The mission of the Volunteer Firefighter is the safety and protection of the life and property of citizens and the state. Crews of volunteers respond to the dangers of fires, floods, earthquakes, other natural disasters and accidents. The role is delimited in the context of the honorary and unpaid offer of the citizens exclusively. Only in the context of the Fire Corps' operation. They are trained in branches of the Fire Academy throughout Greece. Crews of volunteers serve in Professional and Volunteer Fire Stations and intervene in structural and wildland fires. These voluntary structures are administratively and operationally subordinate to the Service of the Fire Corps in which they are based. Based on the provisions of the law, the Volunteer Fire Brigades can operate on an annual or seasonal basis in order to meet the needs of fire safety and rescue. In particular, voluntary crews can be formed at the level of Local Government Organizations and Holy Monasteries, giving specific incentives in this direction. Crews can be raised in locations where there are no professional fire services, such as in remote Greek islands.

== Equipment ==
Since the 1930s, the Fire Service has used more than 3,500 vehicles. Today it owns about 2,500 trucks and cars (1,500 fire engines and fire tenders, 800 auxiliary and 200 special), 44 firefighting aircraft, 20 helicopters (5 belonging to the House and 15 leased) and 10 firefighting vessels. The Hellenic Air Force assists with the operation of fixed-wing aircraft. Post-war, the Corps supplied armoured firefighting tanks manufactured by ERF. In 1998 all Forest Service vehicles were transferred to the Fire Corps.

Firefighters wear bright blue turnout coats with Silver Gallet helmets. The uniform is dark blue. Fire Apparatus are divided into A, B, C and D classes based on their pumping capacity. The callsigns are the Class followed by the number of units in the Command. A-38 indicates the 38th Rescue Pumper in Athens.

| Type | Class |
|---|---|
| A | Urban Pumper - Brush Patrol |
| B | Wildland Four Wheel Drive Tanker |
| C | Foam Tanker |
| D | Bulk Water Carrier |
| "Brace" | Aerial Ladder Platform |
| Crane | Crane |
| Stairlift | Turntable Ladder |
| Diving Team Vehicle | E.M.A.K. Scuba Team |
| Rescue Dog Transport | E.M.A.K. Canine Team |
| Mountaineering Team | Search and Rappel Team |
| Multi-Mission Vehicle | Hagglund Tracked Pumper |
| Life Savers | E.M.A.K. Technical Rescue Unit |
| Chemical Toxic Collection and Separation | HazMat Decon Unit |

== Training ==
The training takes place at the Firefighting Academy (Pyrosvestiki Akademia) which is located in Kato Kifissia (38°04′55″N 23°47′18″E) with an annex at Villia Attikis. The first "Firefighting School" was established in 1936 at Sarri Street (an outpost of the 1st Fire Station) in Athens, while the academy was established in 1968.

== Ranks ==
| Title | Fire Lieutenant General | Fire Major General | Fire Brigadier | Fire Colonel | Fire Lieutenant Colonel | Fire Major | Fire Captain | Fire Lieutenant | Fire Second Lieutenant |
|---|---|---|---|---|---|---|---|---|---|
| Greek title | Αντιστράτηγος Πυροσβεστικού Σώματος; Antistrátigos Pyrosvestikoú Sómatos | Υποστράτηγος Πυροσβεστικού Σώματος; Ypostrátigos Pyrosvestikoú Sómatos | Αρχιπύραρχος; Archipýrarchos | Πύραρχος; Pýrarchos | Αντιπύραρχος; Antipýrarchos | Επιπυραγός; Epipyragós | Πυραγός; Pyragós | Υποπυραγός; Ypopyragós | Ανθυποπυραγός; Anthypopyragós |
| Insignia | | | | | | | | | |

| Title | Chief Warrant Officer | Warrant Officer | Fire Master Sergeant | Fire Sergeant | Senior Firefighter | Firefighter |
|---|---|---|---|---|---|---|
| Greek title | Πυρονόμος Παραγωγικής Σχολής; Pyronómos Paragogikís Scholís | Πυρονόμος Μη Παραγωγικής Σχολής; Pyronómos Mi Paragogikís Scholís | Αρχιπυροσβέστης Παραγωγικής Σχολής; Archipyrosvéstis Paragogikís Scholís | Αρχιπυροσβέστης Μη Παραγωγικής Σχολής; Archipyrosvéstis Mi Paragogikís Scholís | Υπαρχιπυροσβέστης; Yparchipyrosvéstis | Πυροσβέστης; Pyrosvéstis |
| Insignia | | | | | | |

== Gallery ==
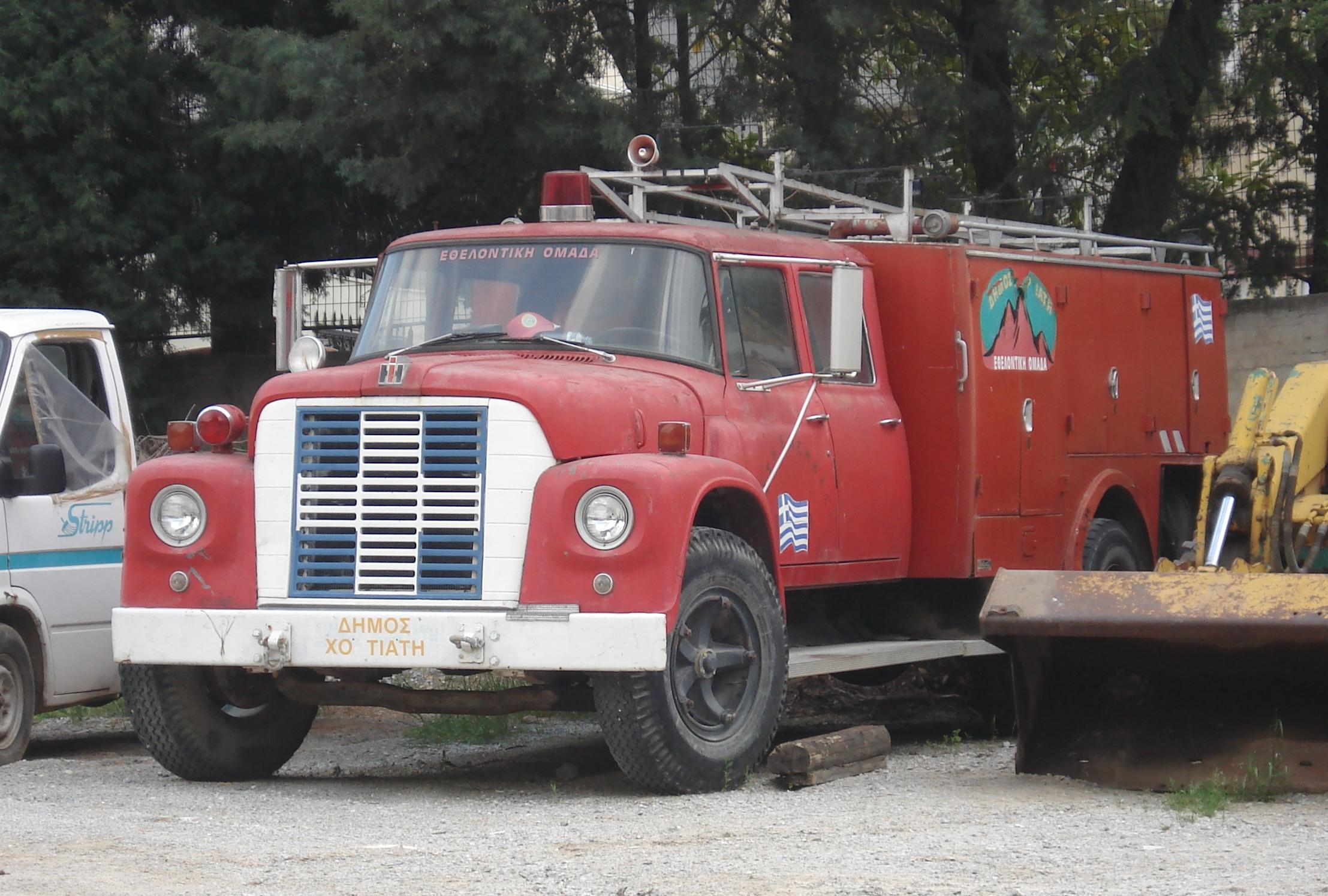
Old TEMAX fire-fighting vehicle

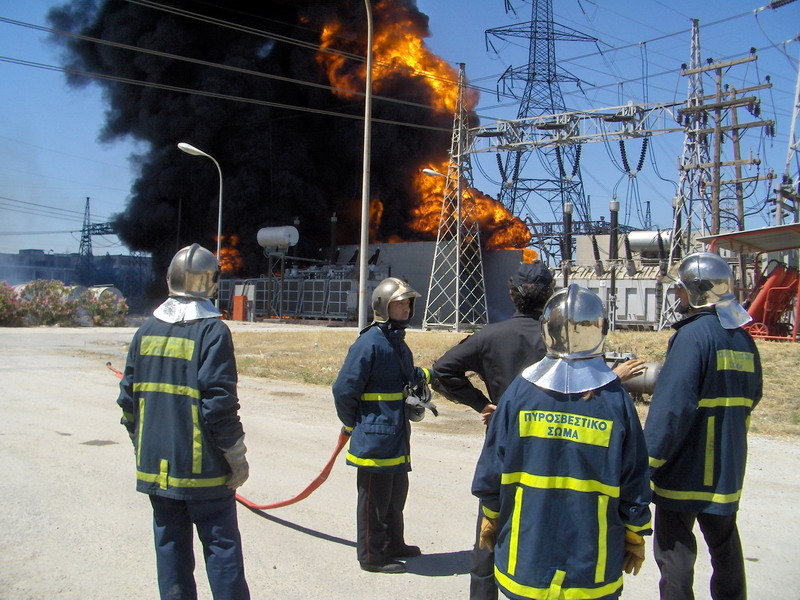
Fire in ultra-high voltage transformer

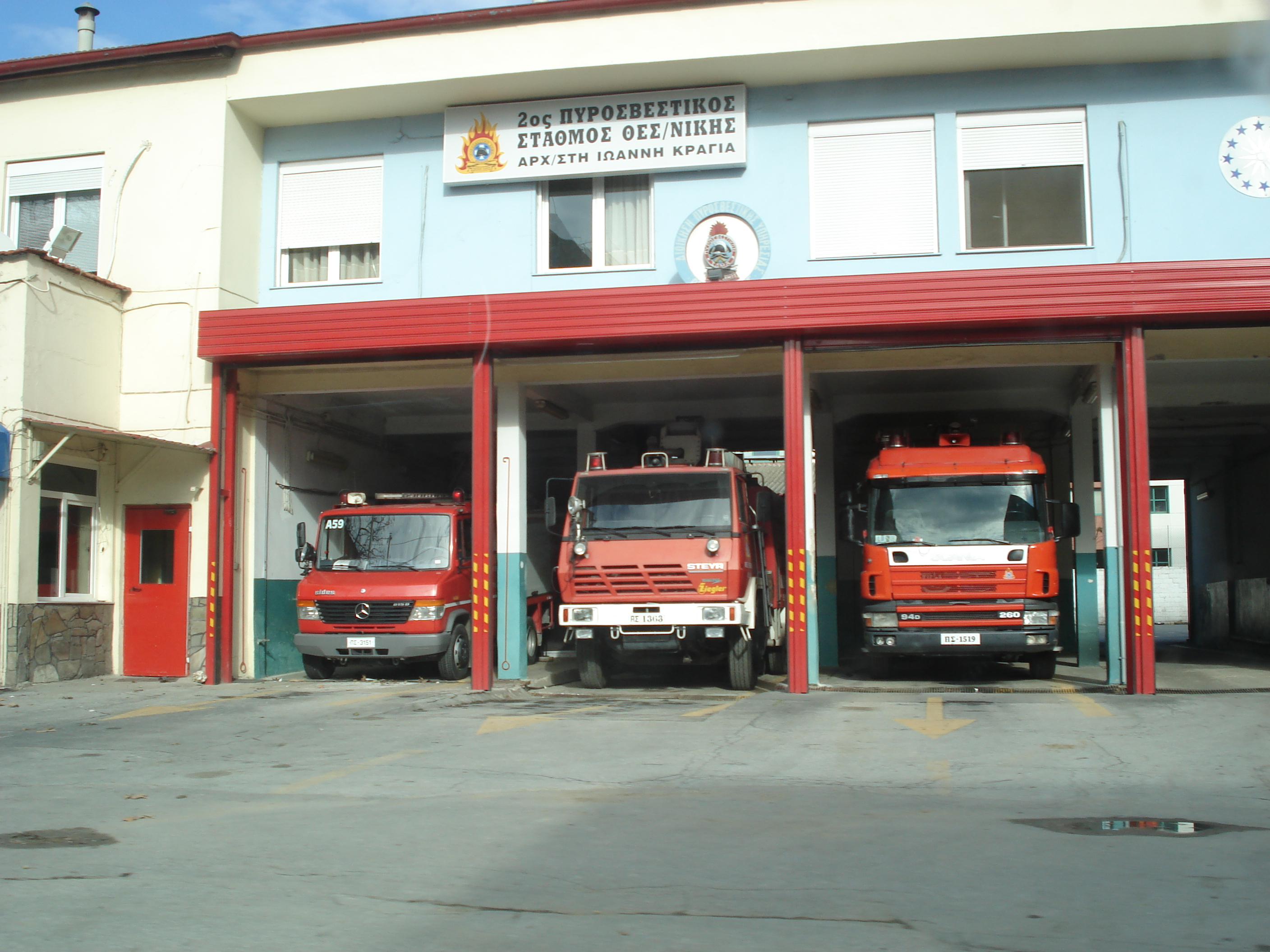
Fire station in Thessaloniki

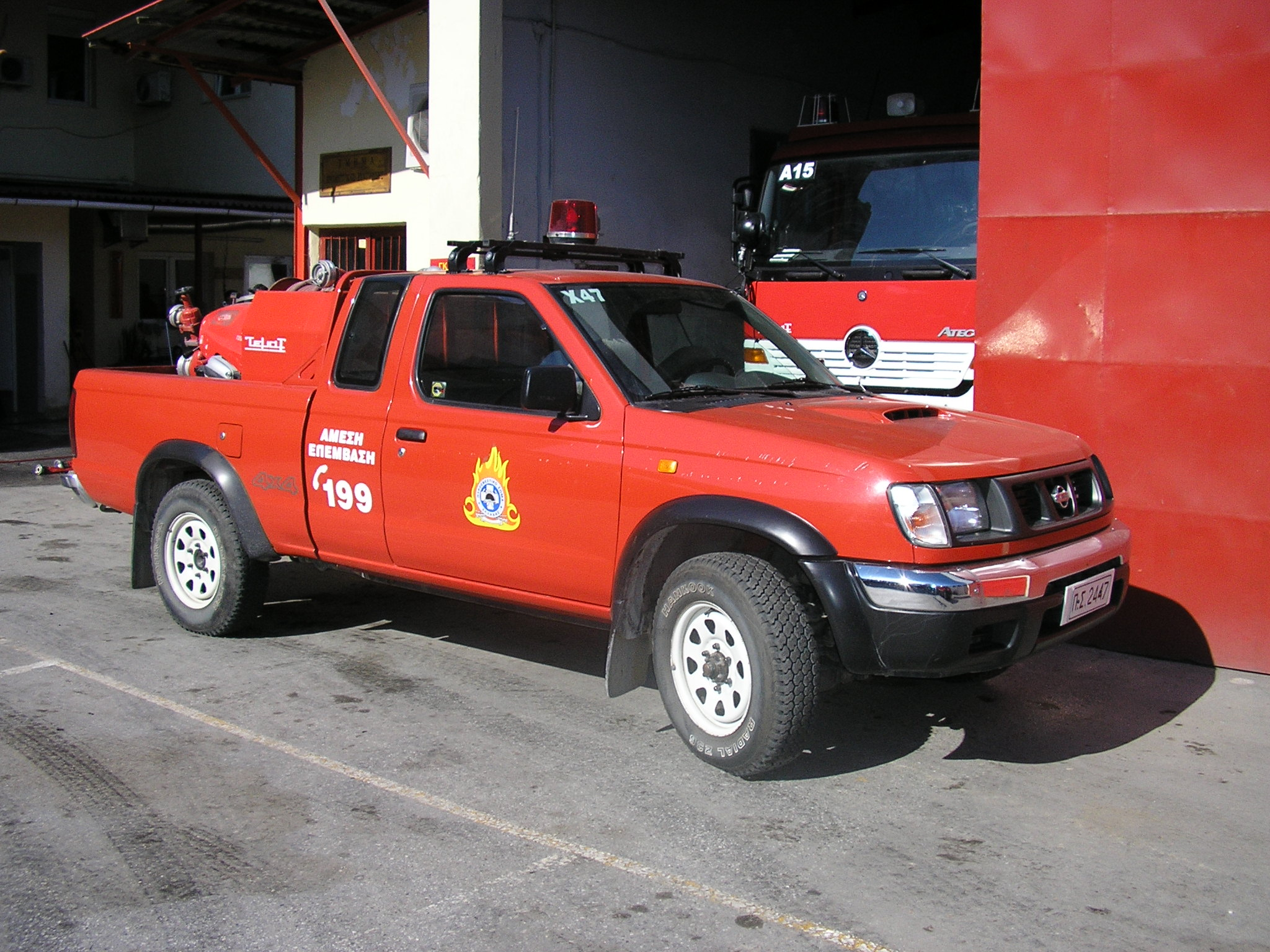
HFC automobile

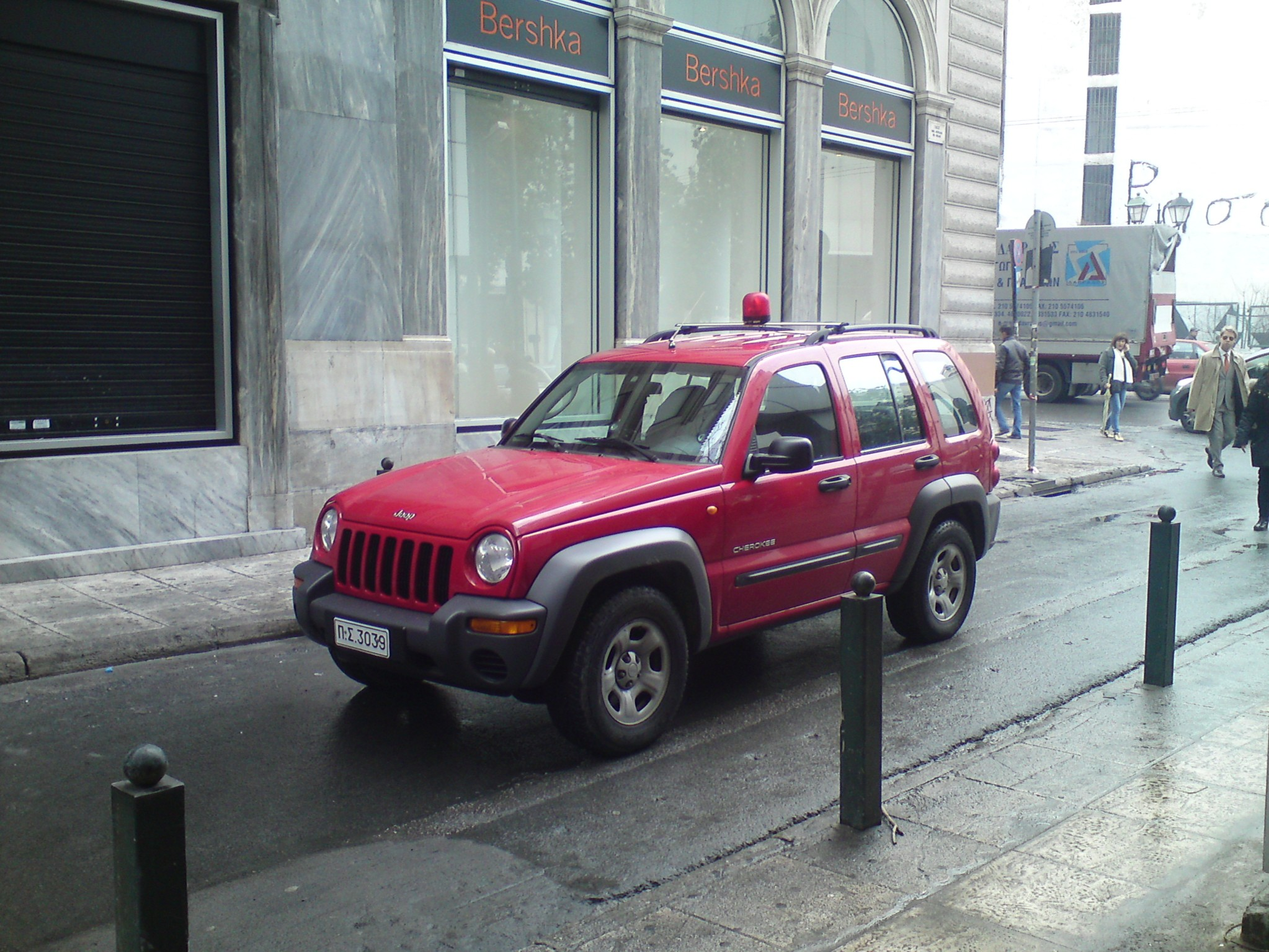
HFC Jeep

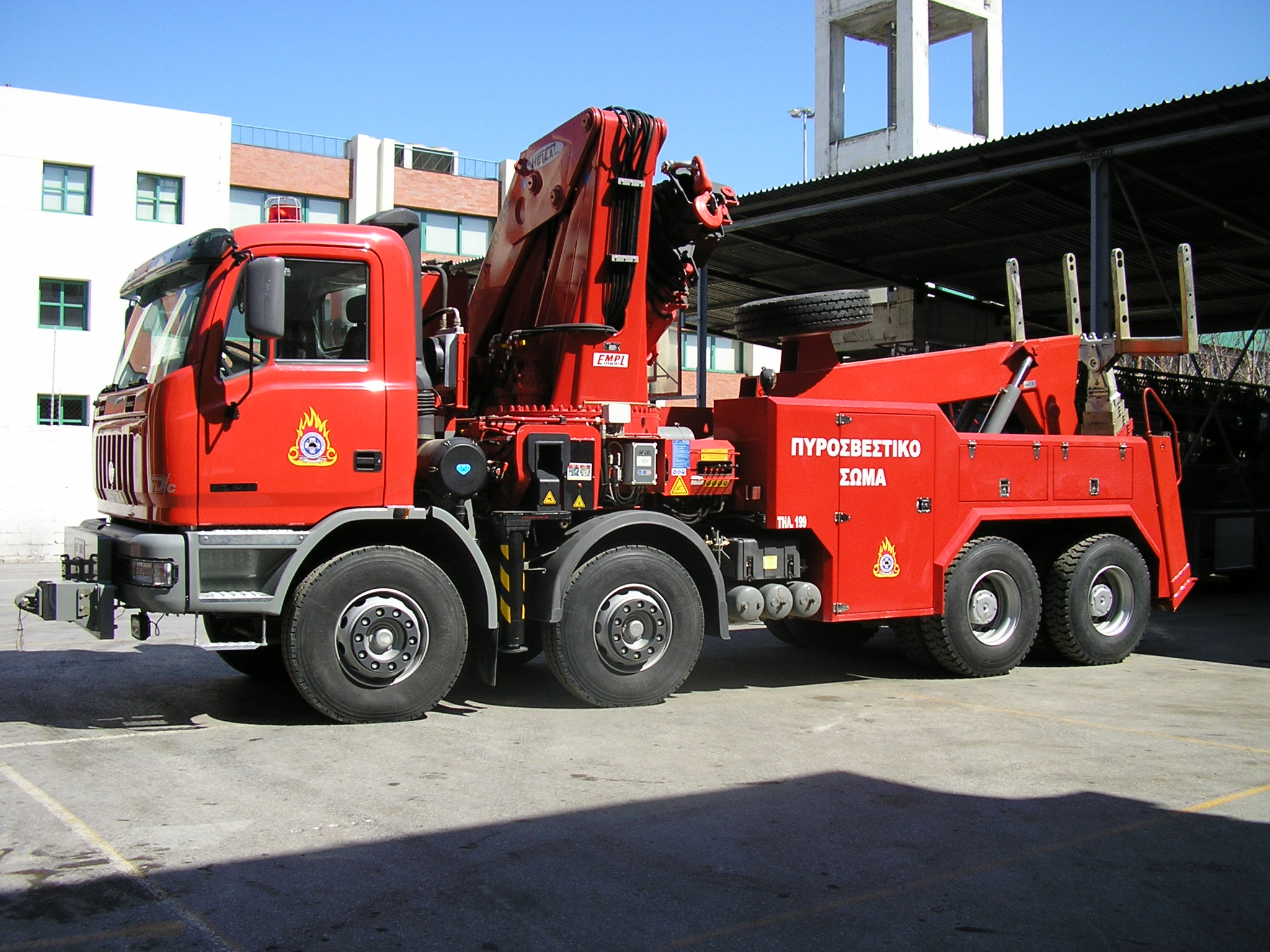
HFC vehicle

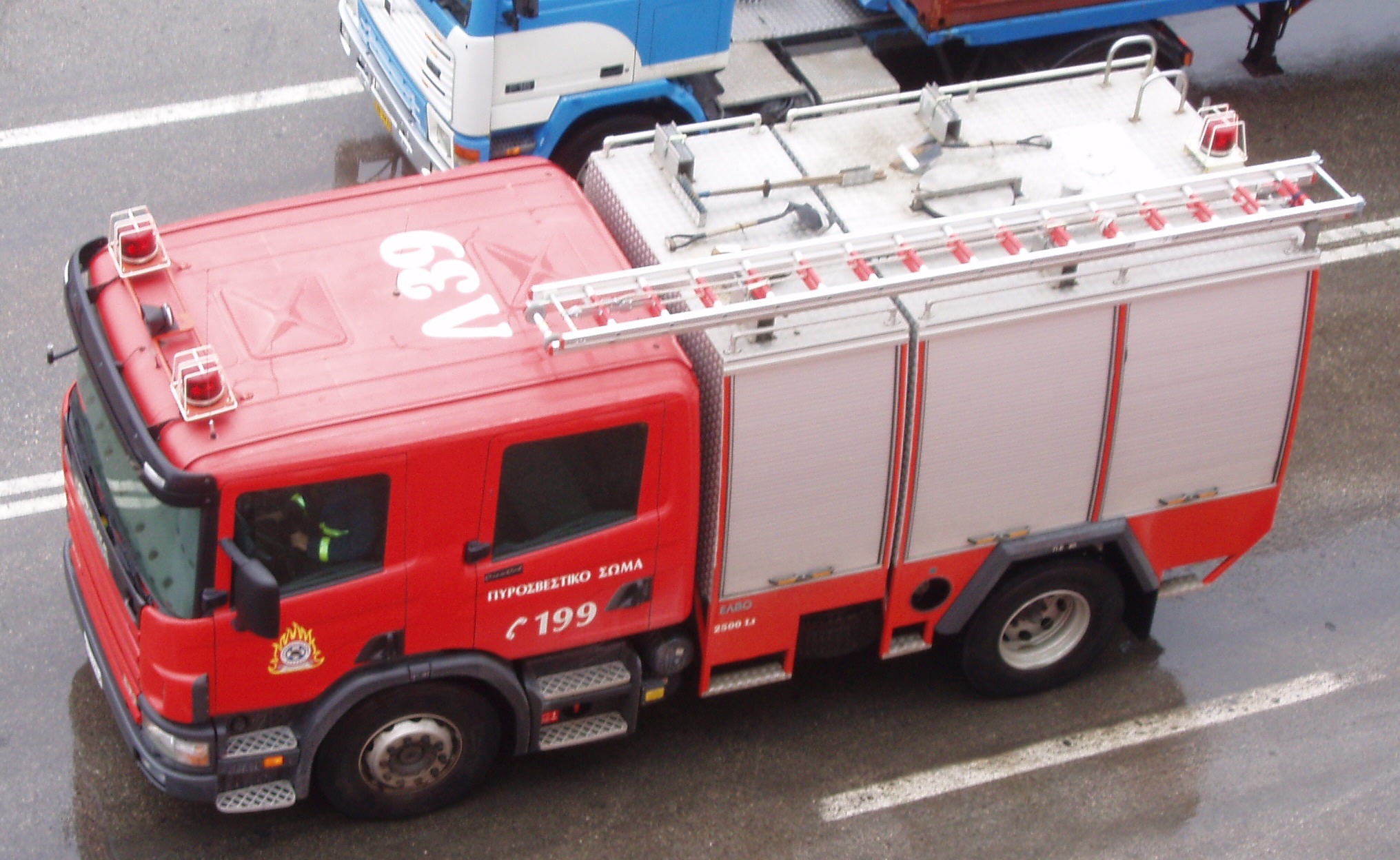
ELVO fire engine

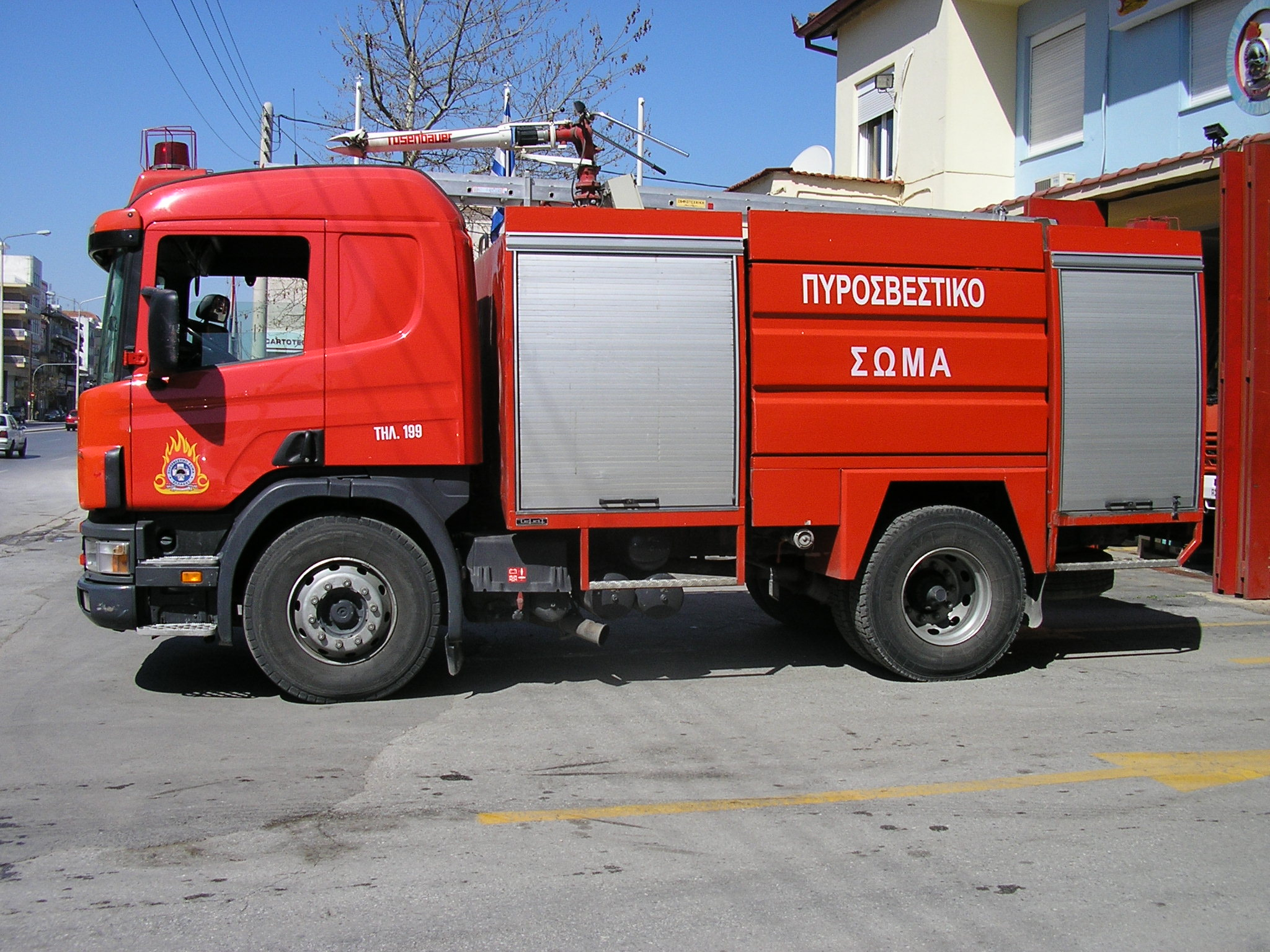
TEMAX fire engine

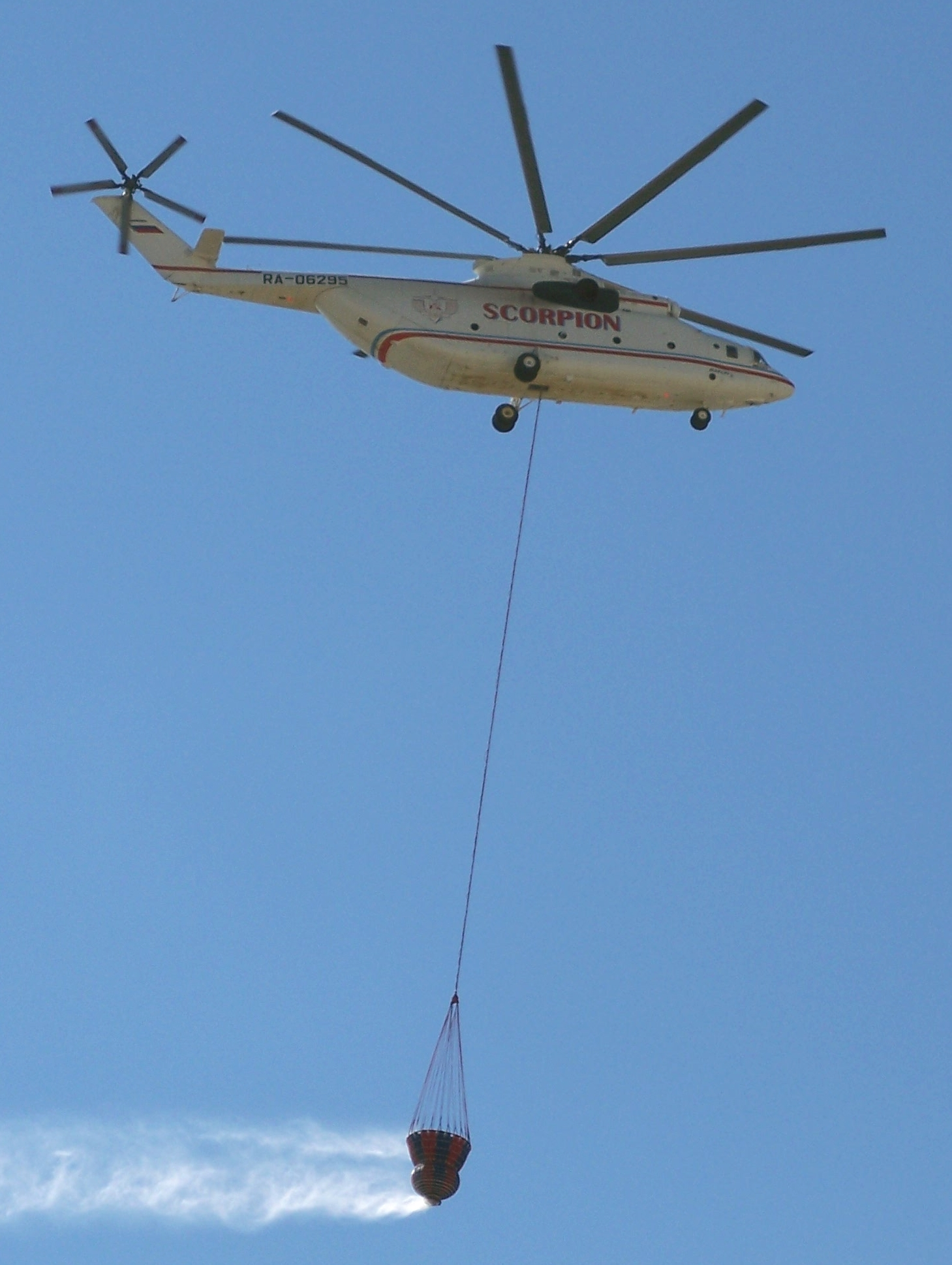
A Mil Mi-26TC in firefighter role in action

== See also ==
- Hellenic Police
- Hellenic Coast Guard
- List of fire departments
