= List of Texas fire departments =

This following is a list of all professional and volunteer-professional combination fire departments within Texas. These departments are regulated by the Texas Commission on Fire Protection.

Department Name	City	Number of Personnel
Houston Fire Department	Houston, Texas	3,930
Dallas Fire-Rescue Department	Dallas, Texas	1,823
San Antonio Fire Department	San Antonio, Texas	1,637
Austin Fire Department	Austin, Texas	1,102
Fort Worth Fire Department	Fort Worth, Texas	893
El Paso Fire Department	El Paso, Texas	857
Corpus Christi Fire Department	Corpus Christi, Texas	371
Lubbock Fire Department	Lubbock, Texas	362
Laredo Fire Department	Laredo, Texas	339
Irving Fire Department	Irving, Texas	318
Plano Fire Department	Plano, Texas	314
Arlington Fire Department	Arlington, Texas	307
Amarillo Fire Department	Amarillo, Texas	279
Garland Fire Department	Garland, Texas	257
Beaumont Fire-Rescue Department	Beaumont, Texas	235
Dallas/Fort Worth Airport	DFW Airport	224
Grand Prairie Fire Department	Grand Prairie, Texas	201
Midland Fire Department	Midland, Texas	198
Waco Fire Department	Waco, Texas	209
Mesquite Fire Department	Mesquite, Texas	196
Killeen Fire Department	Killeen, Texas	250
Brownsville Fire Department	Brownsville, Texas	177
Abilene Fire Department	Abilene, Texas	170
Frisco Fire Department	Frisco, Texas	164
Odessa Fire Department	Odessa, Texas	164
South Montgomery County Fire Department	Conroe, Texas	156
Wichita Falls Fire Department	Wichita Falls, Texas	156
Grapevine Fire Department	Grapevine, Texas	104
Lancaster Fire Department	Lancaster, Texas	56
Marshall Fire Department	Marshall, Texas	51
