= Gebocyl =

Spanish firefighter's organization

Gebocyl is the "Grupo de Especialistas Bomberos de Castilla y Leon". It is a Spanish professional firefighter's organization on 24-hour stand-by to help with rescue missions around the world. The group was established in 2003, and by 2005 numbered over 150 professionals.

== Background ==
They made headlines when they were sent on January 13, 2010 to Haiti as part of the rescue mission after the 2010 Haiti earthquake. They rescued toddler Redjeson Hausteen Claude from the rubble and reunited him with his family on January 15, 2010. In 2019, the child visited Castilla y León, the community from which the firefighters were from.
