= Isfahan Fire and Safety Department =

Operational area
- Country: Iran

Facilities and equipment
- Divisions: 4

Website
- https://ifso125.ir/

Isfahan Fire and Safety Department of Isfahan Municipality سازمان آتش نشانی و خدمات ایمنی شهر اصفهان operate through 27 fire stations and one staff offices in Isfahan city based in Bozorgmehr bridge square. It has the only fire lab in Iran or West Asia.

It falls under the direction of Iranian ستاد حوادث غیر مترقبه National Disaster Management Organization.

The department offers training to organizations and schools. شورای سازمان

The organization includes 300 active firefighters.

Average fire team response time is reportedly 4 minutes and women are not allowed.

The department serve Iraqi cities as well. There is a separate phone number for disabled people.

== Departmental organization ==
- Board of director
- CEO's Office
- Security
- Legal
- Deputies
- Communication, Dispatch

== Equipment list ==
- Ten 250 cc bikes
- 11 hilux toyota motor vehicle
- 20 light fire engines
- Twenty ISUZU SUV
- 1 carrier
- 2 BackHoe loader
- Ten Hyundai SUV
- One 40 meters ladder
- UAV drones
- Hazmat
