= List of Tennessee fire departments =

The following is a list of notable fire departments in Tennessee:

- City of Knoxville Fire Department
- East Sullivan County Volunteer Fire Department
- Memphis Fire Services
- Nashville Fire Department
