= List of Georgia fire departments =

The following is a list of fire departments in the U.S. state of Georgia:

- Action Fire Protection
- Adairsville Fire Department
- Adel Fire Department
- Adrian Fire Department
- Alamo Fire Department
- Albany Fire Department
- Alma Fire Department
- Ambrose Fire Department
- Americus Fire Department
- Appling Fire Department
- Arcade Volunteer Fire Department
- Atlanta Fire Rescue Department
- Augusta Fire Department
- Bern Volunteer Fire Department
- Cherokee County Fire & Emergency Services
- Cobb County Fire & Emergency Services
- Columbia County Fire Rescue (Class 1)
- Columbus Fire and EMS*
- Commerce Volunteer Fire Department
- DeKalb County Fire and Rescue
- Forsyth County Fire Department
- Gwinnett County Fire & Emergency Services
- Harrisburg Volunteer Fire Department
- Jackson Trail Fire Department
- Jackson County Correctional Institute Fire Department
- Jefferson Fire Department
- Maysville Area Volunteer Fire Department
- Nicholson Fire and Rescue Department
- North Jackson Volunteer Fire Department
- Plainview Volunteer Fire Department
- Port Wentworth Fire Department
- Savannah Fire & Emergency Services
- Smyrna Fire Department
- South Jackson Fire Department
- West Jackson Fire Department
