= Karachi Fire Department =

Karachi Fire Department is responsible for the provision of fire protection in the city of Karachi, Sindh, Pakistan. Karachi Fire Department as well as responding to building collapses, drowning cases, gas leakage, oil spillage, road and rail accidents, bird and animal rescues, fallen trees and taking appropriate action during natural calamities.

The Fire Departments of Pakistan inherited its first Fire Department Building in 1947 right after the independence of Pakistan in 1947. The Central Fire Brigade was later called ‘Al-Markaz’ and was located near the Civil Hospital Karachi. The building has since been renovated only in 1976.

The documentary specially focuses on 15 January 2007 when eight firemen were buried and burned alive in a burning cotton factory at the Site Industrial Area of Karachi. Pakistanis mourned the loss and the viewers explore first hand the emotional turmoil which these families had to deal with and how some of the firemen barely escaped death. As the firemen talk about the uncertainty of their lives and the medical services they get, the viewers will get a unique insight into the lives of these selfless individuals.

The Mayor of Karachi, Syed Mustafa Kamal admits that the CFS needs more equipment and resolves to do so. The CFS has been battling many a challenges in the past few years, some of which have been discussed in the documentary; the reason for its appeal in the country.

Important focus has also been on the PNSC fire. The 15-storey Pakistan National Shipping Corporation building caught fire on Sunday, 18 February 2007 in Karachi, leaving at least two firefighters injured and destroying a large number of valuable documents. The PNSC building, which was built in the early 1970s, has seen the second outbreak of a fire in seven months. The 18 Feb fire 'believed to have been caused by a short circuit' destroyed official records of the National Engineering Services of Pakistan. But this was not the first fire the PNSC building would endure.

The second fire broke out on 19 August just a few months after the first one. This time Manager Administration officer suffered a fatal heart attack at the scene after witnessing the inferno. Two navy helicopters were used in rescue operations and one man who was working on a mobile phone tower on the roof was rescued.

== See also ==
- List of fire departments
