= Kyoto City Fire Department =

Fire department of Kyoto City, Japan

- 京都市消防局
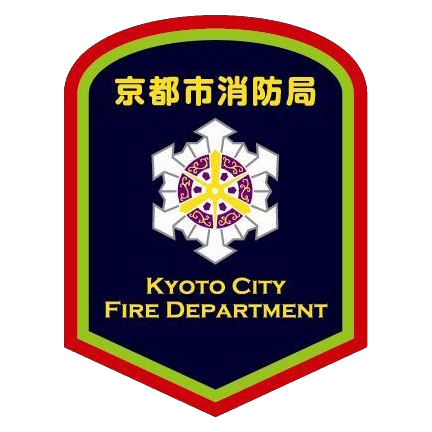
- The badge of the Kyoto City Fire Department

Operational area
- Country: Japan
- Prefecture: Kyoto
- City: Kyoto
- Address: 450-2, Enokicho, Nakagyō-ku
- Coordinates: 35°00′44.7″N 135°46′06.1″E

Agency overview
- Established: 1948
- Annual calls: 109,609 (2023)
- Employees: 1,523 (2023)
- Annual budget: ¥21,920,000,000 (2024)
- Staffing: Career
- Fire Chief: Kenichirō Iwami (2024)

Facilities and equipment
- Stations: 11 (+ 1 sub-station)
- Branch Stations: 35

Website
- https://www.city.kyoto.lg.jp/shobo/

The Kyoto City Fire Department (Japanese: 京都市消防局, Hepburn: Kyōto-shi Shōbōkyoku) is the fire department of Kyoto City, Japan. Formed in 1948 during the post-war reorganisation of Japan's government, the KCFD is today the sixth-largest fire department in Japan by number of firefighters, operating out of their headquarters in Nakagyō Ward and their 47 fire stations and branch stations spread across the city.

In the 2023 financial year, the KCFD responded to 220 fires (of which 71% were building fires), 103,059 calls for emergency medical services, 1,317 technical rescue operations, and 823 other emergency calls, as well as 6,918 false alarm callouts, and 3,644 malicious callouts.

Kyoto is a very safe city in terms of fire; in 2022, it had the lowest rate of fire of any major city in Japan. Unique challenges are posed to firefighters in the city by the need to preserve important cultural properties during fire and rescue operations, with volunteer firefighters and community groups being widely employed to fulfil this salvage requirement.

== History ==
The date of creation of the first firefighting organization in Kyoto is not known, but by the 17th century a dual system of public and private brigades had come into being. The public buke bikeshi (武家火消) samurai fire brigade was largely concerned with protecting the property of the emperor, such as the Imperial Palace, from fire, whereas the private tana bikeshi (店火消) brigades were hired by civic organizations in local neighbourhoods to engage in general firefighting.

These private brigades were replaced in 1722 when a volunteer machi bikeshi (町火消) service was established by the town government, with the samurai brigade also coming under the command of the town government in 1779. In 1868 following the Meiji Restoration, the fire services of Kyoto were absorbed into the local police, as part of the consolidation of power that drove the police service during this time. In Kyoto, this led to the establishment of 7 fire stations by the year 1894, staffed by 619 police-firefighters.

While most other Japanese cities were subject to intense firebombing during the Pacific War, Kyoto was spared due to its historical and cultural value. Following the end of the war, firefighting in Japan was reorganised, creating the modern municipal fire department system; as a result, the Kyoto City Fire Department was created in 1948.

== Stations and apparatus ==
As is typical with Japanese fire departments, the KCFD is split into stations, with one station covering each of Kyoto's 11 wards (plus a substation), each consisting of a large main station building as well as several branch stations throughout the ward. The 11 stations and 1 substation are:

- Kita Fire Station
- Kamigyō Fire Station
- Nakagyō Fire Station (co-located with the department's headquarters)
- Shimogyō Fire Station
- Minami Fire Station
- Nishikyō Fire Station
- Ukyō Fire Station
- Sakyō Fire Station
- Higashiyama Fire Station
- Yamashina Fire Station
- Fushimi Fire Station
- Daigo Fire Sub-Station

In addition to its 11 stations and 1 substation, the KCFD also operates an aviation unit from its helipad in Fushimi.

== Notable incidents ==
As well as contributing to national and international emergencies through participation in the national Emergency Fire Rescue Teams and the International Rescue Team of the Japan Fire Service, the KCFD has tackled various notable emergencies within Kyoto, including:

- Kinkaku-ji arson attack (1950) - An arson attack by an aggrieved monk led to the destruction of the famous Kinkaku-ji Temple.
- Kyoto Animation arson attack (2019) - An arson attack on an animation studio killed 36 and injured 34 others, including the perpetrator.

== See also ==
- Kyoto Prefectural Police
- Kyoto City Government
