= Karnataka Fire and Emergency Services =

Indian emergency services department

Agency overview
- Established: 1964
- Fire chief: Sri. M.N.REDDI, IPS
- EMS level: BLS
- Motto: We Serve to Save

Facilities and equipment
- Stations: 168

Website
- www.karnataka.gov.in/ksfes/Pages/home.aspx

The Karnataka Fire and Emergency Services Department is a department of the Government of Karnataka that is the foremost disaster management body in Karnataka, India.

“The Karnataka State Fire and Emergency Services is headed by the Director General of Fire and Emergency Services, an IPS officer of Director General of Police (DGP) rank, appointed by the government. The Director General also serves as the Commandant General of Home Guards and as the Director General of the State Disaster Response Force and Civil Defence.

== Background ==
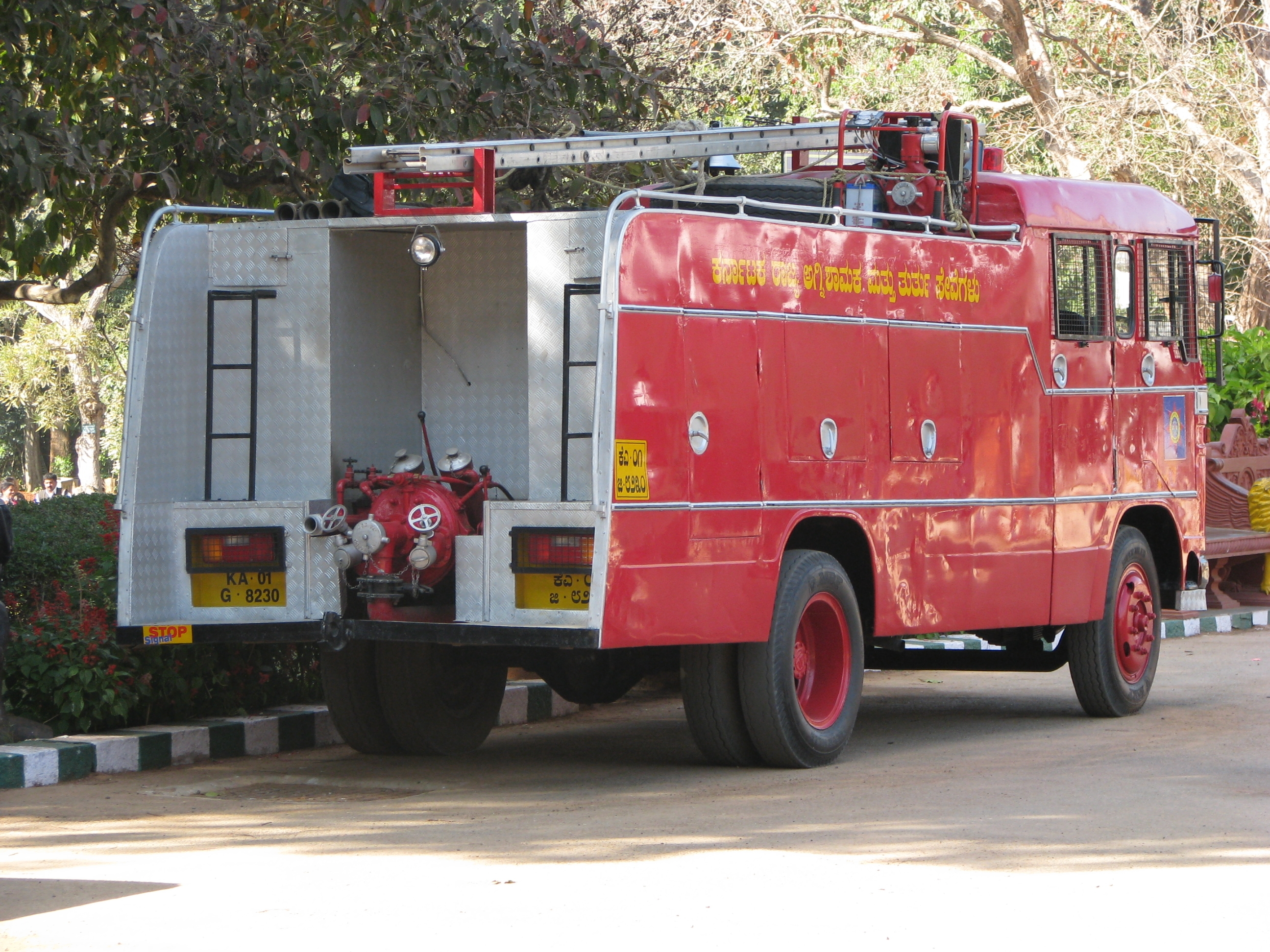
A fire truck in Bangalore

Fire and emergency services in Karnataka state were first established in 1942 A.D. in Bengaluru city under the administrative control of police department. After reorganisation of state in 1956 few more added in Mangaluru, Udupi, Ballari, Raichur and Hosapete. After enactment of Karnataka State Fire Services Act in 1964 C.E. Under the provisions of this Act, a separate Directorate of Fire & Emergency Services was created on 05-11-1965. All buildings in the state are required to obtain a compliance certificate for fire safety from the department. The department has the right to recommend the withdrawal of licences to commercial structures that do not have proper fire fighting equipment on their premises.

The department has a sanctioned strength of 6,448 personnel.

In 2009, the government announced that all taluks in the state would have fire stations. As of 2022 A.D., The KSFES department had 216 fire stations across 176 Taluks and 14 Hoblis in Karnataka, while 31 more were sanctioned in 2012. In 2011, Infosys built a 21,417-square-metre (230,530 sq ft) fire station at Hebbal, Mysore at a cost of ₹ 45 million for the department.

The department also owns rescue vans in Bangalore, Mangalore, Gulbarga, Mysore, Mandya, Chamrjanagar, and Hassan.

The department owns a pumper that was built by Dennis Brothers and delivered to the erstwhile Kingdom of Mysore in 1925 from England. It is the only petrol driven vehicle in the fleet and is brought out only during parades and rallies. The department also owns a Bronto Skylift to reach the higher storeys of tall buildings in Bangalore. The department owns similar equipment in the cities of Hubli and Mangalore. Due to the lack of working fire hydrants in Bangalore city, the department has acquired two high capacity water tankers to send in case of massive fires.

The department was one of the rescue agencies during the 2010 Mangalore air crash.

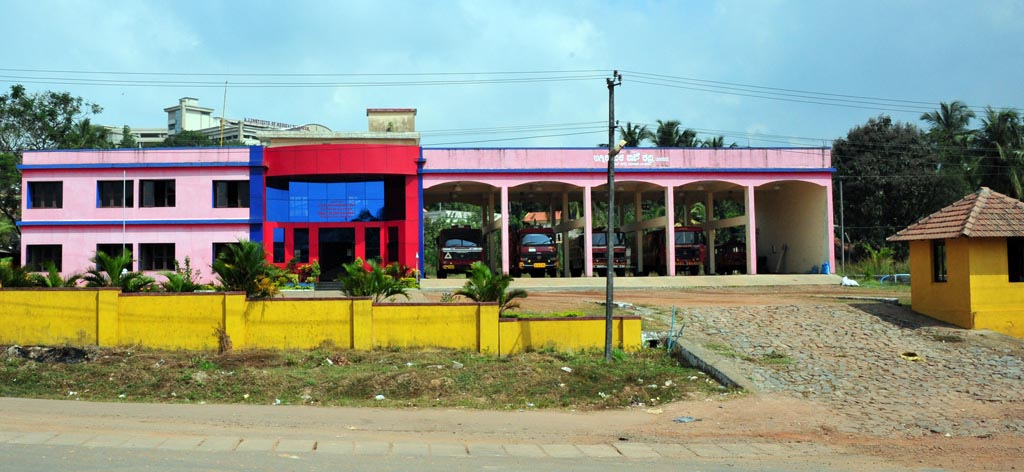
A fire station in Mangalore

== Criticism ==
A report released by the Comptroller and Auditor General of India stated that the department was ill-prepared to handle emergency situations due to the lack of standard operating procedures.

The department relies on groundwater reservoirs of the Bangalore Water Supply and Sewerage Board to fill water due to the lack of fire hydrants in Bangalore city. 400 fire hydrants have been reported to have gone missing since the 1980s.
