= Cork City Fire Brigade =

Irish fire rescue service

Operational area
- Country: Ireland
- City: Cork

Agency overview
- Established: 1877
- Annual calls: 3,019 (2018)
- Employees: 153
- Annual budget: €18.2m (2019)
- Chief Fire Officer: David Spillett

Facilities and equipment
- Stations: 3
- Engines: 4
- Platforms: 2
- Rescues: 1
- HAZMAT: 1
- Rescue boats: 1

Website
- Official website

The Cork City Fire Brigade (Irish: Briogáid Dóiteáin Chathair Chorcaí) is the local authority fire and rescue service for Cork City and its surrounding suburbs. It is a branch of Cork City Council. There are three fire stations in use by Cork City Fire Brigade; of which 2 are full-time and 1 is part time (retained). Cork City Fire Brigade is staffed by 153 active personnel, making it the second-biggest fire service in Ireland after the Dublin Fire Brigade.

In addition to its main purpose of firefighting, the Cork City Fire Brigade also deals with floods, road traffic collisions, trapped-in-lift releases, and other incidents such as those involving hazardous materials, major transport accidents and medical emergencies. It also conducts emergency planning in conjunction with other emergency services such as the Garda Síochána and performs fire safety inspections and education. It does not provide an ambulance service as this function is carried out in Cork City by the HSE National Ambulance Service, but since 2013 CCFB have taken on a medical role responding to all cardiac arrests in the Cork City area. All firefighters are trained to PHECC Emergency First Responder level and all of its fire engines carry first aid equipment including advanced airways and defibrillators.

== History ==
Organised Insurance Fire Brigades were established in the city following the Fire of Cork in 1622. Acts later passed in 1714 and 1715 made it mandatory for Church of Ireland parishes to provide 'small and large fire engines', but it was not until 1799 that the first effective fire engines were located in Cork. These were maintained by the privately run brigade of the Royal Exchange Assurance Company, and two more insurance brigades were also established - those of the Atlas and West of England. These brigades gradually declined in the 19th century, leaving the city in need of a dedicated fire service. This led to Cork Corporation forming Cork Fire Brigade in 1877. One of the most notable chapters in Cork Fire Brigade's history occurred in 1920, during the Irish War of Independence, with the Burning of Cork by British forces who hindered attempts to fight the conflagration and seriously wounded four firefighters with gunfire. The fire destroyed over 40 business premises and 300 residential properties, amounting to over five acres of the city. The Brigade entered into a new chapter of its history in 1923 with its first motor-pump being put into service, eventually leading to complete mechanization of the fleet and the withdrawal of the old horse-drawn equipment. Further changes occurred throughout the 20th century, including the opening of the brigade's present headquarters on Anglesea Street in 1975 and improvements in fire-fighting equipment and vehicles. Following the 2019 Cork boundary change, Cork City Fire Brigade saw the addition of another station at Ballincollig and a significantly increased area of responsibility.

== Stations and equipment ==
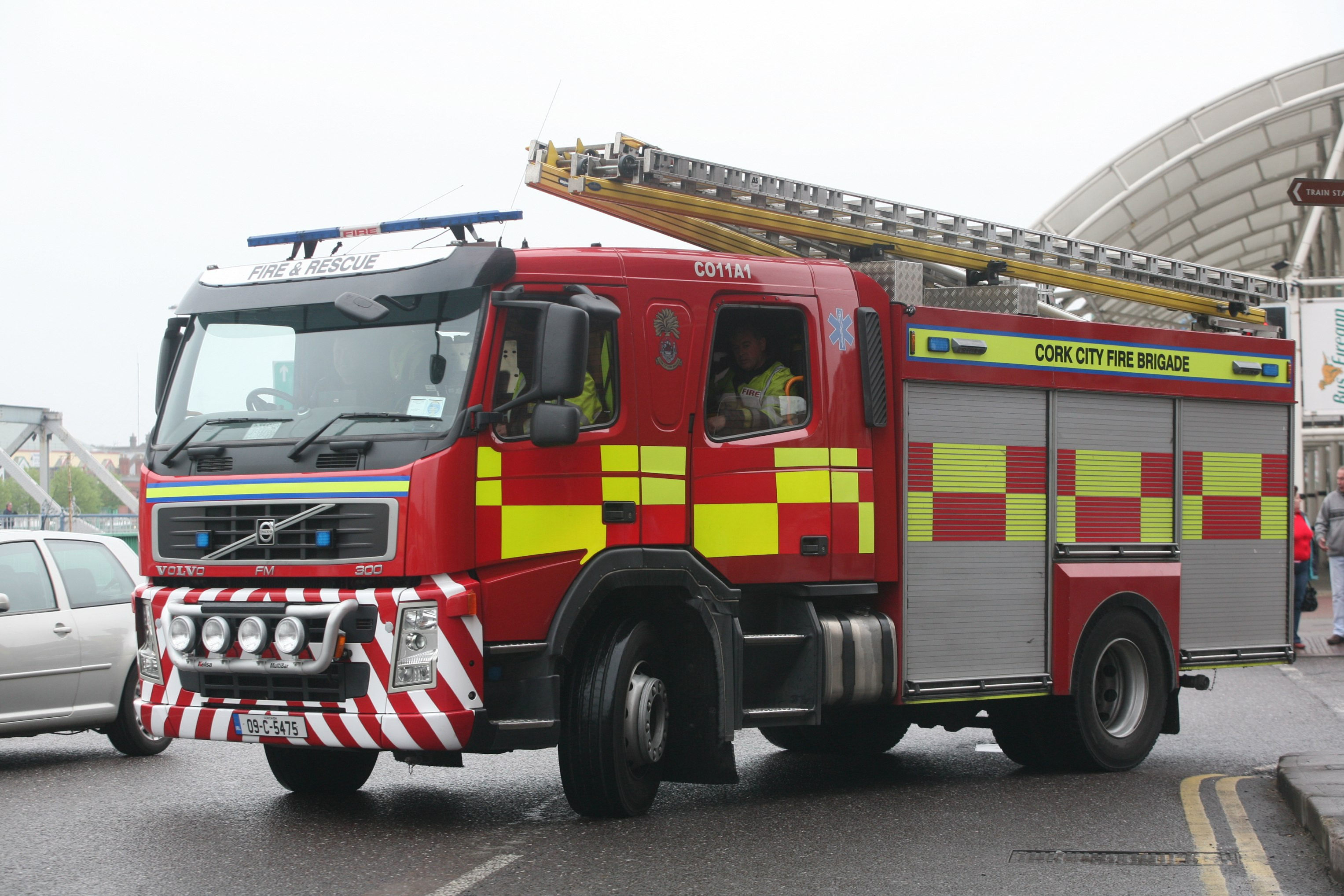
Water tender ladder of the Cork City Fire Brigade

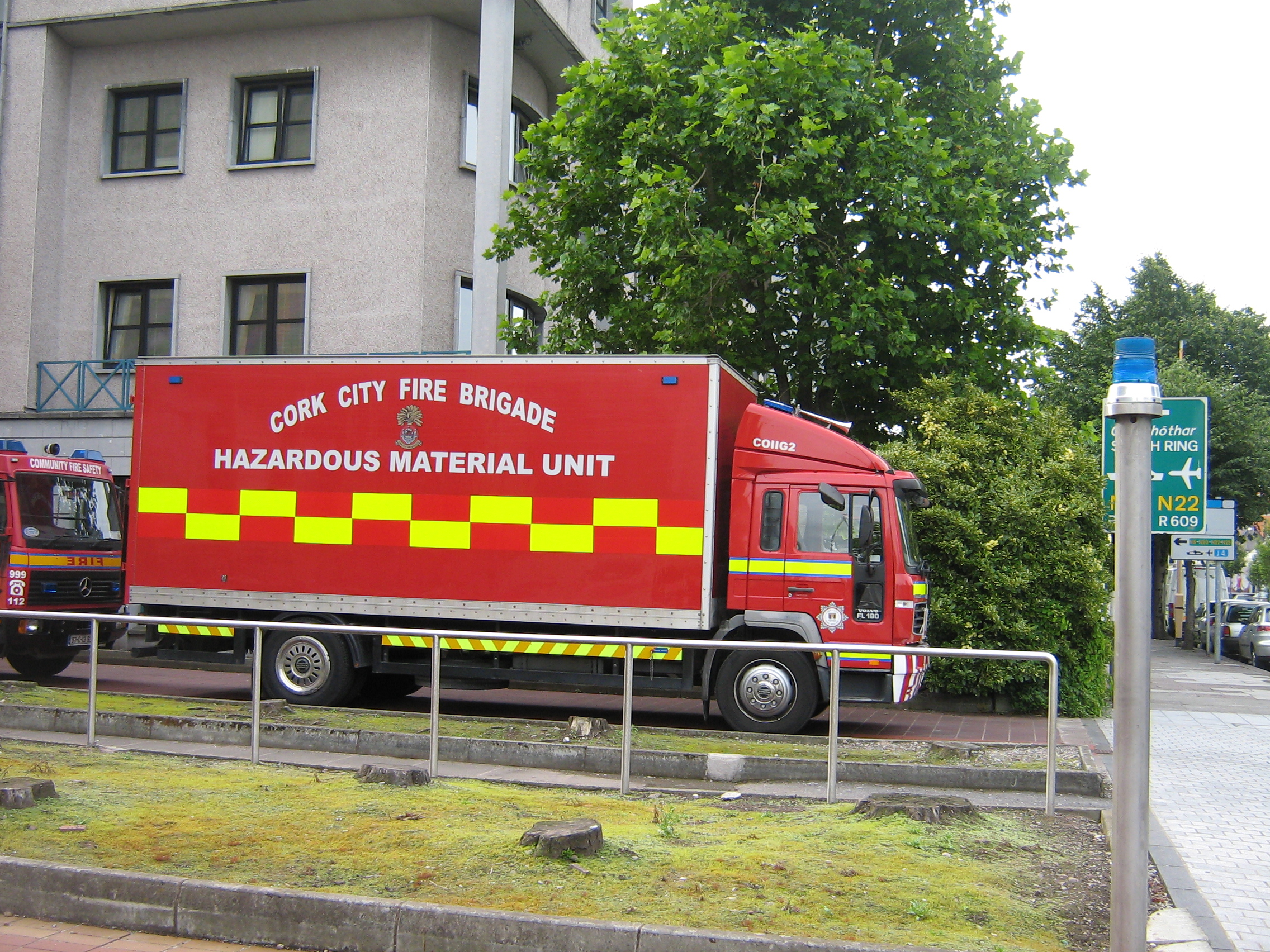
Hazardous material unit outside Anglesea Street station

Station Callsign	Station Name	Duty System	Appliances
Charlie Oscar 11	Anglesea Street	Wholetime	3x WtL, 1x ALP, 1x TL, 1x ET, 1 HMU, 1 WrC, 1x Control unit
Charlie Oscar 12	Ballyvolane	Wholetime	1x WtL
Charlie Oscar 13	Ballincollig	(Used for logistics and training)	

Cork City Fire Brigade operates three fire stations; Anglesea Street Station which is staffed by 112 firefighters (across 4 watches), Ballyvolane Station which is staffed by 28 firefighters (across 4 watches) and Ballincollig station which is used as a training and logistics center. As of 2026, funding was approved for a possible new fire station to the southwest of the city - possibly in the Curraheen area. Anglesea street and Ballyvolane stations operate in four watches; Blue, Red, Green and Amber. Cork City Fire Brigade firefighters work in a shift pattern of 9am to 6pm and 6pm to 9am on weekdays with 24 hours shifts on the weekends. The brigade is at the scene of 89% of fires within ten minutes and has the best performance overall in Ireland, with just over 1% of fires taking more than 20 minutes to reach.

== See also ==
- Dublin Fire Brigade
- Garda Síochána
- List of fire departments
- Civil Defence Ireland
- Irish Coast Guard
