= Tamil Nadu Fire and Rescue Services =

Fire department in Tamil Nadu, India

Agency overview
- Fire chief: Mr.Abhas Kumar IPS
- EMS level: Basic Life Support
- Motto: We Serve To Save

Facilities and equipment
- Stations: 331
- Ambulances: 33

Website
- tnfrs.tn.gov.in

The Tamil Nadu Fire and Rescue Services department is a service department of the Government of Tamil Nadu whose function is to fight fires and provide relief measures in times of calamities and disasters in Tamil Nadu.

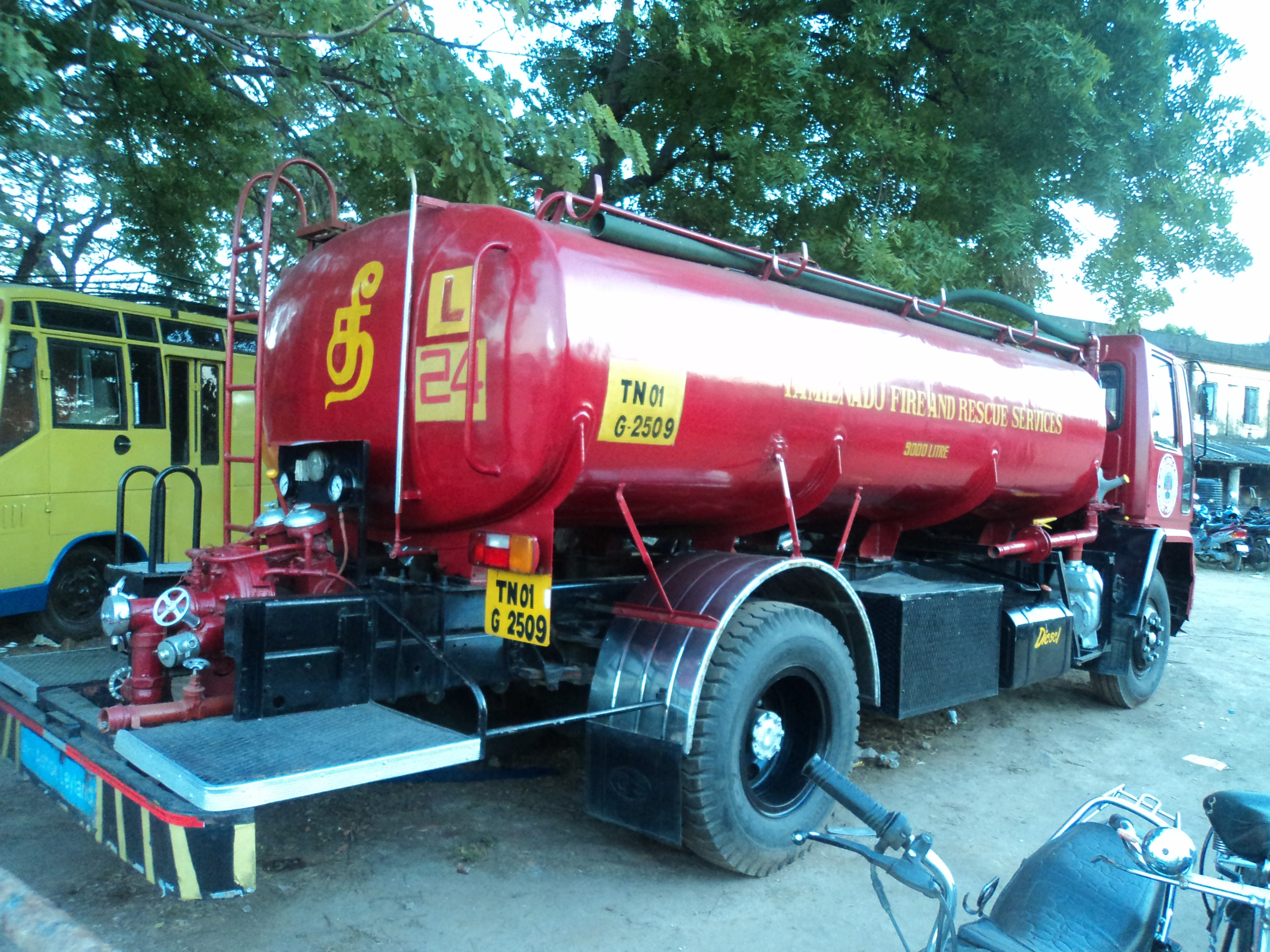
A fire truck in Chennai

Having 365 fire and rescue stations spread all over the state and 3 Rescue stations, one at Hogenekal, one at Kotagiri and other at Marina beach Marina Rescue station the department is currently the second largest in the country after the one in Uttar Pradesh. Currently, it has 7,347 personnel.

== History ==
Fire services in Tamil Nadu was introduced in 1908 with the formation of a Madras City Fire Brigade, a year after a major fire in the commissioner of revenue administration, land record office. Initially, the department comprised some steam or manually operated engines stationed in important parts, which were maintained by the Madras Corporation.

The organisation was based on British pattern and the real fillip came during 1942 at the time of the Second World War. During 1967, a separate department for Fire Services was created and all operations were brought under it.

== Organisational structure ==
The headquarters of Tamil Nadu Fire and Rescue Services department is in Chennai.

The department is under the administrative control of the Home Department, Government of Tamil Nadu. An IPS Officer in the rank of Director General/ Additional Director General of Police is the Head of the department. The regions of Tamil Nadu are divided into 32 Divisions, each Division being controlled by a Divisional Officer. Each Division has 4 to 16 Fire and Rescue Services Stations. As of 2011, there were 299 Fire and Rescue Services Stations throughout the State, apart from 2 exclusive Rescue Stations at Hogenakkal and Kothagiri.

=== Hierarchy ===
- Director (DGP ranked IPS Officer)
- Additional Director
- Joint Director
- Deputy Director
- District Fire Officer
- Assistant District Fire Officer
- Station Officer
- Assistant Station Officer
- Leading Fireman
- Senior Fireman
- Fireman

== Women in service ==
The department was the first to appoint a woman Fire Officer in the country. In 2003, the department appointed 38-year-old Meenakshi Vijayakumar as a Divisional Fire Officer, making her the first female Fire Officer in the country. She was later awarded the President's Fire Service Medal for Gallantry in 2013 for a rescue operation in Chennai. Around the same time, Priya Ravichandran was appointed as its second woman officer. She was posted in Coimbatore and later appointed as the Divisional Officer for Chennai, thus becoming the first woman in the country to hold the post of a divisional officer. This was followed up with the selection of eight more women officers in 2009. In 2013, the department inducted its second batch of women fire-fighters.

== Training facility ==
The State Training Centre of the Tamil Nadu Fire and Rescue Services, earlier at Mint area in North Chennai, was shifted to its present location, Tambaram in the year 2000. The Tambaram facility is built on a six-acre land, which acts as a training ground for more than 2,000 personnel annually, including TNFRS freshers and fire officers, fire personnel from other states, firemen from Satish Dhawan Space Centre in Sriharikota and personnel from private firms in the city.

== See also ==
- National Disaster Management Authority (India)
