= West Bengal Fire Service =

Fire department in India

West Bengal Fire and Emergency services
Agency overview
- Established: 1950 (merger of Calcutta Fire Brigade and Bengal Fire Service)
- Employees: 7,500
- Chief Fire Officer: Shri Anuj Sharma, IPS, Director General
- Motto: Prevent fire save life and property (আগুন থামান জীবন ও সম্পত্তি বাঁচান)

Facilities and equipment
- Divisions: 18
- Stations: 165
- Engines: 550

Website
- wbfes.gov.in

The West Bengal Fire Service is the state owned service that provides firefighting, rescue and emergency medical services to the state of West Bengal, India including the city of Kolkata.

== History ==
The Fire Service in West Bengal is the oldest fire service in the country. Calcutta Fire Brigade, auxiliary fire services and Bengal Fire Service were amalgamated in 1950 to form the West Bengal Fire Services by the West Bengal Fire Service Act enacted in 1950 under the Department of Urban Development and Municipal Affairs and amended in 1996 with inclusion of fire prevention and Fire Safety Rules.In 2001 Department of Fire Services was created under a separate ministry and in 2005 the ministry was renamed as West Bengal Fire & Emergency Services.

== Organisation structure ==
- Departmental Secretariat
  - Establishment Section
  - General Section
  - Purchase Section
  - Recruitment Section
  - License Section
  - Account Section
  - Law Section
  - RTI Section
  - Fire Prevention and Safety Section
- Directorate
  - Institute of Fire Service
  - Fire Protection and Prevention office
  - Legal and Assessment Office
  - Accounts Office
  - Admin Office
  - Central Workshop
- Zonal Offices
  - North Zone
  - West Zone
  - East Zone
  - South Zone
  - HQ Zone
- Divisional Offices
  - Jalpaiguri
  - Darjeeling
  - Coochbehar
  - Malda
  - Uttar and Dakshin Dinajpur
  - Howrah
  - Hooghly
  - Purba Medinipur
  - Paschim Medinipur
  - Murshidabad
  - Birbhum
  - Bankura-Purulia
  - Burdwan
  - Kolkata North
  - Kolkata South

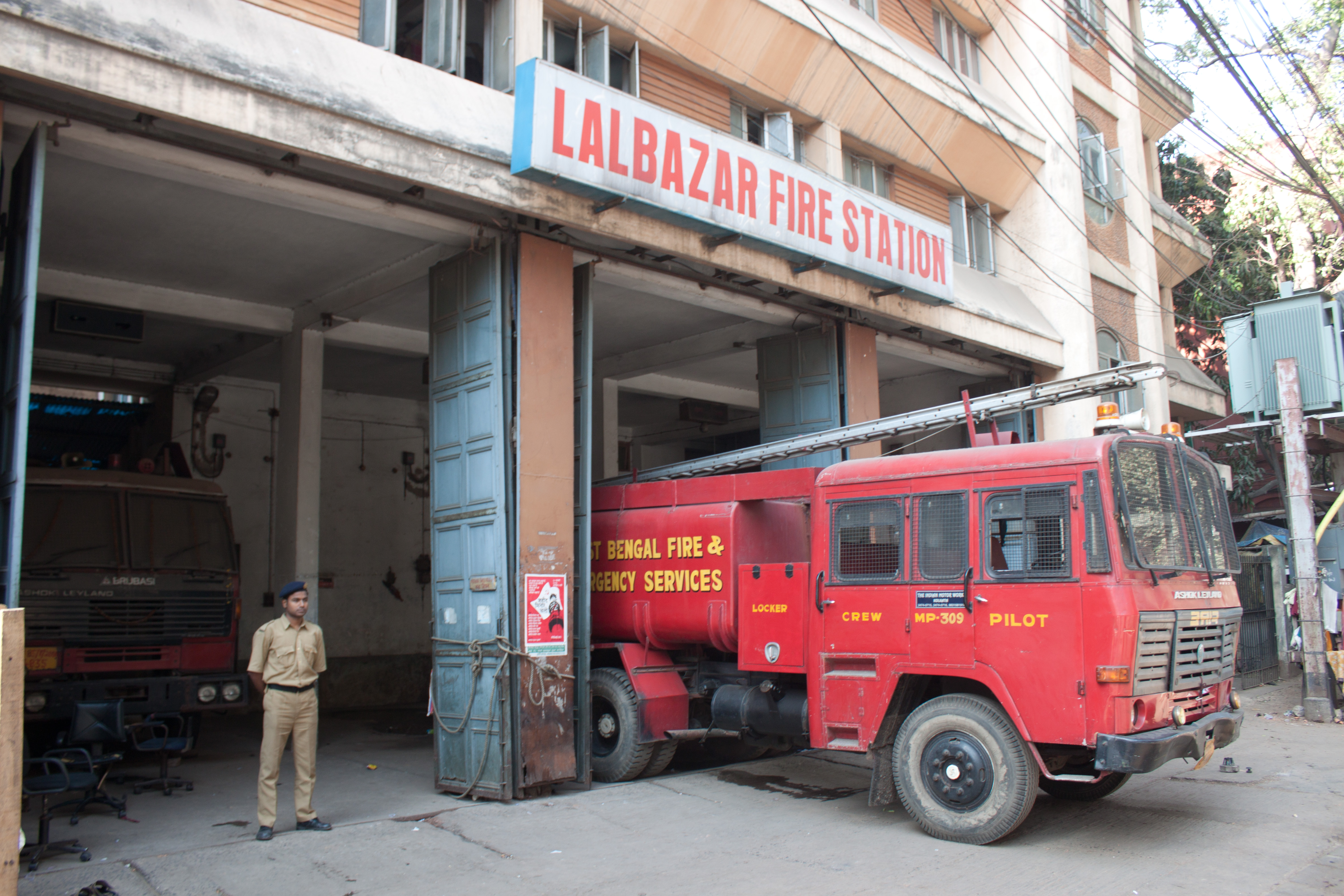
Fire station in Lalbazar, Kolkata

== Supporting Boards and Committees ==
- WBFES Welfare Board and WBFES District Welfare Board
- Technical Expert Committee
- Technical Committee
- Vishakha Committee
- Condemnation Committee

== Laws and Constitutional Provisions ==
- Rules of Business of this Government issued under Article 166(3) of the Constitution of India
- West Bengal Secretariat Manual
- West Bengal Fire Services Act, 1950 and amended acts, rules and regulations made after this act
- National Building Code
- Relevant Municipal Laws and other relevant laws in force in the State of West Bengal
- West Bengal Treasury Rules
- West Bengal Financial Rules
- West Bengal Fire Service Manual
