= Chandigarh Fire and Emergency Services =

Indian fire department

Agency overview
- EMS level: BLS
- Motto: Valour, Abnegation & Sacrifice

Facilities and equipment
- Stations: 7
- Ambulances: 3

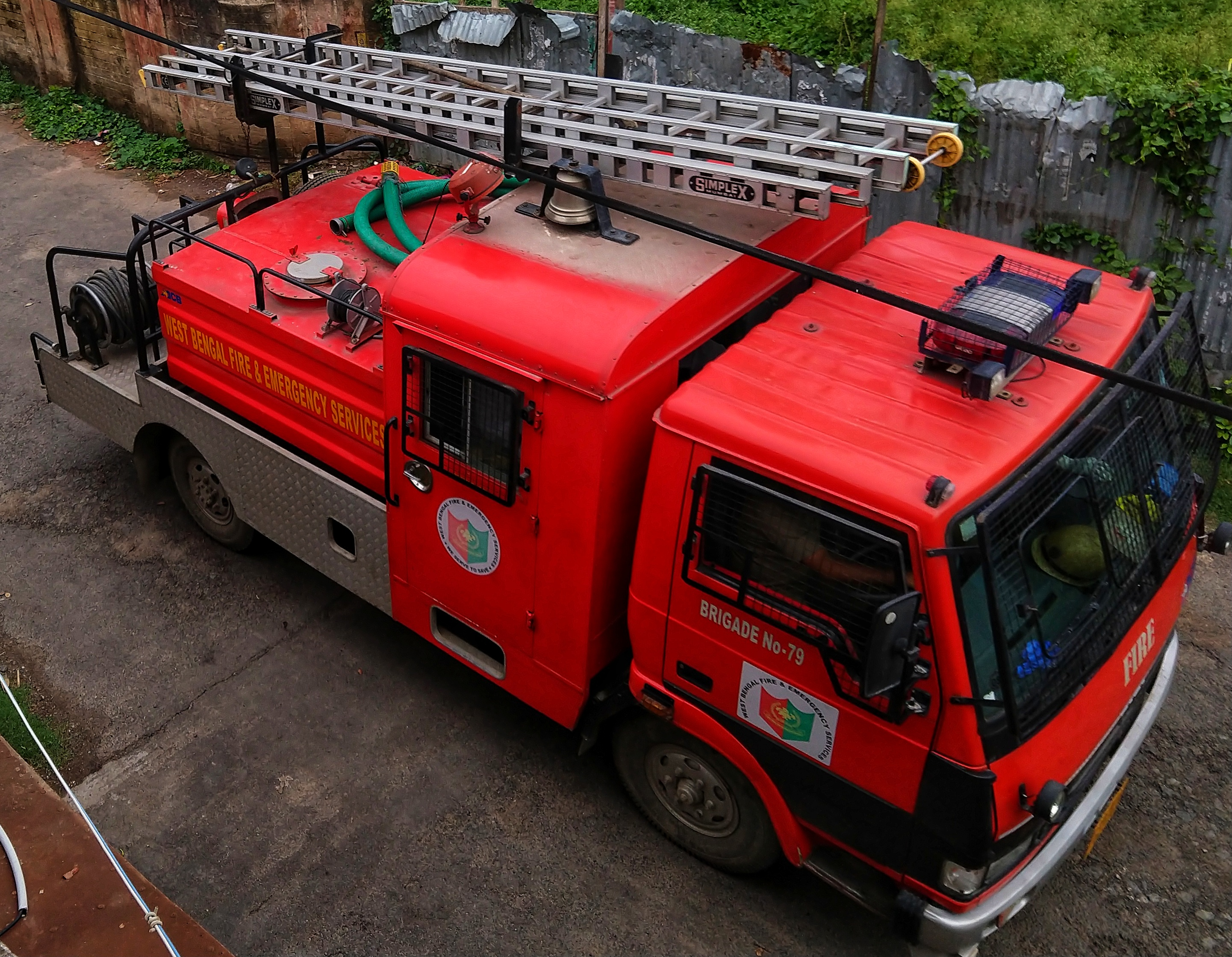

The Chandigarh Fire and Emergency Services is the fire brigade wing of the Chandigarh Municipal Corporation.

As of 2012, the department had seven fire stations across the city and plans were afoot to build six more.

In 2009, a proposal was mooted in the Chandigarh Municipal Corporation to allow women into the fire services.

The department also sets up temporary fire stations during festive seasons to ensure that no mishaps occur.
