= Directorate of Fire and Emergency Services, Goa =

Regional fire brigade of Goa, India

Goa State Fire Force
Agency overview
- Fire chief: Nitin V Raiker
- EMS level: BLS

Facilities and equipment
- Stations: 17

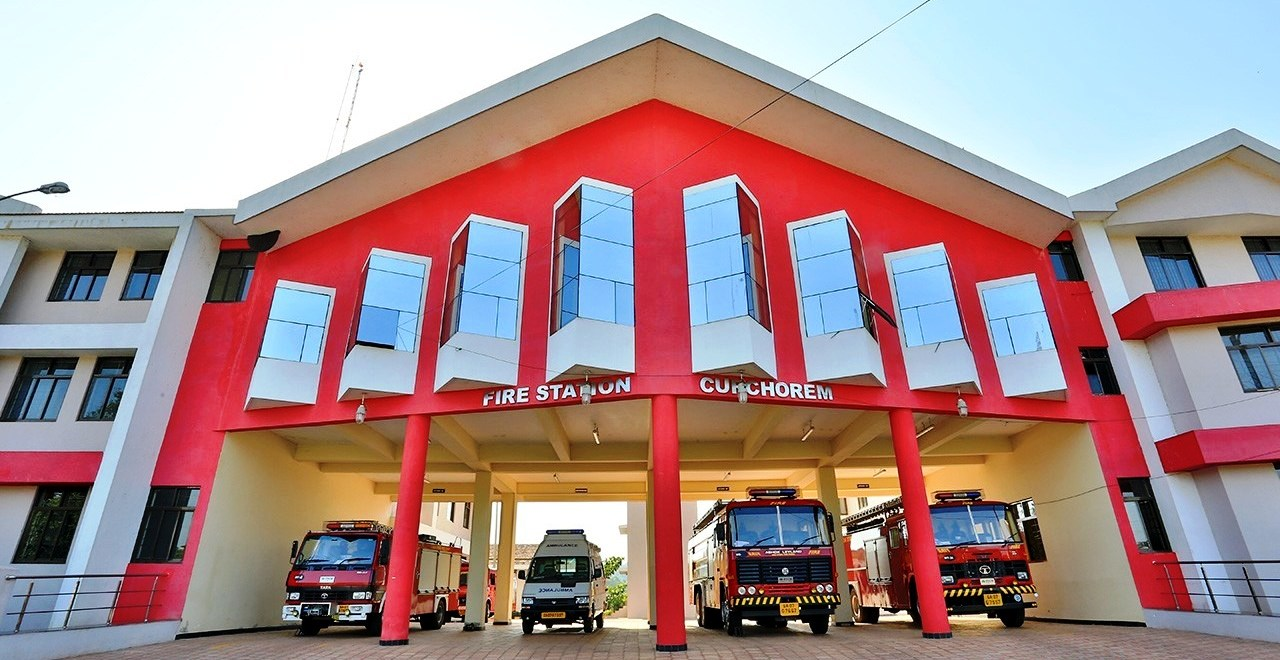
Fire station at Curchorem, 2016

The Directorate of Fire and Emergency Services, Goa is the fire brigade run by the Government of Goa. The department has 17 fire stations throughout Goa, including Bicholim, Canacona, Cuncolim, Curchorem, Kundaim, Mapusa, Margao, Old Goa, Panaji, Pernem, Pilerne, Ponda, Valpoi, Vasco da Gama, and Verna. Several fire stations such as the one in Pernem and Ponda have been stated to be ill-equipped with only two fire tenders at each station.

In 2010, a proposal was made to allow women to become firefighters, which would have made Goa the first state in western India to do so. In 2013, six Royal Enfield bikes were inducted into the fleet for fighting operations in congested areas. These bikes are equipped with fire extinguishers, wireless communication, sirens, and first aid kits.

A Goan fire fighting trainer Francisco Clemente, represents the department as an athlete. He is also representing India at the 2014 Lusophony Games in Goa in long distance running. The directorate is the sole authority to issue a No Objection Certificate for fire safety. It allows people to register for issuing as well as filing incident reports on its website.
