= Emergency Aeromedical Service =

Air ambulance service in Ireland

- Abbreviation: EAS
- Established: 2012
- Purpose: Provision of helicopter emergency medical services
- Region served: Ireland
- Parent organization: Air Corps; National Ambulance Service

The Emergency Aeromedical Service (EAS) is a helicopter-based medical evacuation and air ambulance service based in Athlone, Ireland. Operated since 2012 by the Air Corps and National Ambulance Service under the call sign MEDEVAC 112, the service was redesignated AIR CORPS 112 in 2016. It is a joint project of the Irish government Departments of Defence and Health, and provides an advanced-paramedic response to patients whose location or clinical condition requires aeromedical support.

The service was launched on an initial 12-month trial basis on 4 June 2012, operating initially on a Eurocopter EC135 aircraft and later on an AgustaWestland AW139, based at Custume Barracks in Athlone, Westmeath. It continued to operate beyond the initial trial period, and was made permanent in June 2015. As of 2022, the unit had reportedly "completed over 3500 missions".
