= Irish Air Corps =

Air service of the Irish Defence Forces

Air Corps
- An tAerchór
- Badge of the Air Corps
- Founded: July 1922
- Country: Ireland
- Type: Army aviation
- Size: 689 active personnel (Establishment: 866) (December 2023); 24 aircraft (+3 aircraft in support of the Garda Síochána)
- Part of: Irish Defence Forces
- Headquarters: Casement Aerodrome, Baldonnel
- Mottos: Irish: Forḟaire agus Tairiseaċt "Watchful and Loyal"
- Website: Air Corps – Defence Forces

Commanders
- General Officer Commanding: Brigadier General Rory O'Connor

Insignia
- Roundel

- Fin flash

- Colours

Aircraft flown
- Helicopter: AW139, EC 135P2/T2
- Trainer helicopter: EC 135P2/T2
- Patrol: Airbus C295
- Reconnaissance: Pilatus PC-12
- Trainer: PC-9M
- Transport: Airbus C295, Dassault Falcon 6X, Pilatus PC-12

The Air Corps (Irish: An tAerchór) is the aviation arm of the Irish Defence Forces. Established in 1922, the Air Corps operates fixed-wing aircraft and rotorcraft to provide support to the Irish Army, Irish Naval Service and Garda Síochána, rather than actually controlling Irish airspace, having retired its last combat jet aircraft in 1999. Its headquarters is located at its sole air base at Casement Aerodrome, Baldonnel, County Dublin. The Air Corps has an active establishment of 886 personnel. Like other components of the Defence Forces, it has struggled to maintain strength and, as of December 2023, had only 689 active personnel.

== History ==
=== National Army Air Service ===
Former roundel of the Irish Air Corps

The origins of the Air Corps go back to the Anglo-Irish Treaty talks of 1921, a Martinsyde Type A Mark II biplane was purchased and put on 24-hour standby at Croydon Airport to allow Michael Collins to escape back to Ireland if the talks failed. The plane was not needed for this mission, and it became the first aircraft of the new National Army Air Service arriving in June 1922.

The National Army Air Service was established in July 1922 and was gradually equipped with various aircraft types acquired from the Royal Air Force (RAF) and the Aircraft Disposal Company. This company was formed in 1919 to dispose of surplus aircraft and aero-engines from World War I for the British government. By the end of 1922, the National Army Air Service comprised ten aircraft, consisting of six Bristol F2B fighters from the First World War and four Martinsyde F4 Fighters, and about 400 men.

As the National Army Air Services capabilities were modest, and the Anti-Treaty IRA forces had no air force for it to engage in any event, the Air Service played a minimal role in the Irish Civil War.

=== The Air Corps ===
==== Early years ====
National Army Air Service was renamed the Irish Army Air Corps (IAAC) as the Irish Free State reorganised its Defence Forces as part of Defence Forces Act 1924. Army's Air Corps remained part of the Army until the 1990s.

In 1938, four Gloster Gladiator biplane fighters were delivered – a further eight were ordered but were embargoed by the outbreak of World War II. Other aircraft purchased from the United Kingdom before the outbreak of war included 16 Avro Anson Mark I maritime patrol bombers, 3 Supermarine Walrus amphibians, 6 Westland Lysander Mark II army co-operation aircraft and a number of trainers.

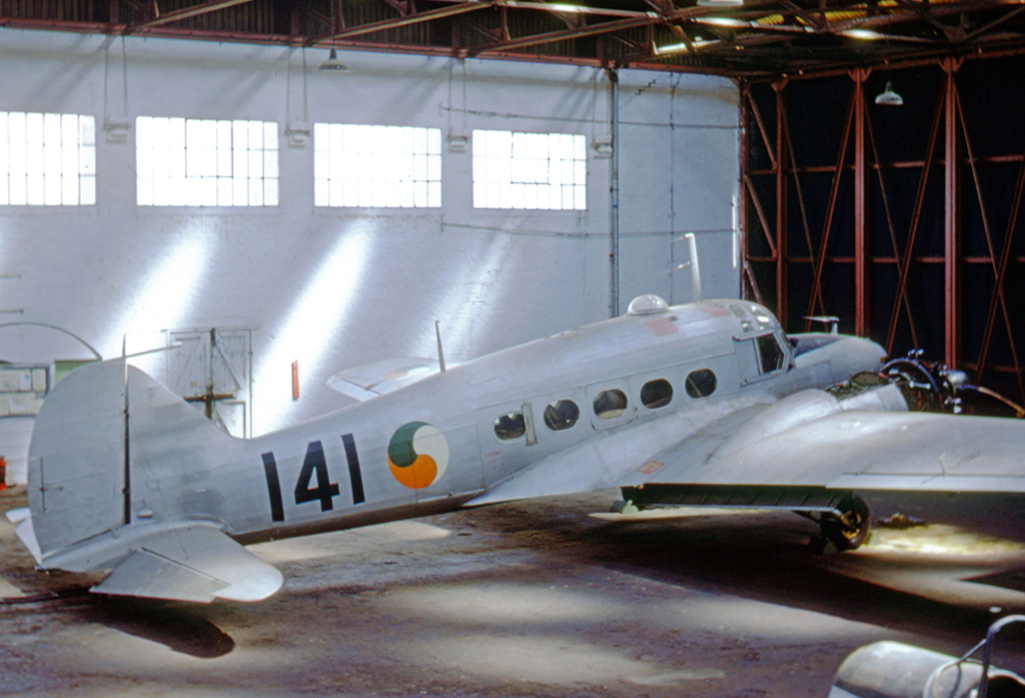
Irish Air Corps Avro Anson C.19, operated from 1946 to 1962

de Havilland Vampire T-11 trainers of the Irish Air Corps in 1955

==== World War II (The Emergency) ====
During World War II (or The Emergency) there are no records of Air Corps planes engaging any belligerent aircraft, although dozens of escaped barrage balloons were shot down. Requests for more aircraft from Britain resulted in 13 obsolete Hawker Hector biplane light bombers being supplied during 1941. Twelve Hawker Hurricane Mk. Is were initially ordered for the Irish Army Air Corps in 1940 but were not delivered due to a wartime embargo imposed by the British government. Eleven Hurricane Mk. Is were eventually delivered to the Air Corps, from surplus RAF stocks, between July 1943 and March 1944, and the Hurricane Mk. I (no.93), that crash-landed in County Wexford in 1940, was the twelfth aircraft. These were supplemented by 6 Hawker Hurricane Mk. IIcs that were delivered to the Irish Army Air Corps in March 1945, to eventually replace the Hurricane Mk. Is of No. 1 Fighter Squadron. Supplied from surplus RAF stocks, the Hurricane Mk. IIcs were the last batch of aircraft to be delivered to the Air Corps before the end of World War II. The Hurricanes were the first monoplane fighter aircraft to enter service with the Air Corps and were also the first aircraft capable of reaching 300 m.p.h. in level flight. The Hurricane gave the Air Corps a proven modern fighter, and – at peak – 20 flew in Irish colours. 163 belligerent aircraft force-landed in Ireland during the war, and in this way, the Air Corps acquired a Lockheed Hudson, a Fairey Battle, and three Hawker Hurricanes.

==== The Cold War ====
After the Emergency, the Hurricanes were replaced by Supermarine Seafires and a few two-seat Spitfire trainers.
The jet age arrived on 30 July 1956 when the Corps took delivery of three de Havilland Vampire T.55 trainers, followed by three more in 1960 who served as advanced trainers and fighters.
The Vampires were replaced by six secondhand Fouga CM.170 Magister jet trainers which arrived in 1975-76. The Magisters were used for jet training, by the Light Strike Squadron with machineguns and rockets, for aerobatics by the Silver Swallows display team, and VIP escort.

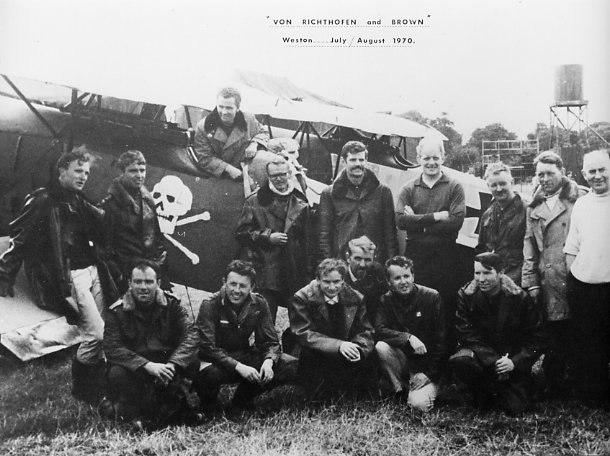
Irish Air Corps pilots filming Roger Corman's Richthofen & Brown, 1970. Lynn Garrison second from right, front row.

De Havilland Chipmunk T.20s were introduced in the 1950s and used as basic flight trainers until 1976. Hunting Percival Provost T.51 and T.53s were also introduced in the 1950s as advanced flight trainers, serving until 1976.

During the mid-sixties and early seventies, the Corps played a part in expanding Ireland's film industry. Pilots and engineering staff participated in a 1965 box office success, The Blue Max. The fleet of World War I replicas, owned by ex-RCAF fighter pilot Lynn Garrison's "Blue Max Aviation", was based at Casement Aerodrome in Baldonnel – before being moved to Weston Aerodrome at Leixlip. Here the Corps continued its involvement, providing aircrew and engineering staff to support films such as Darling Lili, Von Richthofen and Brown, Zeppelin and a number of television commercials. Lynn Garrison was also responsible for coordinating the first demonstration of the Marchetti SF-260 Warrior at Baldonnel. As a result of this presentation, in 1977 the Corps acquired ten SIAI-Marchetti SF.260W Warriors for basic and advanced training and light ground attack. Four were lost in accidents, and one attrition replacement was acquired in 1979.

Three Avro Anson C.19s were delivered in 1946 for radio and navigation training, air-to-ground photography, and transport, and were replaced by four de Havilland Doves which arrived in 1953, 1959, 1962, and 1970, which were also used for calibration of radar and landing aids at Dublin and Shannon airports.

The Troubles in Northern Ireland required additional reconnaissance resources, and in 1972 eight Reims-Cessna FR.172H joined the Air Corps to provide patrolling, aerial surveillance, and aerial communications. One Reims-Cessna FR.172K was delivered in 1981 as an attrition replacement. The Cessnas served with No 2 Support Wing, operating from Gormanstown until the airfield's closure in 2002.

Ireland's accession to the European Economic Community in 1973 which necessitated frequent travel to European capitals for government ministers led to the creation of the Ministerial Air Transport Service (MATS) and the acquisition of the Corps' first business jet, a BAe 125-700 (#238), which served until 1992. This was joined in 1980 by a Beechcraft Super King Air 200 (#240), which also provided multi-engine training.

Ireland's accession to the EEC also necessitated sustained maritime patrolling of 342,000 km^{2} (132,000 square miles) of ocean. Two Beechcraft Super King Air 200s (#232 and #234) were delivered in 1977–78 to perform this duty.

The bad winter of 1962/3 incentivised the acquisition of helicopters and in November 1963, the Air Corps took delivery of its first three helicopters, SA.316B Alouette IIIs, followed by five more in 1972–73. The Alouettes performed search and rescue, troop transport and air ambulance duties. Two Aérospatiale SA342L Gazelle entered service in 1979 to provide helicopter training.

The single engine of the Alouette limited its search and rescue range over water, and in 1986 five twin-engined Aérospatiale SA365Fi Dauphin II were acquired for the SAR role. Two of these were modified for operation from the Naval Service Helicopter Patrol vessel LÉ Eithne, and equipped with crashproof fuel tanks and harpoon deck arrester gear.

==== After the Cold War and into the 21st century ====
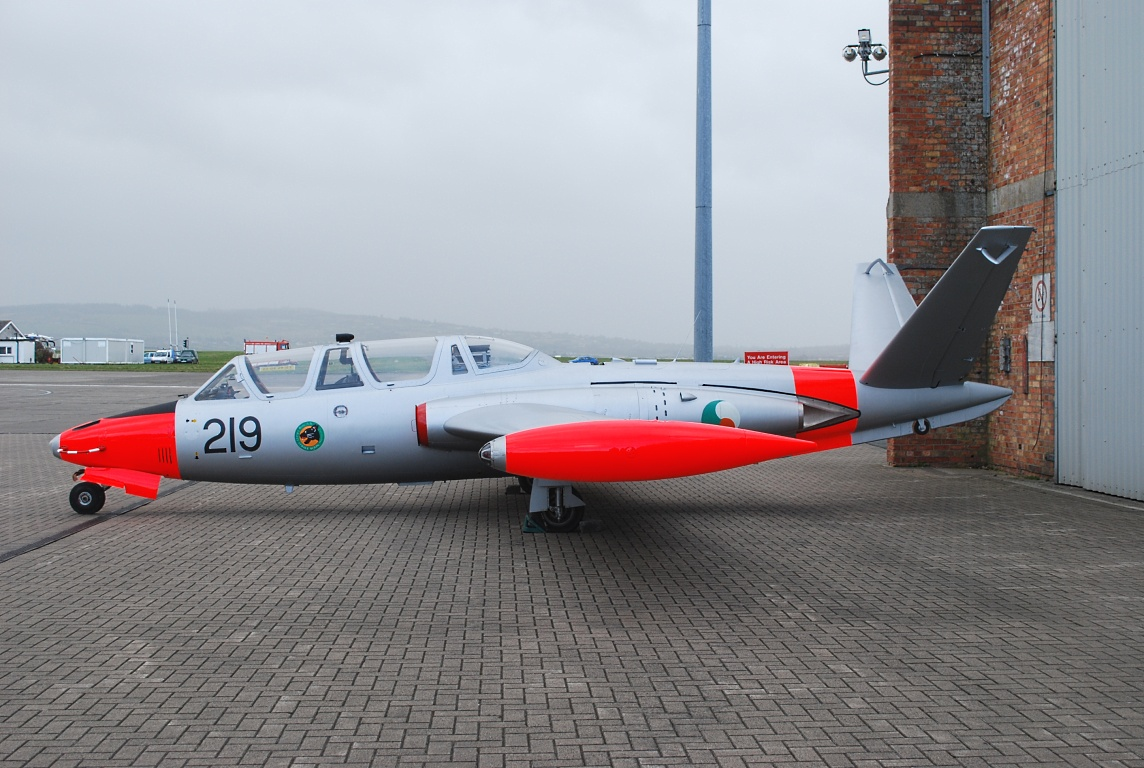
Irish Air Corps retired Fouga CM.170 Magister, operated from 1975 to 1999

In the 1990s the Irish Army Air Corps was renamed the Irish Air Corps (IAC) and was separated from the Army.

By 1999, the Magisters were all withdrawn from service, leaving Ireland without any jet combat aircraft. In 1998, a review of the Air Corps conducted by Price Waterhouse for the Irish government recommended replacing the Fougas and Marchettis by eight light strike/trainer aircraft. In 2004, the Marchettis were retired from service, and they and the Magisters were replaced by eight Pilatus PC-9M trainers. The PC-9M is the first Air Corps aircraft to have ejection seats since the Vampire, and can be lightly armed with machine guns and rocket pods for close air support. On 12 October 2009, Air Corps instructor Captain Derek Furniss and Cadet David Jevens were killed when their PC-9M (#265) crashed during a training exercise in Connemara, County Galway. In 2017, an attrition replacement (#269) was delivered.

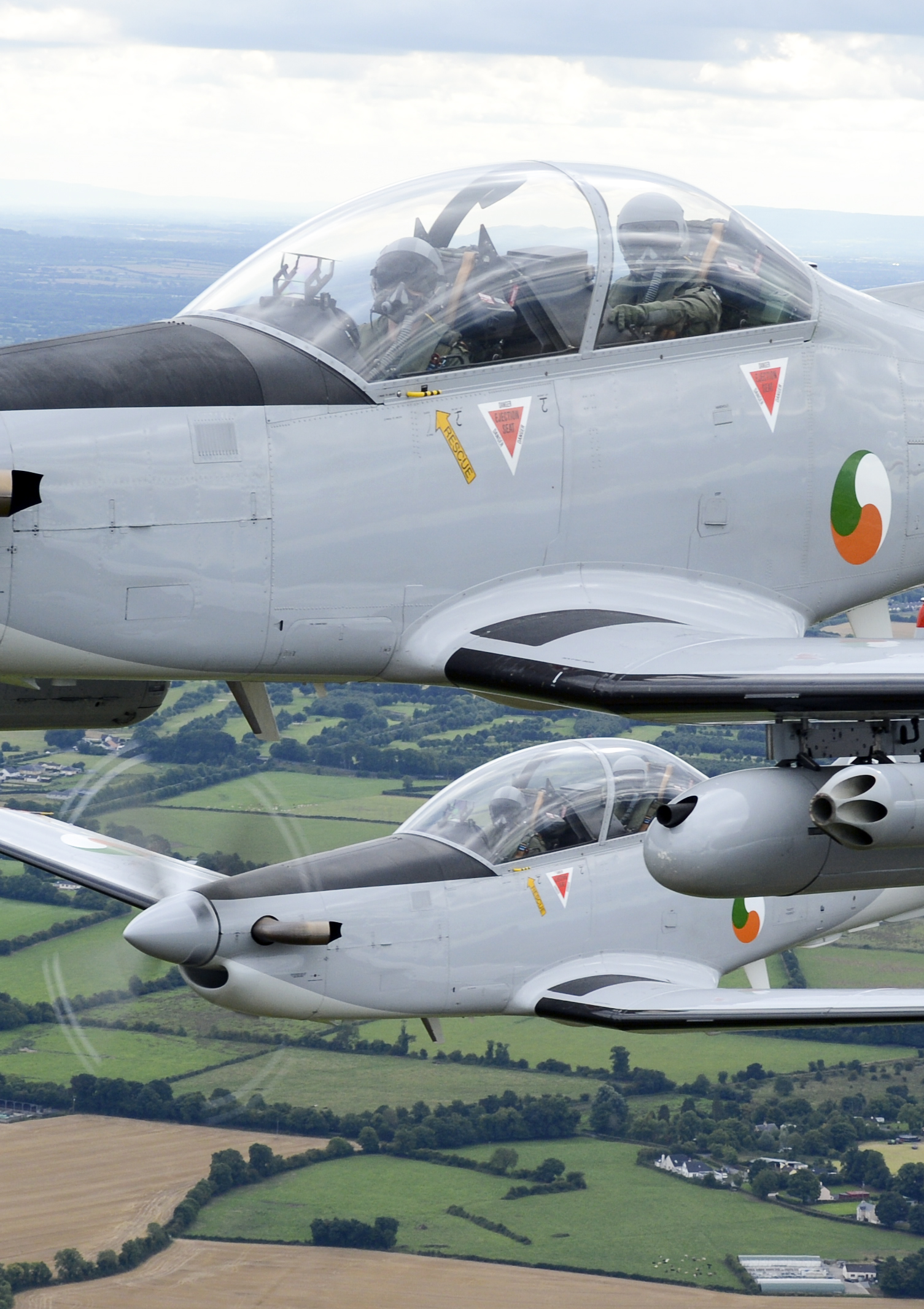
Pilatus PC-9M trainers in formation. The closer aircraft is carrying underwing machine gun and rocket pods which are used in the ground attack role.

To support Ireland's assumption of the EU Presidency in 1990, the Corps leased a Grumman Gulfstream III (#249) – which in 1990 became the first Irish military aircraft to circumnavigate the world. The success of Gulfstream III as an ambassador for Ireland led to its replacement in 1992 by a Grumman Gulfstream IV (#251) which also replaced the HS.125.

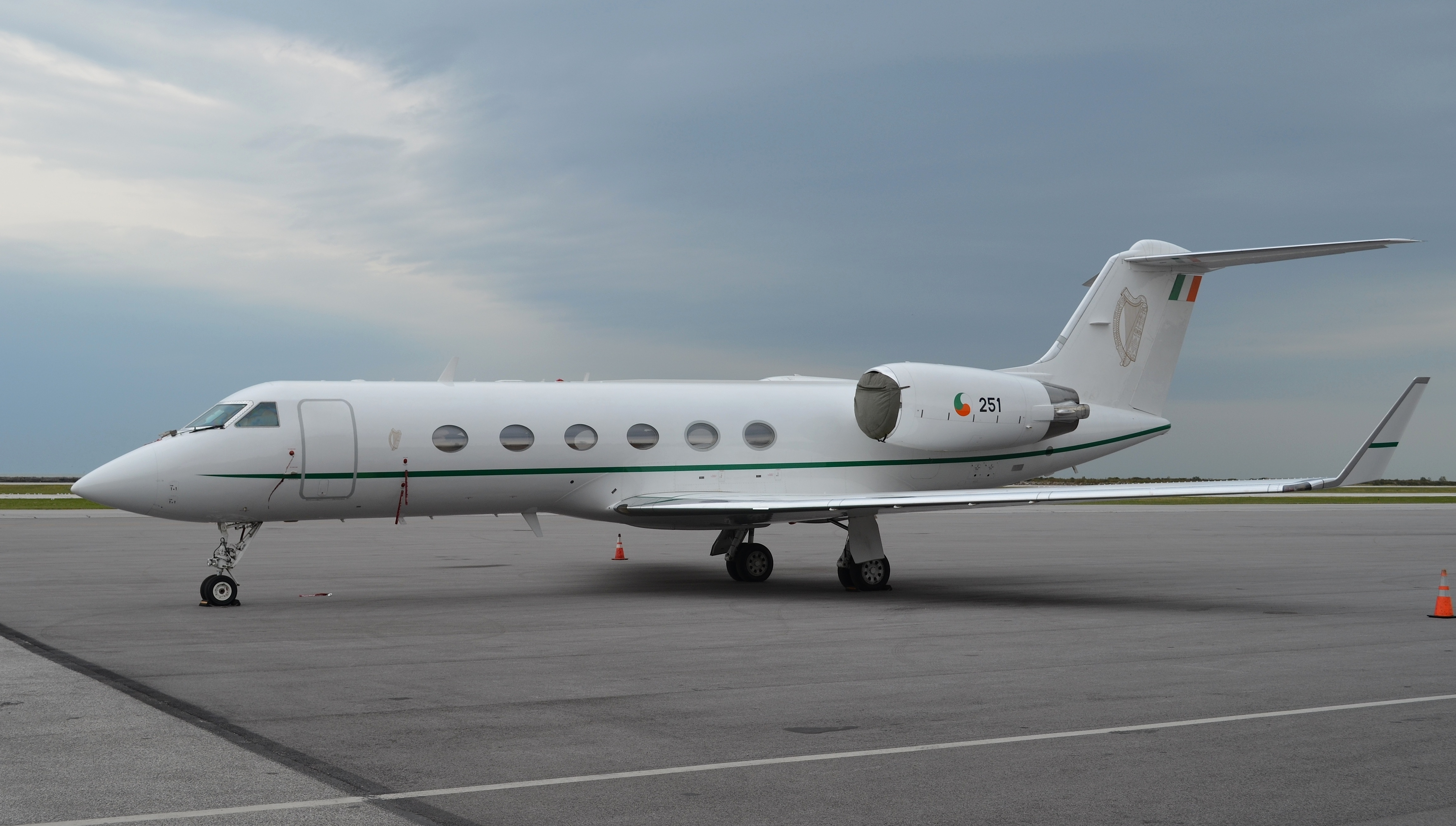
Irish Air Corps retired Gulfstream IV, which was used as VIP transport

Ireland again assumed the EU Presidency in 1994, and the Air Corps acquired a Learjet 45XR (#258) to supplement the government's ministerial travel requirements. The Ministerial Air Transport Service has since declined in use and size as government ministers are reluctant to travel in perceived luxury when adequate commercial air travel is available, and after repeated criticisms of government ministers using Air Corps aircraft for domestic travel. The repeated technical problems to the MATS aircraft has led to their gradual withdrawal from service, with the Beechcraft the first to be retired in 2009. The Gulfstream IV followed in 2014 after corrosion was detected in the undercarriage which required substantial costs to repair. In February 2023, the government agreed to replace the increasingly unreliable Learjet 45 with a mid-sized, long-range jet capable of assisting in overseas evacuation of Irish citizens, medical transport as well as ministerial air transport. In December 2024, the government ordered a Dassault Falcon 6X, for use ahead of Ireland's EU Presidency in the second half of 2026. The Falcon (#290) arrived in December 2025.

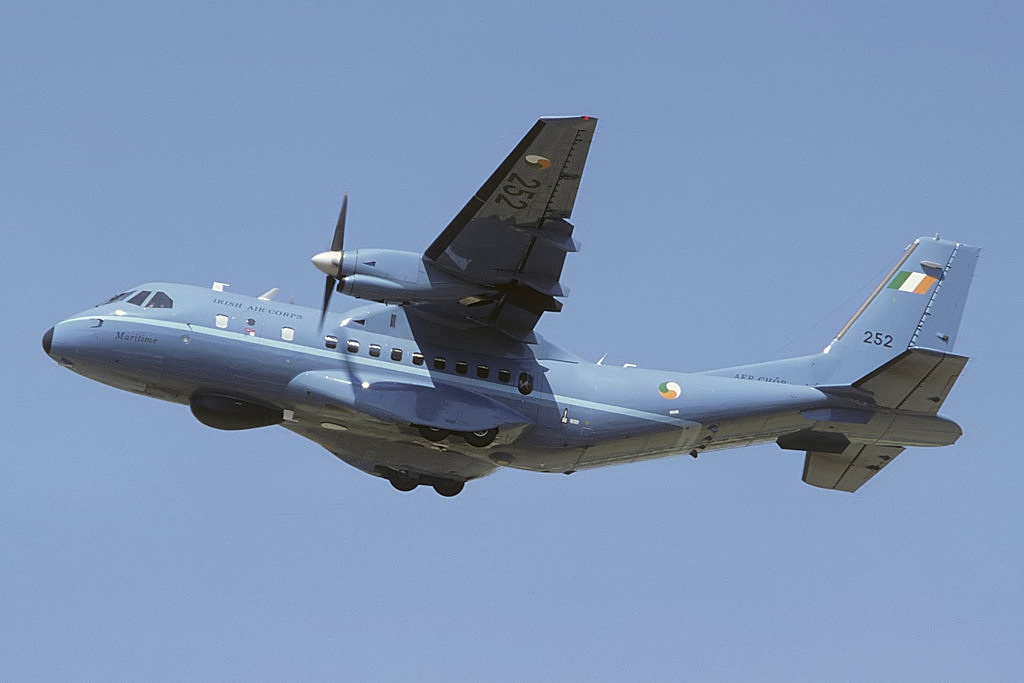
Irish Air Corps CASA CN-235, retired in 2024

The two maritime patrol Beechcraft were unsuitable for flying in long periods in a salty atmosphere and were replaced by two CASA CN235-100MP Persuader which arrived in 1994. These were upgraded in 2006/2007 by EADS CASA to the FITS Persuader standard with enhanced radar, forward looking infrared equipment and a new electronic and avionics suite. In 2019, the government ordered two Airbus C295 maritime patrol aircraft (#284, #285) which arrived in 2023 to replace the CN235.

In the 1990s the Air Corps gained a new role with the formation of the Garda Air Support Unit (GASU) in 1997. The unit was initially equipped with one Britten-Norman Defender 4000 (#254), and one Eurocopter AS.355N Ecureil (#255). Operational control of the aircraft remains with the Department of Justice, Equality, and Law Reform, while the Air Corps provide pilots and technicians to fly and maintain the aircraft. The AS.355N was supplemented by a Eurocopter EC135 T2 (#256) in 2003, and replaced by a second EC135 T2 (#272) which arrived in January 2008. In December 2025, the Britten-Norman was replaced by a DHC-6 Twin Otter (#288).

During the 1990s and 2000s, the Air Corps gradually lost its search and rescue (SAR) role. In 1990, an inquiry chaired by retired Garda Commissioner Eamonn Doherty into Ireland's air sea rescue recommended transferring this service from the Air Corps to a new emergency service, and the stationing of rescue helicopters at regional airports instead of a centralised service. The government accepted the recommendations and established the Irish Marine Emergency Service (IMES), now the Irish Coast Guard in 1991. Irish Helicopters operated the first privatised SAR helicopter, a Sikorsky S-61N, from Shannon in 1991. This service was later taken over by Bond Helicopters (now CHC Helicopter) in 1997 who also won the Dublin contract in 1999.

On 2 July 1999, Captains Dave O'Flaherty and Mick Baker, Sergeant Pat Mooney and Corporal Niall Byrne were killed when their Dauphin (#248) crashed into sand dunes at Tramore Beach, County Waterford. The crash only emphasised the limits of the Air Corps SAR helicopters, as the Alouette was only available during daylight hours and the Dauphin was small and had a short range. Both needed replacement by medium-sized helicopters.

In 2002, CHC took over the Waterford SAR contract, leaving the Air Corps with only the north-east contract. While a S-61 was leased to train crews, pending a tender to purchase up to five medium helicopters, two of which would be SAR helicopters, the contract was cancelled and CHC took over the north-east contract based in Sligo, leaving the Air Corps without a SAR role.

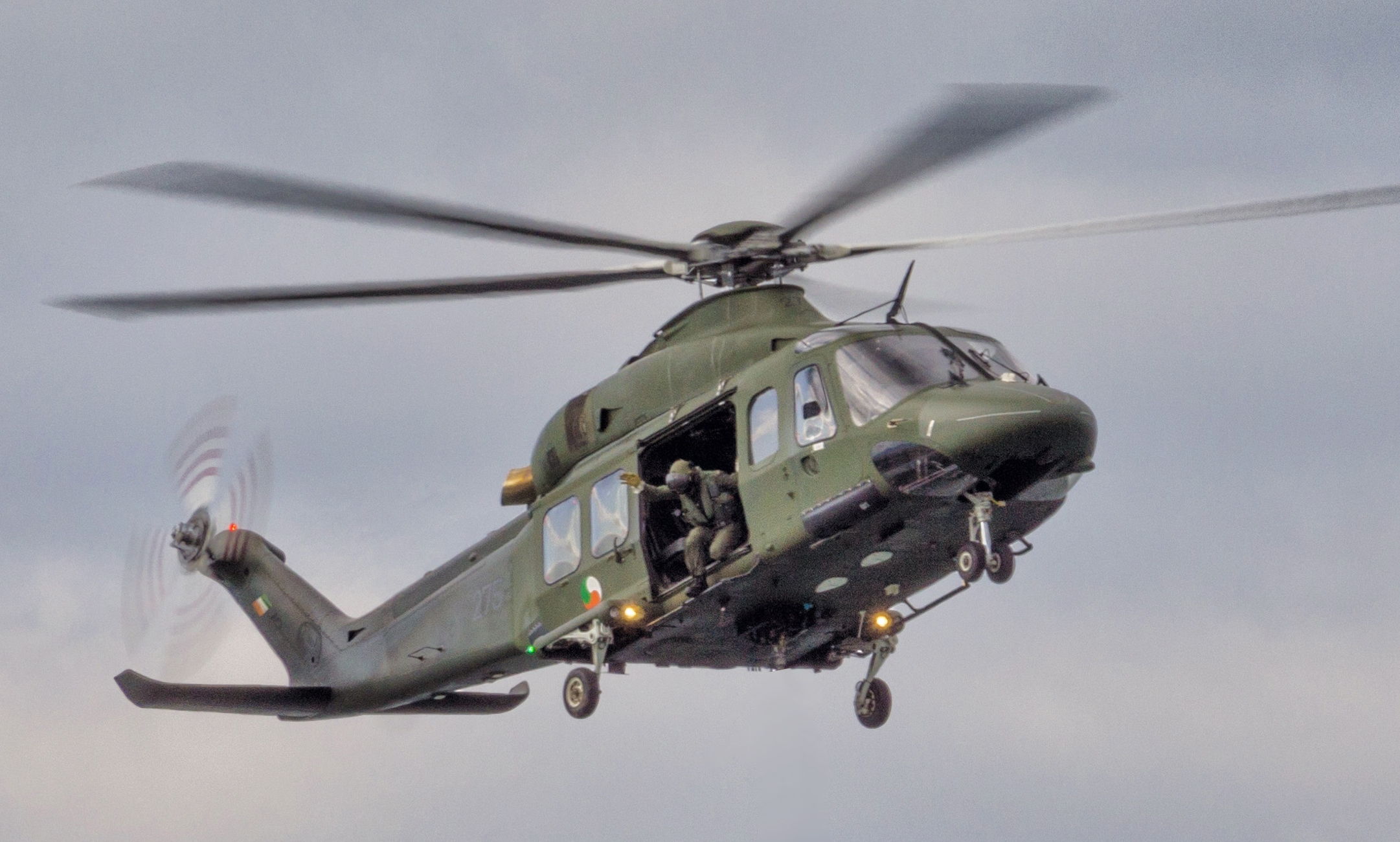
Irish Air Corps AgustaWestland AW139

Despite the cancellation of the order for five S-92s and the loss of the SAR role, the aging Alouettes, Gazelles and Dauphins still needed replacement. In 2004 the government ordered two Eurocopter EC135P2 light helicopters for training, air ambulance, and general utility, and four AgustaWestland AW139 medium helicopters for troop transport, air ambulance, and VIP transport. The Gazelles were retired in 2005 and replaced in November by two EC135 P2. The Dauphins were retired in 2006, followed by the Alouettes in 2007. During their operational lifetime, 3,300 people were assisted by the Alouette helicopters in their Search and Rescue and air ambulance roles. The four AW139 arrived during 2006/7, and the option for an additional two was exercised and arrived in 2008. Since 2012, one of the AW139 has operated an air ambulance service from Custume Barracks, Athlone for the Emergency Aeromedical Service.

On 4 October 2019, after 47 years of service to the state, the five remaining Reims/Cessna FR172H Rocket aircraft were retired from service after amassing 63,578 flight hours total. The Cessnas were replaced with several Pilatus PC-12NG aircraft during 2020. The first PC-12NG utility transport variant was delivered in April 2020, followed by three PC-12NG 'Spectre' aerial surveillance variants in September 2020.

During the 2011 Libyan civil war, the Air Corps was tasked with evacuating approximately forty Irish citizens from the troubled country. The operation involved two Air Corps aircraft (the Learjet and one CN-235), and nine personnel, using Malta as a temporary base.

There was much criticism of Ireland's inability to rescue its own citizens in the 2021 Kabul and 2023 Sudan evacuations due to Ireland's lack of a long-range, heavy-lift aircraft. In August 2021, Ireland had to ask France and Finland to rescue 36 Irish citizens from Kabul. In April 2023, over 90 Irish citizens were evacuated from Sudan by aircraft from France, Spain and the UK. In December 2022, an order was placed for an additional Airbus C295 (#286), to be used for cargo and personnel transport, including overseas operations, special operations forces support and medical evacuations. The aircraft arrived in October 2025.

In 2024, the state settled a case with a former Air Corps technician, who had worked in the avionics section in the 1990s, and who was "allegedly exposed to toxic chemicals which he says caused severe health difficulties".

Like other components of the Irish Defence Forces, the Air Corps has struggled to maintain strength and compete with private sector salaries. In May 2025, it was reported that a shortage of air traffic controllers meant that the Air Corps would be limited to 12-hour operations from Monday-Friday.

Without combat jet aircraft of its own, in 1952 Ireland secretly agreed an arrangement with the UK to allow the Royal Air Force to respond to incursions into Irish airspace, mostly recently against Russian bombers during the 2020s.

== Future ==
In December 2020, the government established a Commission on the Defence Forces (CoDF), which published its report in February 2022. For the Air Corps, the report recommended changing the Air Corps from a sub branch of the army to a stand alone service renamed the Air Force with its own Chief. The report also recommended the establishment of an Air Corps Reserve of pilots, air traffic controllers, and specialist technicians. For Air Corps equipment, the report recommended three limits of ambition (LOAs), each with different levels of capability. LOA 1 proposed keeping the Air Corps as is, whilst LOA 2 recommended a budget of €1.5 billion with LOA 3 recommending a budget of €2.967 billion. The commission compared Ireland to other nations of similar GDP and population size, and determined these budgetary increases would be commensurate with those nations. In 2023, the government committed to implementing LOA 2 by 2028, and published a Detailed Implementation Plan for the Report of the Commission of the Defence Forces (DIP-CoDF) with a status for each of the recommendations.

Ireland lacks primary radar to detect aircraft in its airspace who have switched off their transponders, like hijacked aircraft, incursions by Russian military aircraft, and drones. The 2015 White Paper on Defence stated that, if additional funding became available, the acquisition of a radar surveillance capability for the Air Corps would be a priority. The 2019 White Paper on Defence Update reported that no additional funding had been provided. The 2022 CoDF report recommended acquiring primary radar under LOA 2, which the 2023 DIP-CoDF report planned to be completed by 2028. The government approached several governments about acquiring radar, and in December 2025 agreed to procure a platform with France.

The CoDF report under LOA 2 recommended acquiring two additional medium helicopters, and eventually replacing the medium helicopter fleet with eight super-medium helicopters.

The CoDF also recommended under LOA2 acquiring strategic airlift aircraft to support Defence Forces in Africa and Middle East and provide ministerial transport. In 2025, both a C295 transport aircraft and a Falcon 6X executive jet were delivered to the Air Corps.

Without combat jet aircraft since the beginning of the 21st century, and as the PC-9s have very limited combat capability, the 2015 White Paper on Defence stated the White Paper update would consider a more capable air combat/intercept capability than the PC-9s. The 2019 Update to the White Paper on Defence reported that the project had not commenced. The 2022 CoDF report recommended acquiring a squadron of jet combat aircraft under LOA 3, which the 2023 DIP-CoDF report stated would be reviewed by the government in 2028. Although the Pilatus PC-9s are due to reach their 20-year service life in 2025, as of 2023 no tender for a replacement aircraft had been announced.

== Organisation ==
The Irish Air Corps is the air branch of the Irish Defence Forces. Headed up by Brigadier General Rory O'Connor, General Officer Commanding Air Corps (GOCAC), the Air Corps comprises a staff headquarters, two air wings, two ground support wings, one independent squadron and the Air Corps College.

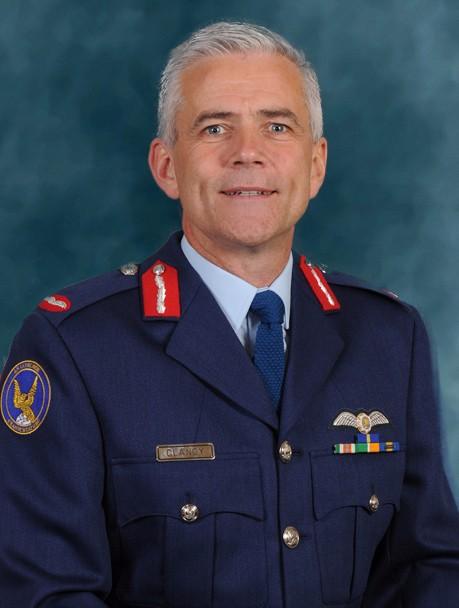
Brigadier General Seán Clancy was General Officer Commanding of the Air Corps from 2017 to 2019.

=== Air Corps Headquarters ===
- Office of General Officer Commanding
- Operations Section
- Support Section
- Military Airworthiness Authority
- Flight Safety Section
- Military Police Section

=== No 1 Operations Wing ===
1 Operations Wing is the main formation responsible for operational fixed-wing flying. This is sub-divided into four individual flying squadrons and two non-flying squadrons, each of which has a dedicated role:

- 101 Squadron – Maritime Surveillance and Airlift
- 102 Squadron – Ministerial Transport
- 103 Squadron – Engineering
- 104 Squadron – Army Co-op
- 105 Squadron – Defence Forces Photographic Section

=== No 3 Operations Wing ===
3 Operations Wing is the formation responsible for operational rotary wing flying, and is divided into three flying squadrons and one non-flying squadron. It provides pilots for the Emergency Aeromedical Service, the air ambulance service which is jointly operated by the Air Corps and the HSE National Ambulance Service.

- 301 Tactical Helicopter Squadron
- 302 Training and Surveillance Squadron
- 303 Maintenance and Deployment Squadron
- 304 Garda Air Support Squadron

=== No 4 Support Wing ===
4 Support Wing is primarily concerned with second-line aircraft maintenance (front line maintenance is done by the engineering squadrons in each operational wing). This formation has two squadrons.

- 401 Squadron – Mechanical support
- 402 Squadron – Avionics support

=== No 5 Support Wing ===
5 Support Wing is responsible for logistic support for the Air Corps.

- 502 Squadron – Logistic support
- 503 Squadron – Transport
- 504 Squadron – Medical services
- 505 Squadron – Air Traffic Control
- 506 Squadron – Fire Fighting

=== Communication & Information Services Squadron ===
Communication & Information Services Squadron (CIS) is responsible for the supply and maintenance of ground-based communications, navigation, radar and IT systems for the Air Corps. The CIS Squadron comprises a headquarters and four flights.

- Squadron HQ
- Airfield Services Flight
- Communications Flight
- Technical Services Flight
- Information Technology Flight

=== Air Corps College ===
The Air Corps College is the principal training unit of the Irish Air Corps, where all entrants into the service undertake their training. The college is divided into three distinct schools:

- Flying Training School (FTS) – The FTS has primary responsibility both for flying training, for which it is equipped with a squadron of Pilatus PC-9 fixed-wing aircraft, as well as officer training.
- Technical Training School (TTS) – The TTS undertakes technical training for those who will become aircraft technicians.
- Military Training and Survival School (MTSS) – The MTSS is responsible for the basic military training of all new recruits, as well as career progression training.

=== Air bases ===
The Air Corps' principal base of operations is Casement Aerodrome in Dublin.

== Equipment ==
=== Current aircraft ===
Aircraft	Origin	Role	Variant	In service	Serial Nos	Entered service	Notes and references
Maritime surveillance
Airbus C295	Spain	Maritime patrol	C295W MSA	2	284-285	2023	
Reconnaissance
Pilatus PC-12	Switzerland	ISTAR	PC-12NG "Spectre"	3	281-283	2020	
Transport
Pilatus PC-12	Switzerland	Utility	PC-12NG	1	280	2020	
Airbus C295	Spain	Transport	C295W	1	286	2025	
Dassault Falcon 6X	France	Executive transport		1	290	2025	
Helicopter
Eurocopter EC135	Germany	Utility/Trainer	EC135 P2	2	270-271	2005	To be replaced by Airbus H145M, four of which were order in 2024 for expected delivery from 2027.
AgustaWestland AW139	Italy	Utility		6	274-279	2006	Can be armed.
Trainer
Pilatus PC-9	Switzerland	Trainer / CAS	PC-9M	8	260-267, 269	2004	Serial Nos #268 and #269 were reserved for PC-9s which were not ordered. #269 arrived, in 2017, as an attrition replacement for #265 (#265 crashed in 2009). Can be armed.
Police air support
Flown for the Garda Air Support Unit (GASU).
DHC-6 Twin Otter	Canada	Police air support	Guardian 400	1	288	2025	
Eurocopter EC135	Germany	Police air support	EC135 T2	2	256, 272	2003	To be replaced by Airbus H145, two of which were ordered in 2023 for expected delivery during 2026.

=== Weapons ===
Name	Origin	Type	Variant	Image	Notes
Small arms
Heckler & Koch USP	Germany	Semi-automatic pistol			Standard service pistol
Steyr AUG	Austria	Assault rifle	AUG A1		Standard service rifle since 1989
Machine guns & Rockets
FN MAG	Belgium	General-purpose machine gun	FN MAG 58M		Can be mounted on the AgustaWestland AW139 helicopter
M2 Browning	United States	Heavy machine gun	M3P gun pod		Used for close air support by the Pilatus PC-9M
Rocket pods	Belgium	Unguided rockets	LAU 7		Used for close air support by the Pilatus PC-9M

Of the current Irish Air Corps aircraft, only the Pilatus PC-9Ms (machine gun pods, rocket pods) and the AgustaWestland AW139s (door machine guns) can be armed (by weapons add-ons, aircraft otherwise unarmed).

=== Acquisitions ===
In December 2024, the government ordered four Airbus H145M light utility helicopters for €91.7 million to arrive in 2027 to replace the EC135s used for pilot training.

Ireland lacks primary radar to detect hostile or suspicious aircraft. In December 2025, the government arranged for France to procure a radar system for Ireland, for possible use from 2028. Five mobile Thales manufactured radars were ordered in 2026.

== Roles ==
The roles and functions of the Air Corps are more akin to an army air corps rather than a conventional air force. The Air Corps has no air intercept capability, and very limited low-level ground attack capacity. The Air Corps can provide a day/night tactical helicopter troop transport, but without armed helicopter escort support.

As of 2026, the army-technology.com stated that "the Irish Air Corps lacks the ability to both detect aircraft with their transponders switched off and carry out interception missions of such aircraft" and that "due to Ireland's current military deficiencies, the country de facto relies on the UK for national defence", and in particular "Royal Air Force is relied upon for interception missions against suspicious aircraft."

The Air Corps non-military capabilities in aid to the civil power and other Government departments include ministerial transport, maritime patrol, police support, search and rescue support, air ambulance, aerial firefighting, and aerial surveillance, observation and photography.

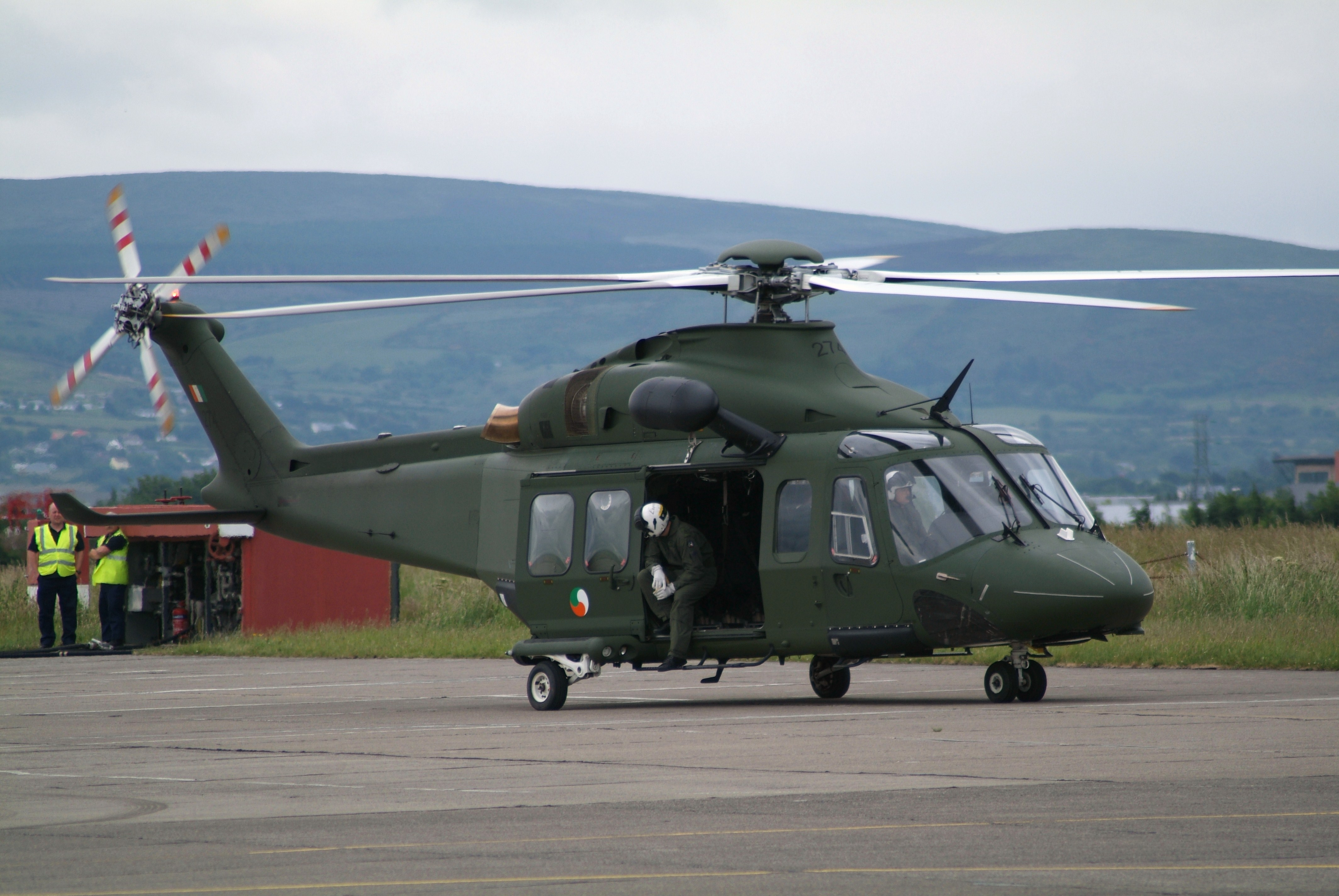
An Air Corps AgustaWestland AW139

=== Air ambulance ===
The Air Corps provides an air ambulance service for emergency rapid transfer of patients between hospitals, to hospitals from offshore islands, transferring patients for treatment overseas, and transporting emergency organ retrieval teams. The aircraft used are the AW139, EC135, C295, and Dassault Falcon.

An Air Corps AW139 also provides an Emergency Aeromedical Service for the National Ambulance Service based out of Custume Barracks in Athlone, providing an emergency patient airlift service from scenes of accidents to hospitals.

=== Maritime patrol ===
The Air Corps operates two Airbus C295 long-range maritime patrol aircraft in support of fishery protection, marine surveillance, and search and rescue.

=== Ministerial Air Transport Service ===
The Air Corps provides a Ministerial Air Transport Service (MATS) for the President and members of the Government in official engagements abroad. The Dassault Falcon 6X is used specifically for this purpose, with the AW139, EC135 and C295 occasionally used.

=== Garda Air Support ===
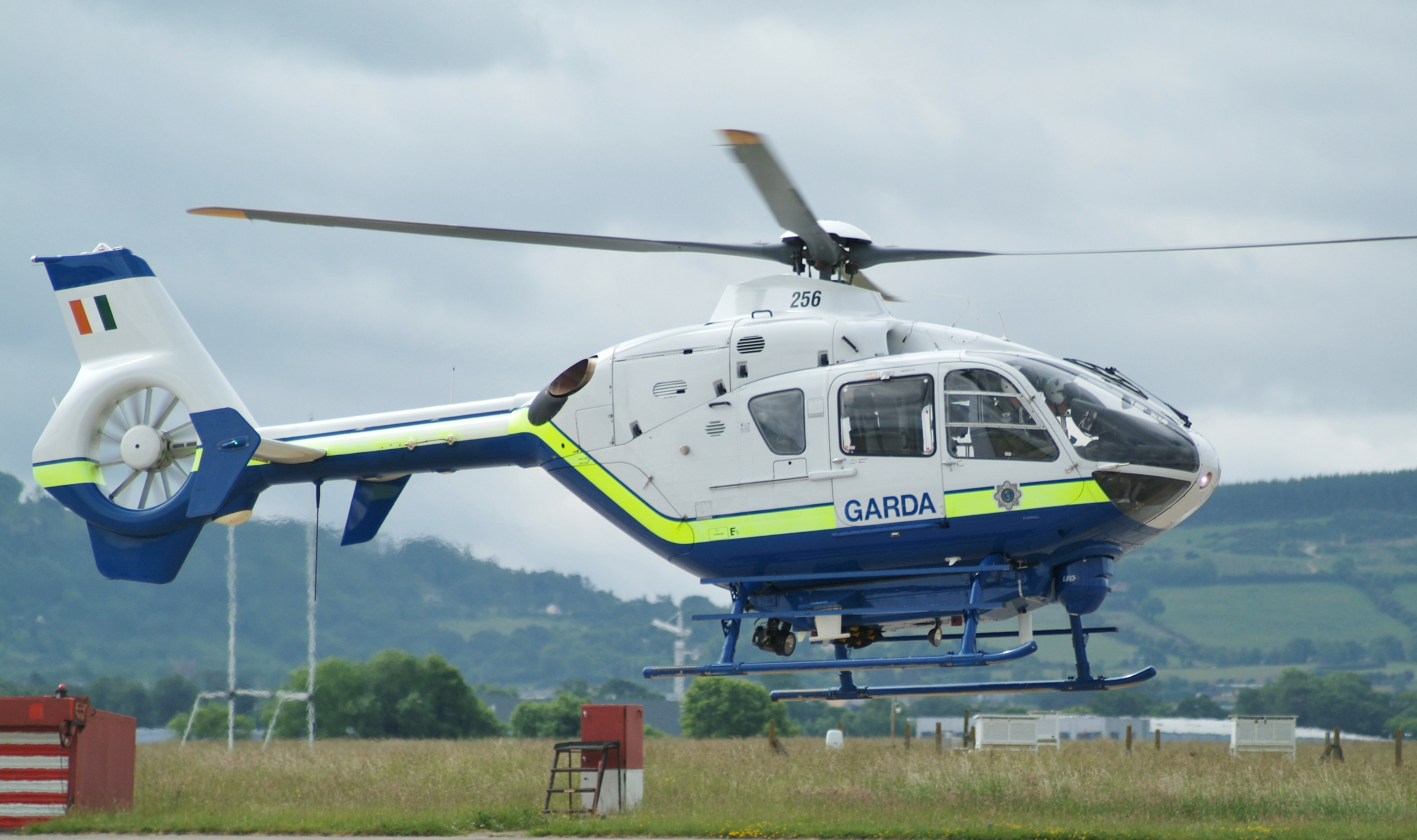
EC135 T2

The Garda Air Support Unit (GASU) provides specialist air support for the Garda Síochána, Ireland's national police force. The Air Corps provides three aircraft, two Eurocopter EC135 T2 helicopters and a DHC-6 Twin Otter fixed-wing surveillance aircraft, as well as pilots and aircraft technicians to the GASU. At the same time, the Department of Justice retains operational control of the aircraft.

=== Display team ===
The Irish Air Corps' display team is known as Silver Swallows.

== Ranks ==
The Air Corps' ranks are similar to those of the Irish Army. As of April 2023, the strength was 711 across all ranks.

=== Officer insignia ===
Rank group	General / flag officers					Senior officers			Junior officers
Irish Air Corps
Irish Air Corps		General	Lieutenant-general	Major-general	Brigadier-general	Colonel	Lieutenant-colonel	Commandant	Captain		Lieutenant	Second-lieutenant
Irish Air Corps		Ginearál	Lefteanant-ghinearál	Maor-ghinearál	Briogáidire-ghinearál	Cornal	Lefteanant-chornal	Ceannfort	Captaen		Lefteanant	Dara-lefteanant
Abbreviation	Lt Gen	Maj Gen	Brig Gen	Col	Lt Col	Comdt	Capt	Lt		2nd Lt	O-Cdt

=== Other rank insignia ===
Rank group	Senior NCOs					Junior NCOs		Enlisted
Irish Air Corps										No insignia
Irish Air Corps	Regimental sergeant major	Regimental quartermaster sergeant	Flight sergeant	Flight quartermaster sergeant	Sergeant	Corporal	Airman 3 star	Airman 2 star	Apprentice	Recruit
Irish Air Corps	Maor-sáirsint reisiminte	Ceathrúsháirsint reisiminte	Sáirsint eitleoige	Ceathrúsháirsint eitleoige	Sáirsint	Ceannaire	Eitleoir, 3 réalta	Eitleoir, 2 réalta	Printíseach	Earcach
Abbreviation	RSM	RQMS	FS	FQMS	Sgt	Cpl	Amn 3*	Amn 2*	App	Rec/G1

== See also ==
- Colonel James Fitzmaurice
- History of Ireland
- Irish State Aircraft
- List of aircraft of the Irish Air Corps
- Permanent Defence Force Other Ranks Representative Association
- Politics of the Republic of Ireland
- Representative Association of Commissioned Officers
- Reserve Defence Forces Representative Association
