= R410 road (Ireland) =

Road in Ireland

Coordinates: 53.199087°N 6.610822°W

R410 road
- Bóthar R410
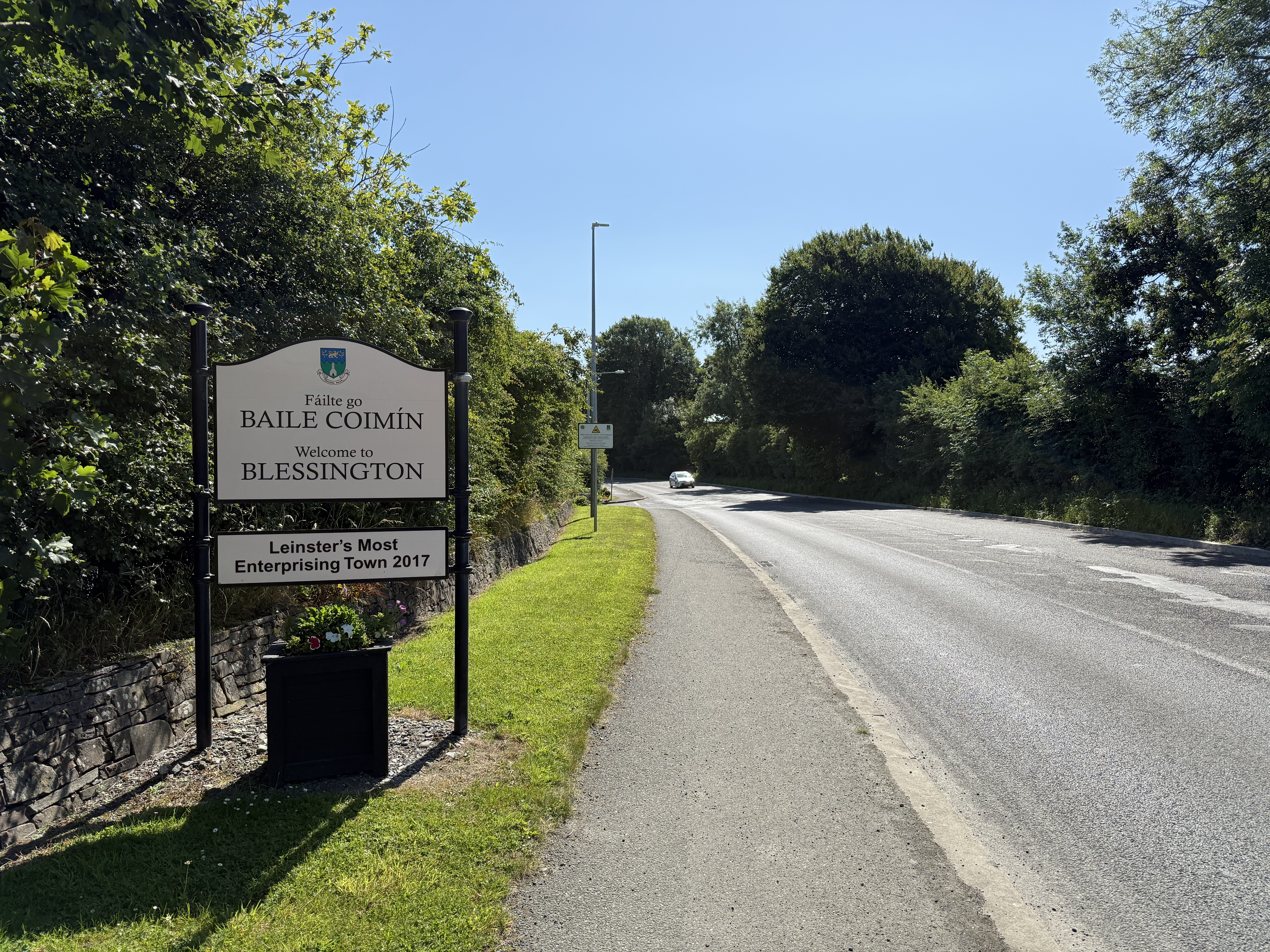
- R410 entering Blessington

Route information
- Length: 12.1 km (7.5 mi)

Major junctions
- From: R445 Naas
- Crosses Morell River; Passes through Eadestown; Enters County Wicklow
- To: N81 Blessington

Location
- Country: Ireland

Highway system
- Roads in Ireland; Motorways; Primary; Secondary; Regional

The R410 road, also called the Blessington Road, is a regional road in Ireland, located in County Wicklow and County Kildare.
