= John Joseph O'Callaghan =

Irish architect

- Born: 1838; Blackrock, Cork, Ireland
- Died: 2 November 1905 (aged 66–67); Dublin
- Occupation: architect

John Joseph O'Callaghan (1838 – 2 November 1905) was an Irish architect who designed buildings in both England and Ireland.

== Life ==
O'Callaghan was born in Blackrock, Cork around 1838. After training in Cork under John Benson, the county surveyor, he came to Dublin to join the practice of Thomas Newenham Deane and Benjamin Woodward. In 1856 he was sent as clerk of works to Oxford where he had the opportunity of studying mediaeval architecture. He became an advocate of the Gothic style, using elements such as polychrome brickwork, turrets, finials, ornate arches. He remained with Deane and Woodford until he set up his own business in Merrion Row in Dublin in 1871.

As a founding member, he was elected first president of the Architectural Association of Ireland in 1872. Later in life his work was described as "old-fashioned", in one obituary declared he was "unquestionably one of the foremost Irish architects of modern times."

O'Callaghan died on 2 November 1905. With his wife, Eva, he had 2 daughters and 6 sons. Two son, Lucius and Bernard, were architects, and Frank was a civil engineer.

== Select works ==
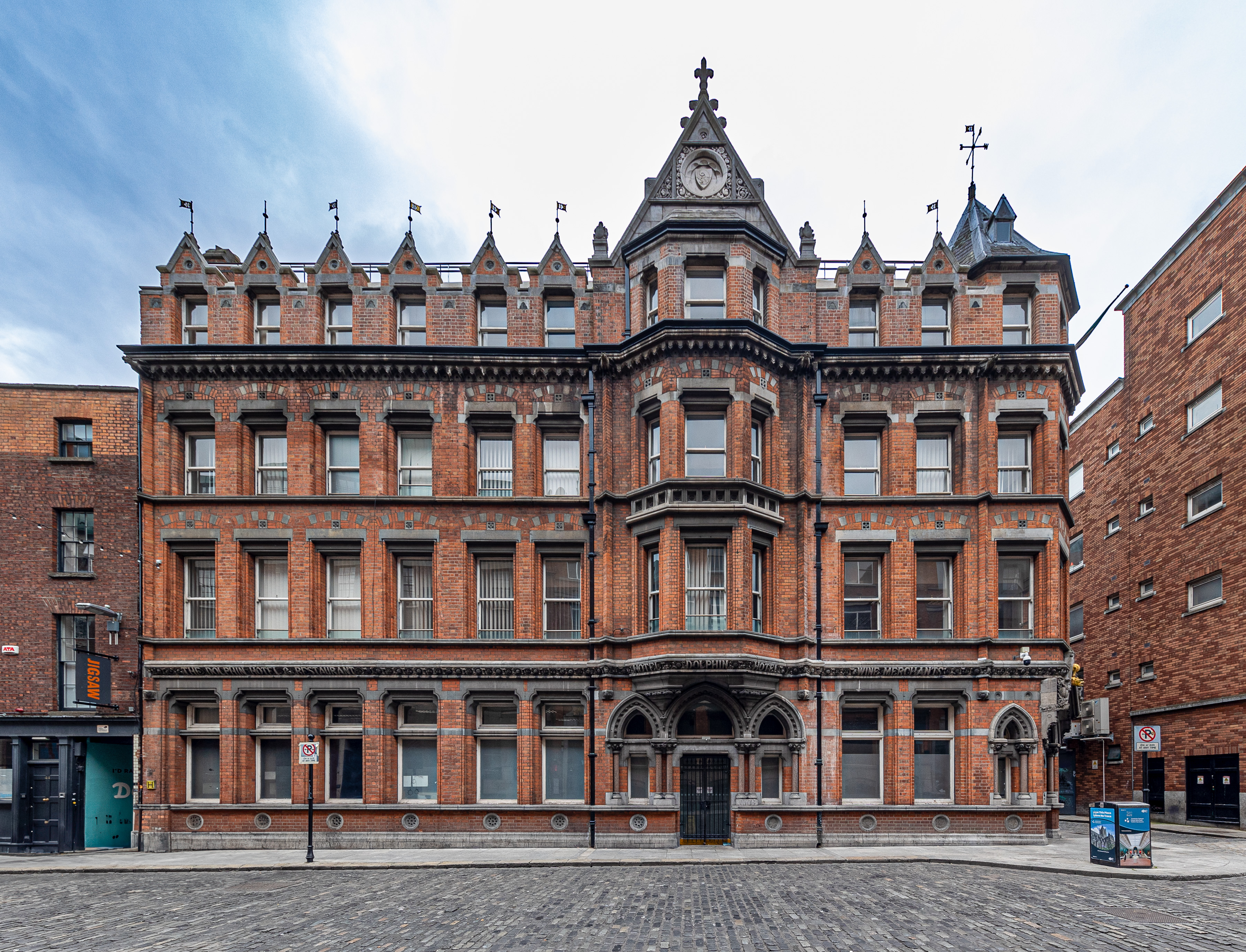
Dolphin House

- Dolphin House, Essex Street, Dublin
- Tickell Memorial Fountain, Eadestown, County Kildare
- The Glimmer Man pub, Stoneybatter, Dublin
- Lafayette Building, corner of Westmoreland Street and D'Olier Street, Dublin
- The O'Brien Institute, Marino, County Dublin
- St Brigid's Church, Clara, County Offaly
- St Joseph's Church, Mountmellick, County Laois
- St Mary's Church, Haddington Road, Dublin
- St Raphael's College, Loughrea, County Galway
- Synagogue, Adelaide Road, Dublin
