= O'Brien Institute =

Former residential orphan school, now fire brigade facility, Dublin, Ireland

Coordinates: 53.370638°N 6.228171°W

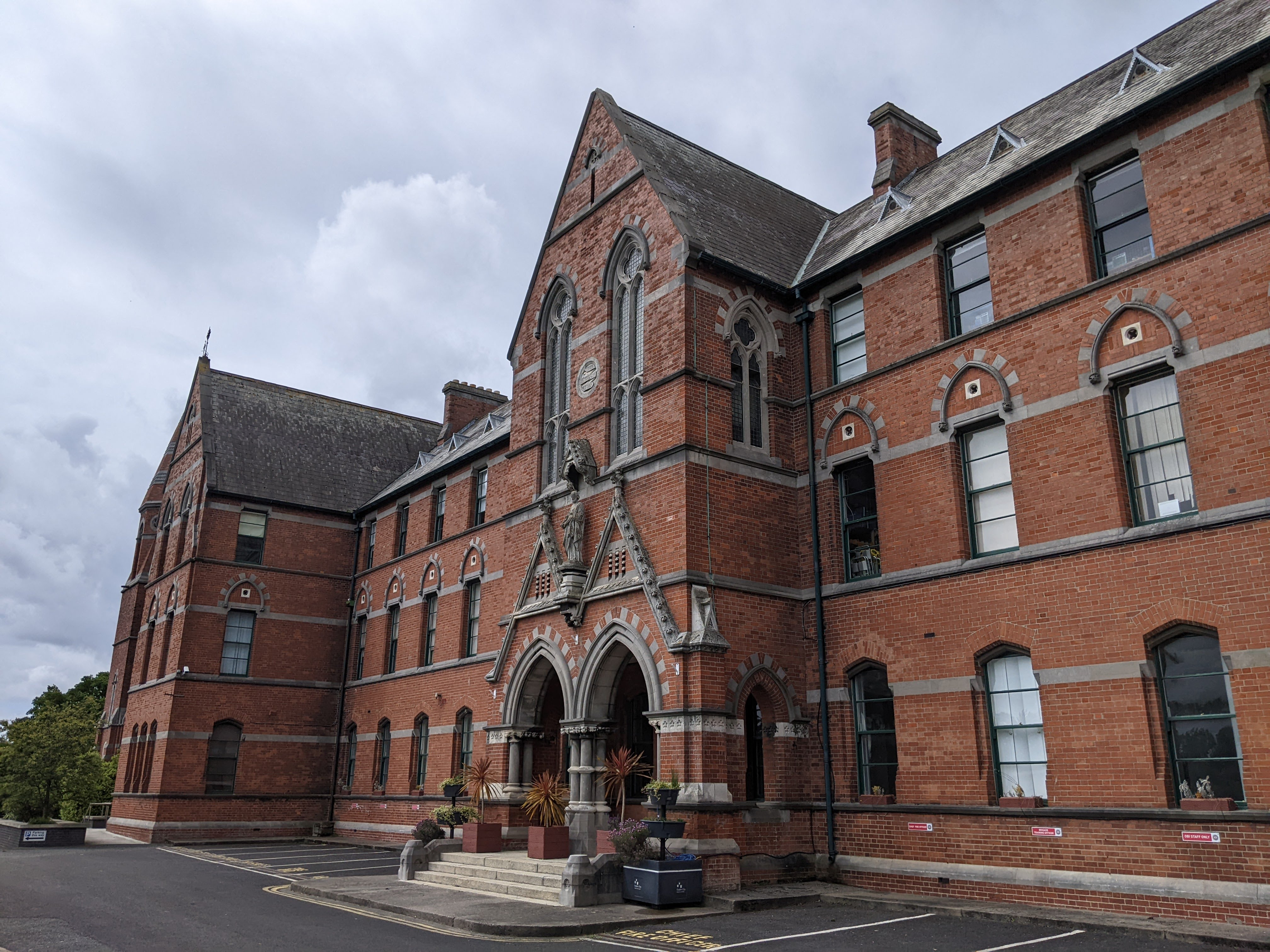
O'Brien Institute

The O'Brien Institute is a building complex off the Malahide Road, near Mount Temple Comprehensive School in Marino, Dublin, Ireland. Built in 1880–1883 as an orphan home and school, the purchase of the land, and building costs, were financed by a trust that was founded by the will of Bridget O'Brien in 1876. The last four boarders left in 1976, when the school, which was run by the Irish Christian Brothers, closed. The institute was bought by Dublin Corporation, and is currently primarily used by Dublin Fire Brigade as a training centre, while the educational trust continues within the Archdiocese of Dublin.

== The O'Brien Educational Trust ==
The institute was founded based on a will trust formed by bequest by Bridget O'Brien.

The Trust continues today, as the O’Brien Twin Sisters Educational Trust, administered by the Trustees of the Archdiocese of Dublin through the diocesan finance secretariat. It accepts applications from schools, families and others for funding for educational needs of disadvantaged Catholic children that might otherwise be missed, and the trustees have taken a special interest in DEIS schools. Funding has been provided for books, equipment (IT, music and special materials for those needing specific sensory stimulation), sporting facilities, extra-curricular and after-school activities, and assessments.

== Construction ==
The architect was John Joseph O'Callaghan. Construction commenced in 1880. The contractors were Messrs. Hammond and Co., based in Dublin and Drogheda, J.J. O'Callaghan carried out the construction supervision himself.

In August 1883 the works were nearly finished. The Irish builder described the building's chapel:

"The chapel consists of chancel, choir, seculars’ chapel, sacristy, and belfry. A large organ gallery is situated at the west end [Note: in fact it is the south-east – end], and is approached by circular stairs, making a bold feature in connection with the west [south-east] gable. The chapel is connected with the main building by a cloister corridor about 30 ft in length. The belfry is situated at the north-west end [in fact south-west], and forms a porch to secular chapel, and is surmounted by an octagon spire, which, like the rest of the building, is built in brick. The dressings generally are in Drogheda limestone, while the walls throughout are built of brick from Kingscourt, Co. Cavan. The roof is open timbered to the curved ribs, and is paneled; the windows are glazed in lead lights. The woodwork is painted two shades, plain colour."

The Dublin newspapers wrote that the chapel "adds much to the general architectural effect", and added:

"The chapel has an apsidal end nave, and contains a handsomely-designed organ gallery and Communion rails, seats of pitch pine, and an extremely effective Portland stone altar. The large wheel window in the east gable adding much to the appearance of the elevation. A belfry of brick, with stone dressing, completes the design of the S.E. angle."

Next to the institute is the Casino at Marino folly.

== Development ==
In the 1960s, a former grazing field at the Malahide Road end of the institute's land was given to the Sisters of Nazareth for the construction of Nazareth House, a residential home for the elderly. Archbishop John McQuaid organised the transfer of the land, and construction began on the new home months before planning permission was granted. The development was a significant encroachment on the neighbouring Casino, obstructing the vista of the ornamental building from the road.

== Dublin Corporation and the Fire Brigade ==
=== Dublin Fire Brigade Museum ===
The city's museum of fires and the fire service occupies two floors at the institute.

== Status ==
The original buildings of the Institution are listed buildings, reference 4940 in the Dublin City Development Plan 2005–2011.
