= Silver Swallows =

Irish Air Corps Aerobatic Display Team

Silver Swallows Irish Air Corps Aerobatic Display Team
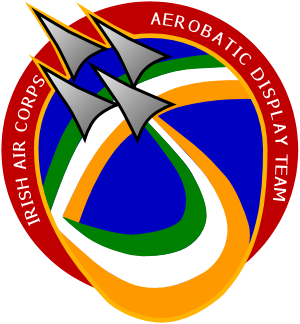
- Silver Swallows Irish Air Corps Aerobatic Display Team badge
- Active: 1982 – 1998; 2022 - present
- Country: Ireland
- Branch: Irish Air Corps; Light Strike Squadron (1982–1998); Flying Training School (2004–present)
- Role: Formation & aerobatic flight display team
- Size: 4 military training aircraft
- Airbase: Casement Aerodrome
- Colours: Silver

Aircraft flown
- Trainer: Fouga CM.170-2 Super Magister (former); Pilatus PC-9M (current)

The Silver Swallows is the name given to the officially named Irish Air Corps Aerobatic Display Team. Originally active from 1982 to 1998, it was reformed in 2022. The team was originally equipped with four Fouga CM.170-2 Super Magister jet trainers, and was drawn from the Light Strike Squadron of the Irish Air Corps, based at Casement Aerodrome, Baldonnel near Dublin. Since reforming in 2022, it now uses the Pilatus PC-9M turbo-prop trainer.

The name 'Silver Swallows' was derived from the colour of its original aircraft, and the V-shaped tail of the Magister aircraft the team flew. Throughout its history, the team is operated on a part-time basis, with the display duties of the team being secondary to the primary roles of the Light Strike Squadron, and its successor host unit. Their aircraft usually trail white smoke, however, since 2016, can trail green, white, and orange smoke (representing the national Flag of Ireland) at national flypasts and other select events.

== Display history ==
This four-ship team first performed for the 60th anniversary of the formation of the Irish Air Corps in 1982, with their silver Fouga CM.170 Magister trainers (introduced to the Air Corps in 1975); performing a display designed to keep the team as close as possible to the crowd, and incorporated the concept of breaking up and reforming while flying aerobatic manoeuvres. The team performed its first formation loop at the Air Spectacular at Fairyhouse in 1983. Formation aerobatics was continued in 1985 and 1986. The 'Silver Swallows' were named during the Air Spectacular held at Baldonnel in August 1987. This same event saw the team again use a fourth Magister.

The team made few appearances outside their own country during its existence, their first overseas display being carried out in Wales at the RAF Brawdy Open Day on 26 July 1990. Their next overseas displays didn't take place until 1997, when the team visited a number of airshows in the United Kingdom and Belgium to commemorate the Air Corps' 75th anniversary. They appeared at the 1997 Royal International Air Tattoo at RAF Fairford in Gloucestershire, England, where the team was awarded the prestigious Lockheed Martin Cannestra Trophy for the Best Display by an Overseas Performer. During 1998, the team was disbanded owing to the upcoming retirement of the Fouga Magister from Irish Air Corps service.

In the early 2000s, an Air Corps aerobatic display used the SIAI Marchetti SF-260WE 'Warrior' piston-engined training aircraft and were known as "Team Warrior".

In 2004, the Air Corps received its new training aircraft; the Swiss-built Pilatus PC-9M entered service. Thereafter, PC-9M formation displays occurred, trailing white smoke, though not using its former Silver Swallows moniker. In 2016, six PC-9M aircraft performed a flypast over Dublin to celebrate the centenary of the Easter Rising; for the first time trailing green, white, and orange smoke. Later the same year, four Irish PC-9s trailer the same tricolour smoke during an aerobatic display at the Bray Air Display at Bray, County Wicklow.

2022 was the centenary of the Irish Air Corps, and the Silver Swallows name returned, established with four Pilatus PC-9Ms from Air Corps College, Flying Training School (IAC FTS). The display pilots are selected from the instructional staff; and are currently the Officer Commanding FTS, the Chief Flying Instructor, the Chief Ground Instructor, and the Chief Simulator Instructor. Their first public experience was on 10 July 2022 for the National Day of Commemoration in Collins Barracks in Dublin, performing a flypast on the last notes of Amhrán na bhFiann. The first full display was the 2022 Royal International Air Tattoo at RAF Fairford, 25 years after their last visit; performing a half-hour four-ship display, also performing at the Bray International Air Display later that month. The Silver Swallows would also escort the Battle of Britain Memorial Flight (BBMF) of the UK's Royal Air Force (RAF) during displays over Dublin to commemorate Veterans Day. In 2024, three Silver Swallows aircraft performed at the Sanicole International Airshow held at the Kleine-Brogel Air Base in Belgium. During 2025, the team primarily displayed throughout Ireland.
