= HSE National Ambulance Service =

Irish ambulance service

National Ambulance Service
- Formation: 2005
- Legal status: Active
- Headquarters: National Emergency Operations Centre, Tallaght
- Region served: Ireland
- Leadership: Robert Morton (Director)
- Website: http://www.nationalambulanceservice.ie/
- Remarks: Appointment: Minister for Health

The National Ambulance Service (Irish: An tSeirbhís Náisiúnta Otharchairr) is the statutory public ambulance service in Ireland. The service is operated by the National Hospitals Office of the Health Service Executive, the Irish national healthcare authority.

== History ==
The Health Act, 1970 allowed for the provision of an ambulance service by each of the eight health boards for their respective area. The health board ambulance services operated independently of each other, being funded from their board budget. In 1986, the National Ambulance Training School was established to provide training to ambulance staff on a national level, catering for the progression of pre-hospital care and the development of skills in the ambulance service as a whole. This was the first step towards nationalisation of the service, however it was not until 2005 with the establishment of the Health Service Executive (HSE) that the new National Ambulance Service was established. With the new service being established, and with the new training standards implemented by the Pre-Hospital Emergency Care Council, the service acquired a national insignia, standardised uniforms, vehicles and equipment as well as a national recruitment process for staff. The National Ambulance Training School was renamed the National Ambulance Service College to reflect the new organisational structure.

== Uniform, vehicles and equipment ==
The operational uniform consists of green cargo trousers with a white open-neck shirt bearing the ambulance service crest as well as high-visibility outerwear for night time and poor visibility conditions. Clinical grade is depicted by use of coloured shoulder sliders; green for emergency medical technician, Pale blue for student paramedic, pale blue with navy stripe for paramedic intern, navy for paramedic, yellow for advanced paramedic and red for control operations staff. The dress uniform is navy blue with a white shirt and peaked cap. All front line ambulances operated by the service are CEN compliant. Almost identical to UK ambulances, they are yellow in colour with green and yellow battenburg markings along the vehicle. They are fitted with emergency lighting, digital Tetra radios, touchscreen data terminals, satellite navigation and tracking systems. The ambulance saloon is fully insulated with environmental control. Equipment includes a CEN stretcher, cardiac monitor/defibrillator, suction unit, diagnostic equipment, trauma kits, resuscitation kits, medications and oxygen. Ambulances are also capable of securely holding an incubator in place of a stretcher.

== National Ambulance Service College ==
The National Ambulance Service College (NASC) (Irish: Coláiste Náisiúnta an tSeirbhís Otharchairr) was first established in 1986 as the National Ambulance Training School and is based at the organisation's new HQ named the Rivers Building in Tallaght, which also houses the National Emergency Operations Centre (NEOC). 999/112 emergency calls are processed here also, as well as a second base in Ballyshannon, Donegal. Up until then, St. Mary's Hospital in the Phoenix Park, Dublin was the training location. There is also a second campus based in Ballinasloe, County Galway, which trains paramedics and Intermediate Care Operatives. In 2021 a third college was opened in Tullamore, County Offaly, this college serves as a training centre for paramedics. The colleges provide training to NAS staff, hospital staff, An Garda Síochána, Irish Defence Forces personnel and fire service personnel. All colleges are operated by the National Ambulance Service and most of its courses are approved by the Pre-Hospital Emergency Care Council (PHECC). Paramedic and advanced paramedic programmes are conducted in conjunction with University College Cork.

== Command and control ==
Calls from the public to 999/112 are processed using the advanced medical priority dispatch system. Call takers ask the caller a series of structured questions and assign a determinant code to the call based on that information. This information is then passed on to the paramedics to determine a blue light or non-blue light response to the call. The National Emergency Operations Center (NEOC) is located in Tallaght, Dublin. This centre is responsible for the deployment of ambulances at national level with the exception of Dublin, and incorporates a national computer-aided dispatch (CAD) system as well as an integrated national terrestrial trunked radio (TETRA) system on a statewide network. In 2014, the rollout of the TETRA system was completed and all ambulances are now fitted with TETRA terminals. In addition all paramedics are issued with hand-portable TETRA radios. These systems allow controllers to dispatch the closest available NAS ambulance to the scene. Dublin Fire Brigade also have a control centre located in their headquarters in Tara Street and handle 999 ambulance calls for the four Dublin local authorities.

== Emergency ambulance service ==
The National Ambulance Service directly provides all 999 emergency ambulance services in Ireland. The exception is Dublin, where in addition to the National Ambulance Service, Dublin City Council operates under service-level agreement to the Health Service Executive to provide an ambulance service through the Dublin Local Authorities Fire and Emergency Service (DLAFES). This service currently operates under its own command and control and with the exception of Health Service Executive funding, is entirely independent of the National Ambulance Service. In 2013, a draft proposal by the HSE addressed concerns with the system of ambulance provision in the Dublin area. The concerns were related to the lack of integration between the two services from a command and control perspective and the fact that Dublin City Council does not fall under the remit of the healthcare watchdog Health Information and Quality Authority (HIQA). In 2014, a joint review of the ambulance service in Dublin was announced by Dublin City Council, the HSE and HIQA to address concerns raised about how the DFB ambulance service is being run in comparison to the NAS. Matters to be reviewed include the way ambulances are dispatched, service provision and value for money. As of 2014, Dublin City Council receives a payment of almost €10 million per annum from the National Ambulance Service budget to fund the DLAFES ambulance service. The HSE stated that the National Ambulance Service could provide the entire Dublin ambulance service directly for around €3 million per annum less. In 2016 an independent national capacity review of the ambulance service was carried out by UK company Lightfoot Solutions with consultation from the NHS Association of Ambulance Chief Executives which indicated that an additional 200 staff were needed in order for the NAS to take over the DFB ambulance provision which currently consists of 14 ambulances operated through its 900 staff. In 2023, a joint report by Dublin City Council and the Health Service Executive that was completed in 2016 and withheld from the public domain was released after the broadsheet newspaper The Irish Times sought its publication through a freedom of information request. The findings of this review highlighted serious flaws in the delivery of the Dublin ambulance service primarily because of a lack of integration between the two services with regard to the processing of calls and dispatch of ambulance vehicles. The matter was subsequently raised in parliament during a meeting of the public accounts committee and led to the formation of a “task and finish” group to formulate a solution. After several meetings the group agreed in the interim to offset the inherent risk of having two services operating in the same city by placing two NAS controllers in the DFB control room with access to the DFB computer-aided dispatch system and conversely having two DFB controllers in NAS NEOC performing a similar function.

== Motorcycle Response Unit ==
The Motorcycle Response Unit (MRU) currently operates in Dublin and Cork City. The fleet of high-powered touring motorcycles are available when required to respond to various trauma/medical incidents. Riders are paramedics recruited from within the service. In October 2018, a Motorcycle Response Unit was added to Cork City. The bikes used are Honda NT650V Deauvilles and BMW RT1200's.

== Emergency Aeromedical Service ==
The Emergency Aeromedical Service is an air ambulance based at Custume Barracks in Athlone, jointly operated by airmen from No 3 Operations Wing of the Air Corps and advanced paramedics from NAS designated callsign Air Corps 112. It principally responds to remote areas which would be otherwise difficult to access by road. In 2019, the Irish Community Air Ambulance was launched based in Rathcoole, North Cork designated callsign Helimed 92. This community funded charity service, like the Emergency Aeromedical Service Air Corps 112, is tasked to calls by the National Emergency Operations Centre (NEOC). This service can respond to any point in a 25,000 km^{2} radius from its base in North Cork within 30 minutes. In 2020 this service responded to 490 incidents across 13 counties, this increased to 512 incidents across 14 counties in 2021 and in the first four months of 2022 the service has responded to 325 emergencies.

== Intermediate care ==
In addition to frontline emergency ambulance services, the HSE National Ambulance Service provides a routine and non-routine inter-facility transfer service 24 hours a day. In 2012, NAS introduced the Intermediate Care Vehicle (ICV). This specially designed vehicle is equipped and crewed for the purpose of providing an inter-facility transfer service and responding to low acuity 999 calls, which in turn will make more frontline vehicles, crewed by paramedics and advanced paramedics, available for emergencies.ICVs are capable of being utilised as first responders/additional vehicles for emergencies. The vehicles are crewed by two Pre Hospital Emergency Care Council (PHECC) registered Emergency Medical Technicians (formerly known as Intermediate Care Operatives (ICOs).

== Specialist services ==
The NAS is also responsible for providing decontamination services in the event of a chemical, biological or nuclear incident. A special-purpose Incident Response Team (IRT) is available to deploy and operate the decontamination service. The Marine Ambulance Response Team (MART) was established primarily in response to concerns of the risk of mass casualty/mass patient incidents on board the many Irish Sea ferry services travelling between Ireland and Great Britain. This service is provided in conjunction with the Irish Coast Guard and Dublin Fire Brigade. The NAS also provides a Neonatal Intensive Care emergency ambulance service and a Mobile Intensive Care Unit which are available 24-hours a day nationwide to transport their respective patients and medical teams to specialised facilities.

== Classification and resource allocation times ==
. Class	HSE ambulance call response classifications	. Resource allocation time
AS1/Code 1	999 emergency call – immediate response	Within 180 seconds from call start
AS2/Code 2	Call transferred from GP – urgent response	Within 4 hours
AS3/Code 3	Inter-hospital transfer of patients to specialist facilities	
PTS	Community transfer service for patients requiring scheduled in-hospital care	

== Gallery ==
National Ambulance Service

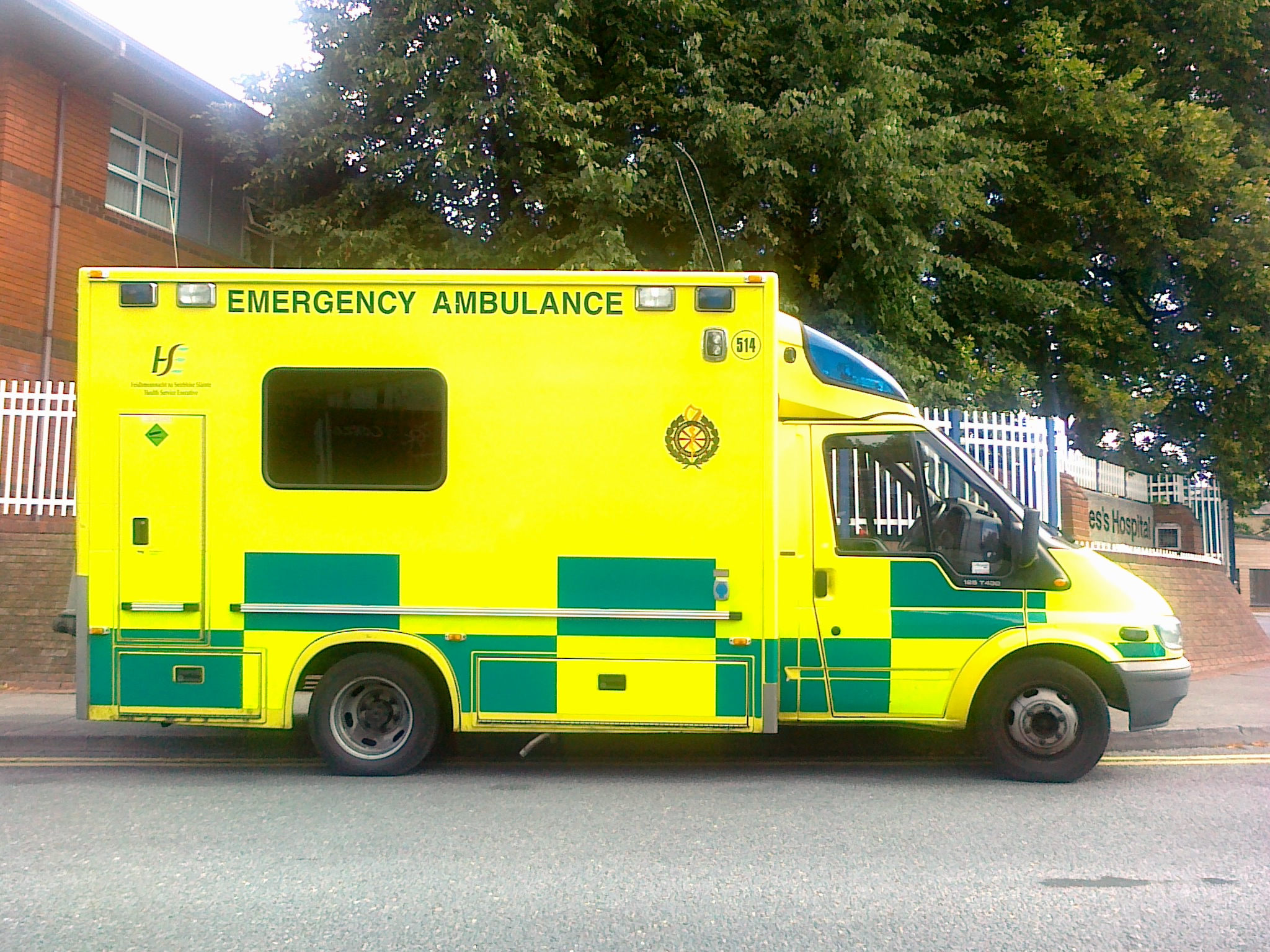
HSE-NAS emergency ambulance at St. James's Hospital, Dublin

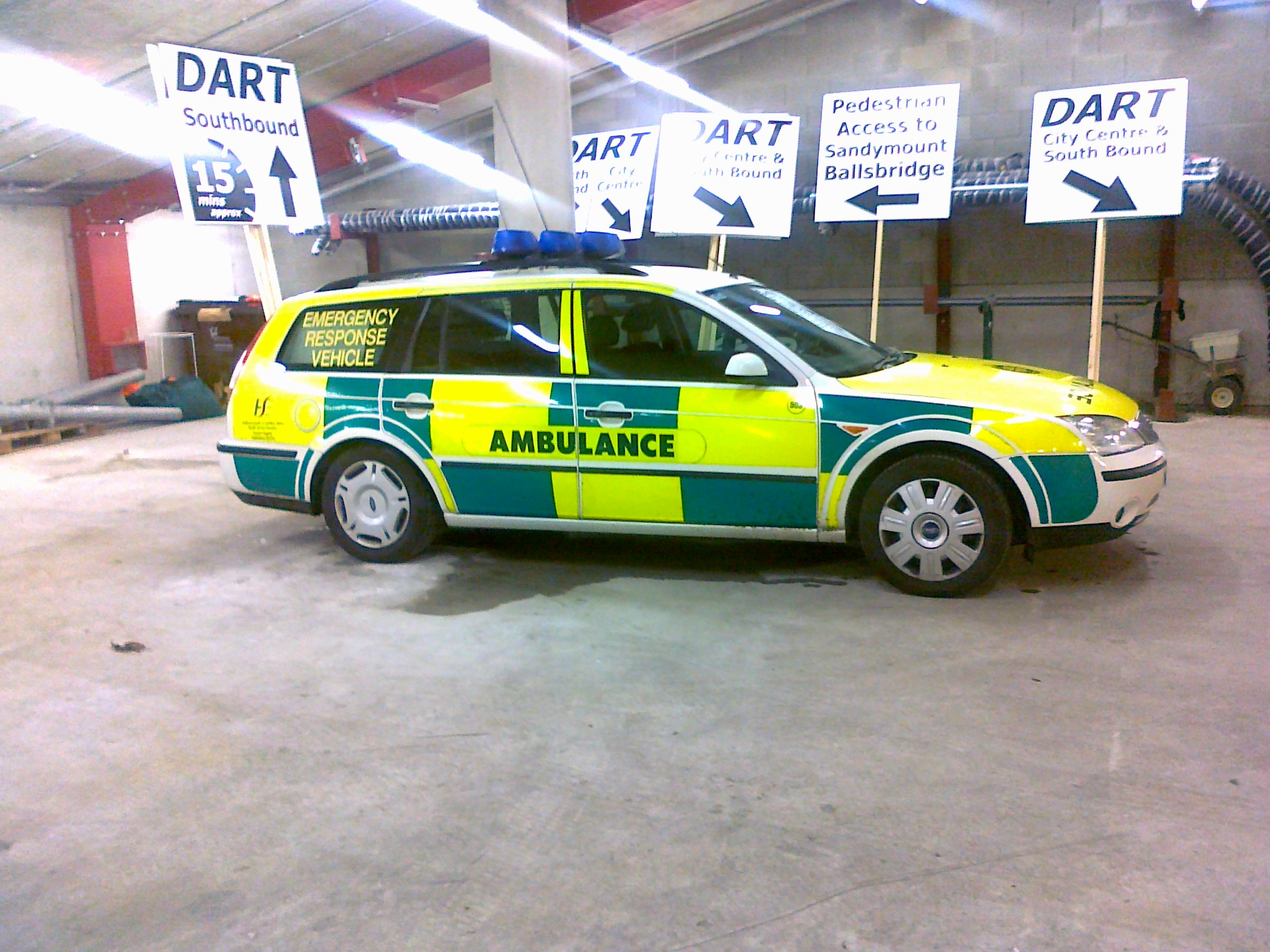
Ford Mondeo response car at the Aviva Stadium

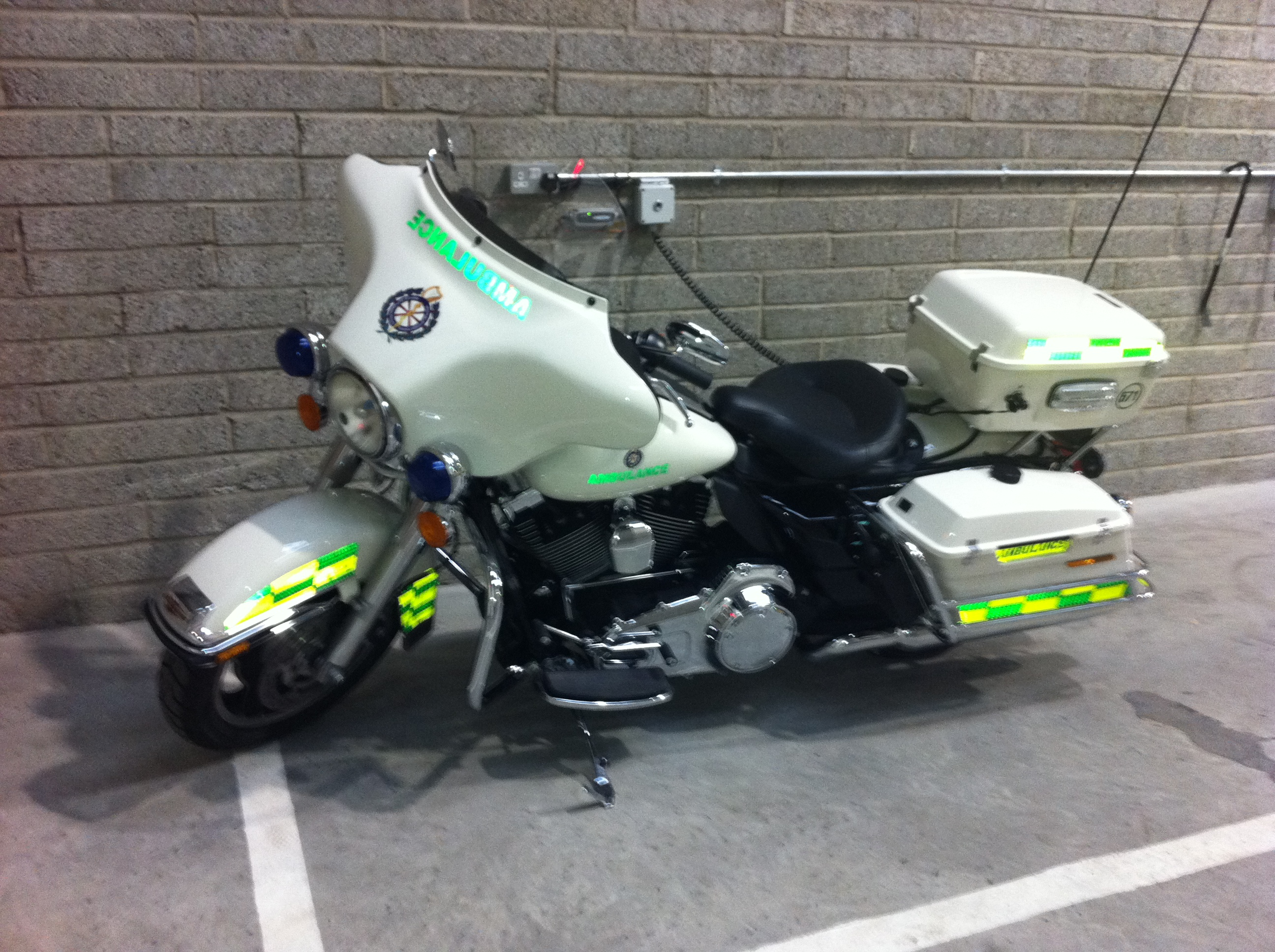
Harley-Davidson rapid-response motorcycle

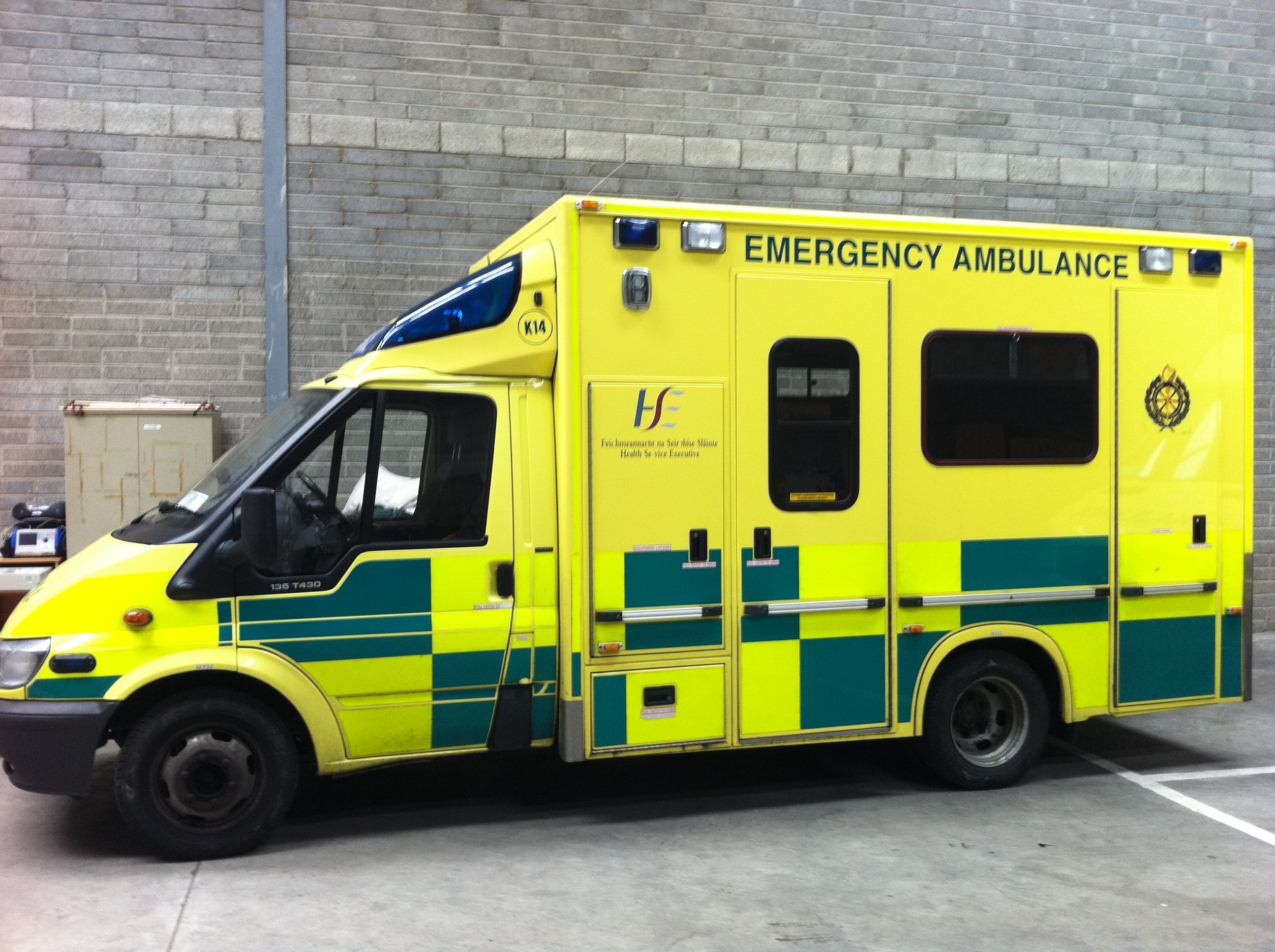
Ford Transit CEN ambulance

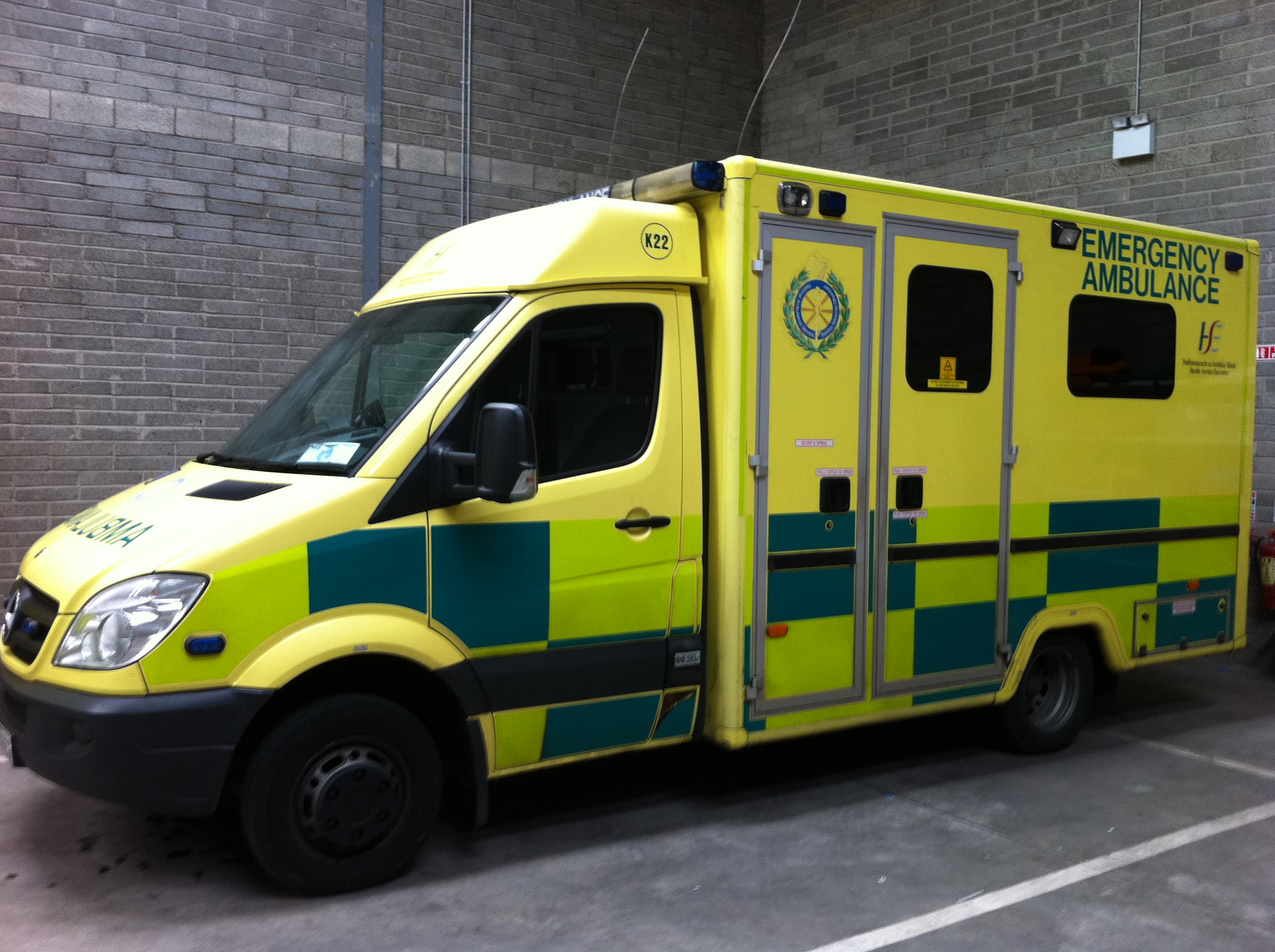
Mercedes-Benz Sprinter CEN ambulance

== See also ==
- PHECC
- Health care in the Republic of Ireland
