= Eadestown =

Village in County Kildare, Ireland

Eadestown Baile Éide
- Village
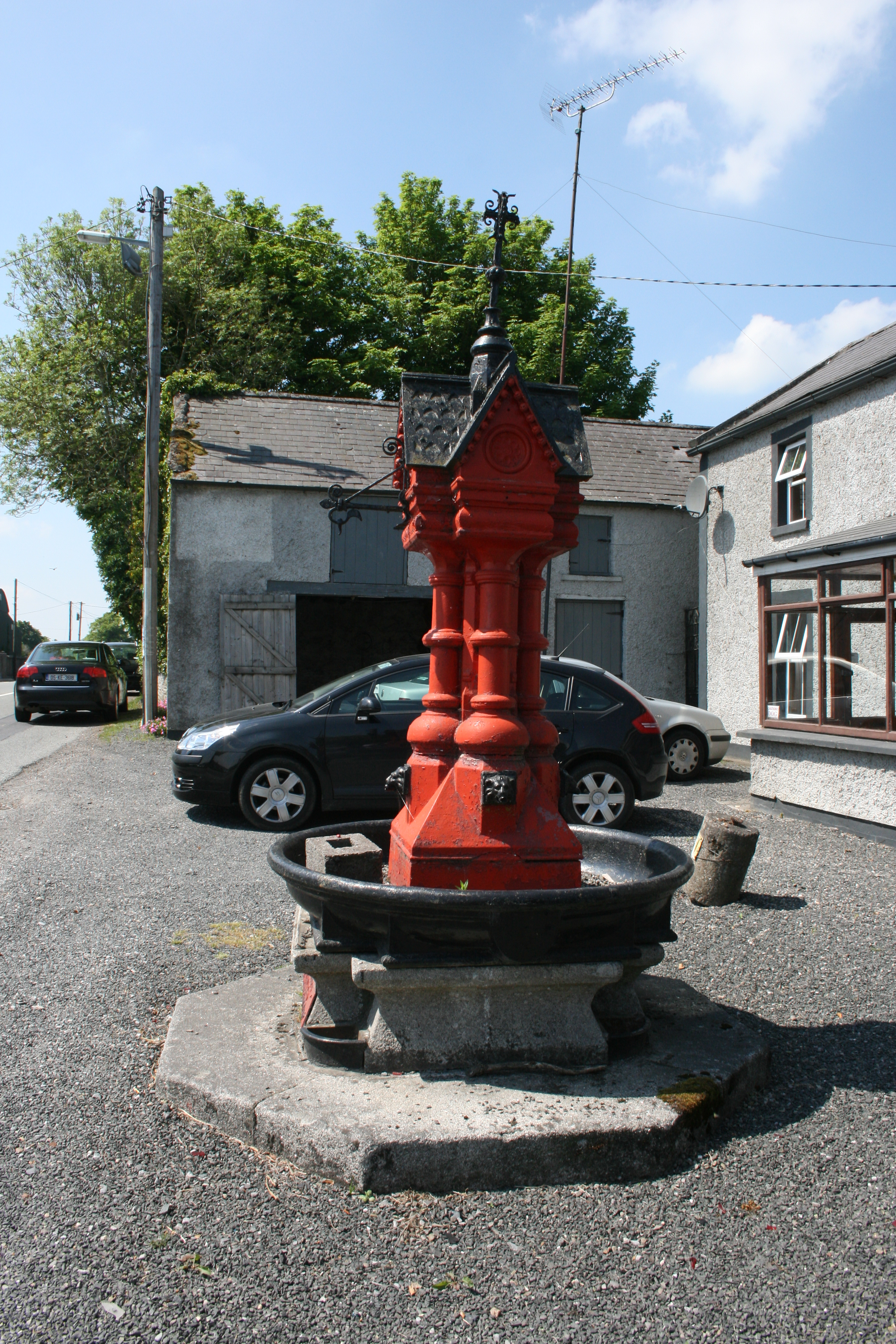
- Eadestown village

- Location in Ireland
- Coordinates: 53°12′10″N 6°34′40″W
- Country: Ireland
- Province: Leinster
- County: County Kildare
- Time zone: UTC+0 (WET)
  - Summer (DST): UTC-1 (IST (WEST))

Eadestown (/ˈiːdstaʊn/, locally /ˈeɪds-/; Irish: Baile Éide) is a townland and parish in County Kildare, Ireland. It is situated on the R410 Regional Road south of Naas, between Naas and Blessington, County Wicklow.

== Eadestown Parish ==
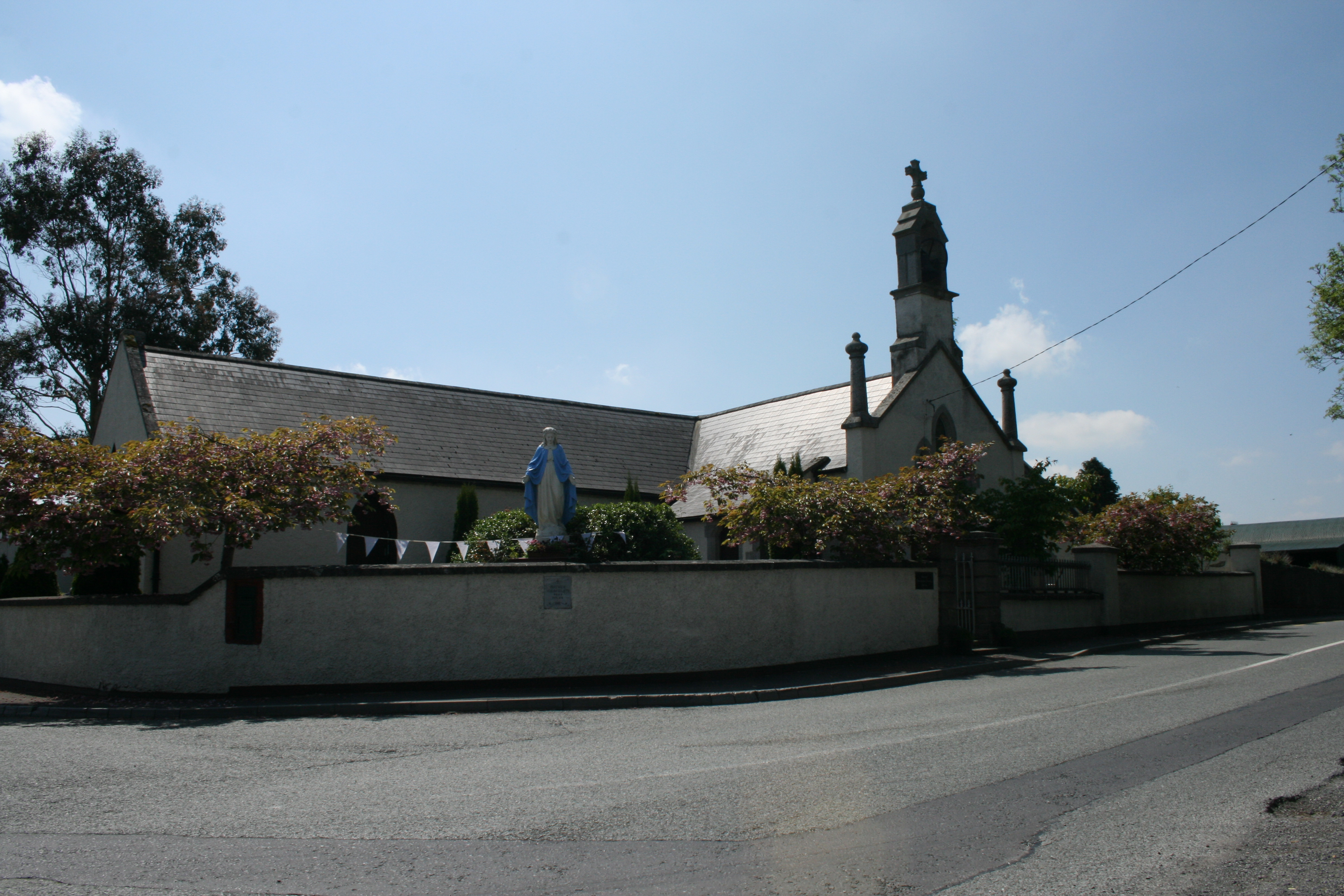
The Church of the Immaculate Conception, Eadestown

The Parish of Eadestown is composed of the civil parishes of Rathmore, Kilteel, Tipper and Haynestown. Its churches include the Church of the Immaculate Conception, Eadestown and St. Laurence O'Toole, Kilteel.

In 1995-2004 the parish was run by the "racing" priest Fr. Sean Breen. Breen's "Heavenly syndicate" won €170,000 from one of its horses in 2002-2003.

The parish church was altered and renovated by the noted church architect John Joseph Robinson, of Robinson and Keefe Architects for Rev.W. Lockhart P.P. in 1923. He subsequently designed the cathedral of Our Lady and St. Nicholas in Galway.

== Tickell Memorial Fountain ==
A cast-iron fountain in the village, dated 1899, was erected in memory of Captain Thomas Tickell (1817-98) of Cheltenham in Gloucester by his County Kildare tenantry. It was cast by Tonge and Taggart (established 1869) of Dublin to designs by John Joseph O'Callaghan (c.1838-1905) of Nassau Street, Dublin. The fountain was designed for drinking at three levels with the lion-head spouts for humans, the circular trough for horses and the quarter-circle dishes at ground level for hounds. The fountain is now disused.

== Sport ==
Eadestown GAA club is based in Eadestown. The team won the Kildare Senior Football Championship in 1970. The club fields underage teams and also competes in the Kildare Senior Championship.

Punchestown Racecourse is also located in Eadestown and this hosts many annual meetings, including the national hunt festival, which is usually held in late April.

== Notable people ==
- Tadhg Beirne, international rugby union player for the Irish national team
- Jimmy O'Brien, international rugby union player for the Irish national team
- Diarmuid Kilgallen, rugby player with Munster Rugby
- Rowan Osborne, rugby player who formerly played for Leinster and Munster
- Larry Tompkins, former Gaelic football manager and player

== See also ==
- List of towns and villages in Ireland
