= Dublin Fire Brigade =

Fire and rescue service for County Dublin, Ireland

Operational area
- Country: Ireland
- County: County Dublin

Agency overview
- Employees: 900
- Chief Fire Officer: Greg O’Dwyer

Facilities and equipment
- Stations: 14
- Engines: 21
- Platforms: 3
- Rescues: 2
- Ambulances: 14
- HAZMAT: 2
- Rescue boats: 2

Website
- Official website

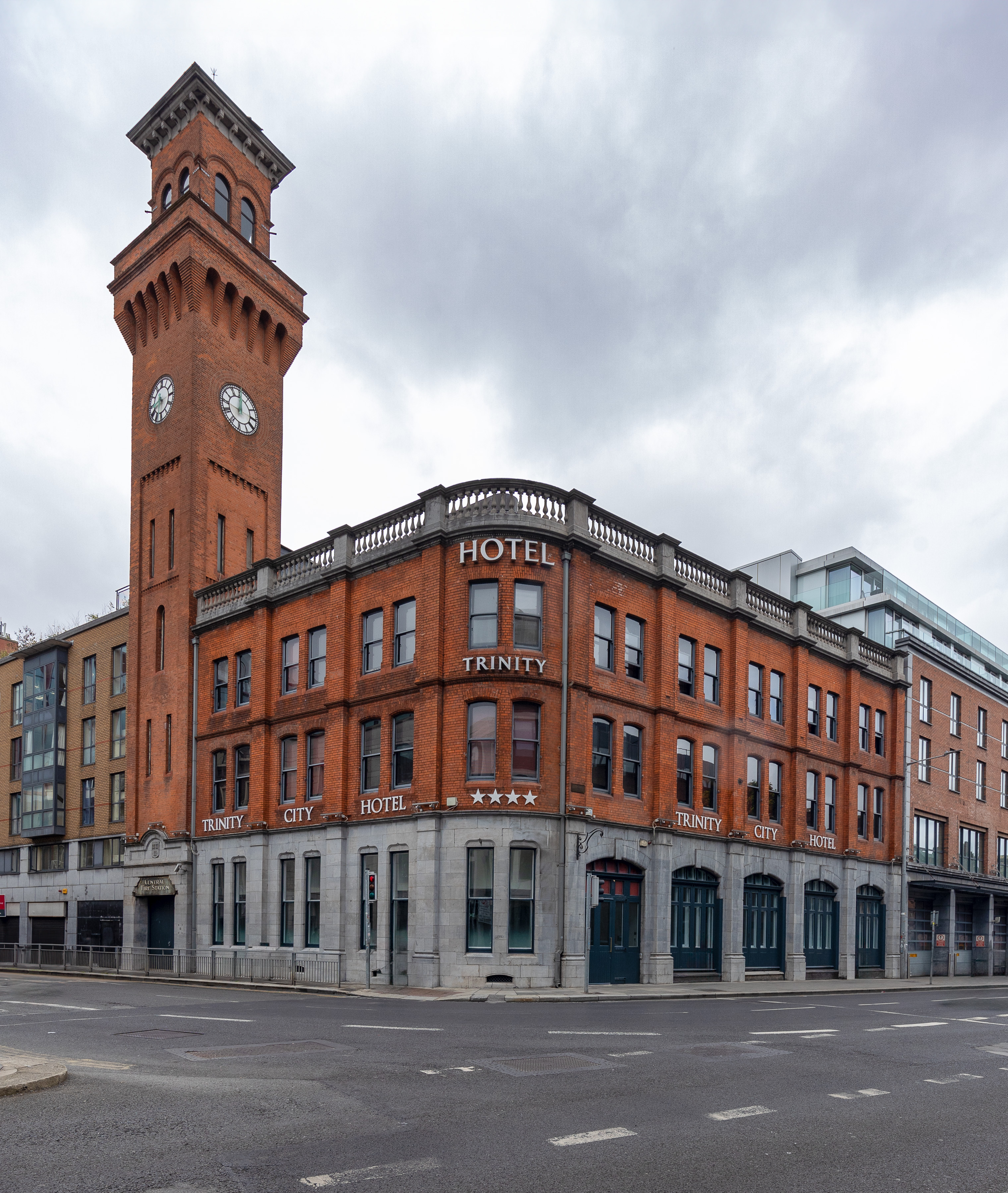
Former Central Fire Station (1906), one of three Dublin fire stations built in the early 20th century

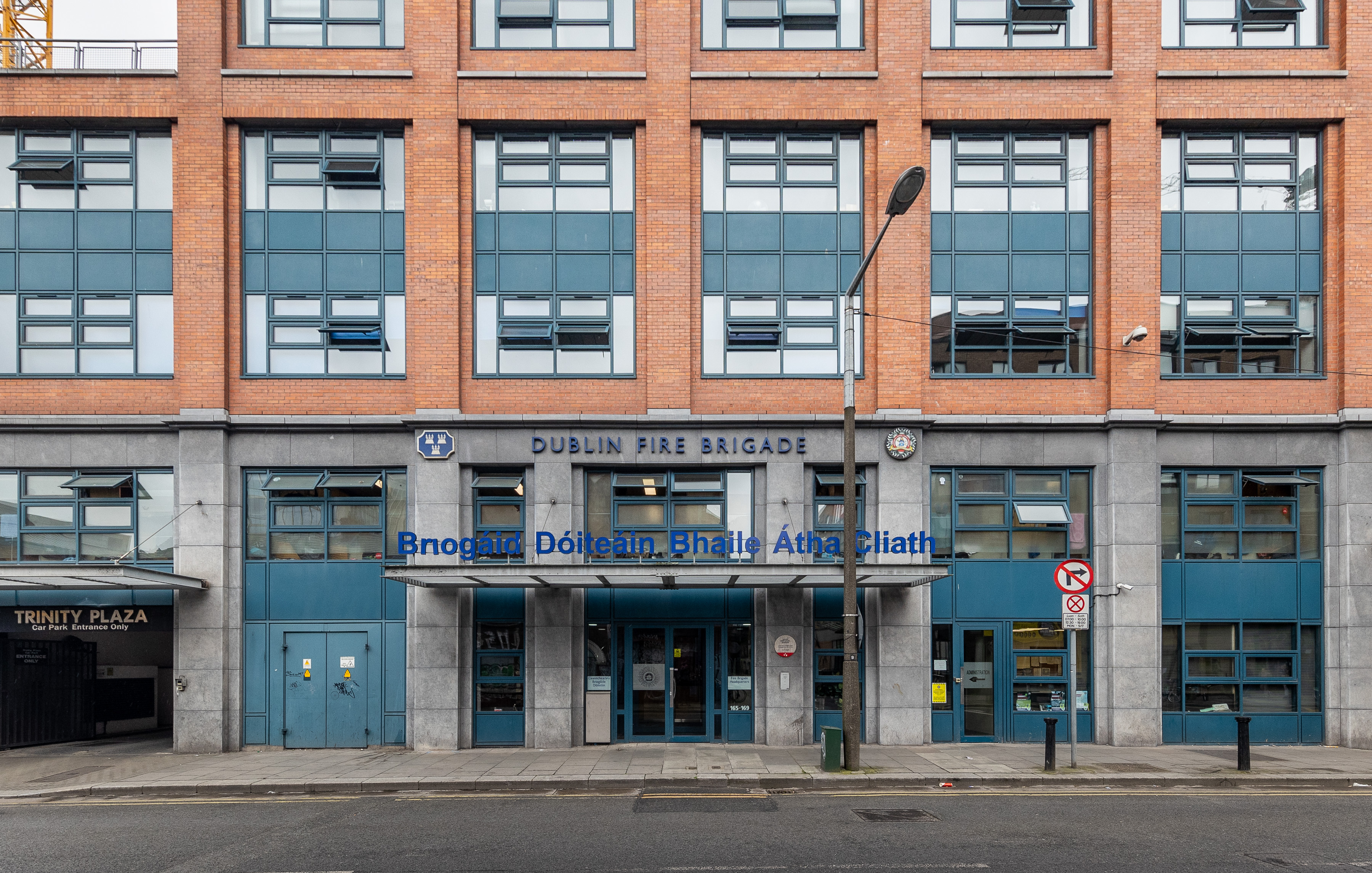
Dublin Fire Brigade headquarters on Townsend Street

Dublin Fire Brigade (DFB; Irish: Briogáid Dóiteáin Átha Cliath) is the fire and rescue service and ambulance service for County Dublin, including Dublin city, in Ireland. It is a local authority service, operated by Dublin City Council on behalf of that council and those of Fingal, Dún Laoghaire–Rathdown and South Dublin. There are currently 14 fire stations staffed by DFB, 12 of which are full-time, the other 2 are "retained" (they work on a pager system, with staff having between 5 and 7 minutes to attend the station in the event of a call) and operate on call 24/7 365 days a year with up to 500 calls per year. Full-time stations are staffed by shifts across 4 watches (A, B, C & D). There are currently over 963 active firefighter/paramedic personnel making it by far the largest fire service based on personnel and resources in the nation of Ireland.

== History ==
Dublin Corporation Fire Act 1862
- Act of Parliament
- Parliament of the United Kingdom
- Long title: An Act to extend and define the Powers of the Right Honourable the Lord Mayor, Aldermen, and Burgesses of Dublin in respect to the extinguishing of Fires, and the Protection of Life and Property against Fire; and for other Purposes.
- Citation: 25 & 26 Vict. c. xxxviii

Dates
- Royal assent: 3 June 1862

Dublin City's first two municipal fire engines were supplied in 1711 by John Oates, the city's water engineer and a manufacturer of water pumps. The Dublin Corporation paid Oates £6 to maintain the fire engines and a crew of six firefighters to attend any fire in the city. Throughout the second half of the 18th century, insurance brigades were the primary source of firefighting for the city, operating independently for buildings bearing the mark of their respective insurance companies. Eventually the brigades began to co-operate on a competition basis with the first brigade on scene being the highest paid.

It wasn't until 1862 with the enactment of the Dublin Corporation Fire Act 1862 (25 & 26 Vict. c. xxxviii), that the city had an organised fire brigade. Dublin man J.R. Ingram became the first superintendent of the brigade, having worked as a fireman in New York and London. The brigade consisted of 24 men with a makeshift fire brigade station on Winetavern Street in the Liberties. In 1898, the Dublin Fire Brigade Ambulance Service was established. The turn of the century saw the brigade have its first fire stations and permanent headquarters built, with the first motorised fire engine entering service on 13 December 1909.

In 1947, Edgar F. Keatinge, writing in the Dublin Historical Record, lamented about the passing of old Dublin, and horse-drawn services in the city:

"There is always a thrill about a Fire Brigade engine dashing by, but to my mind the modern motor-engine cannot compare with the galloping horses and the clanging bell of 50 years ago; and to watch the driver being firmly held by the belt by two of his comrades to prevent his being dragged from his seat by the straining horses, was a sight to be remembered".

=== Stardust fire ===
In the early hours of 14 February 1981, Dublin Fire Brigade received a call reporting a fire in the Stardust nightclub in Artane. Units were dispatched from both Kilbarrack fire station and North Strand fire station. When the firemen arrived they were met with scenes of panic, disorder and suffering at what would turn out be one of the worst fire disasters in the history of the state. 48 people died and 214 people were injured as a result of the fire.

== Fire stations ==
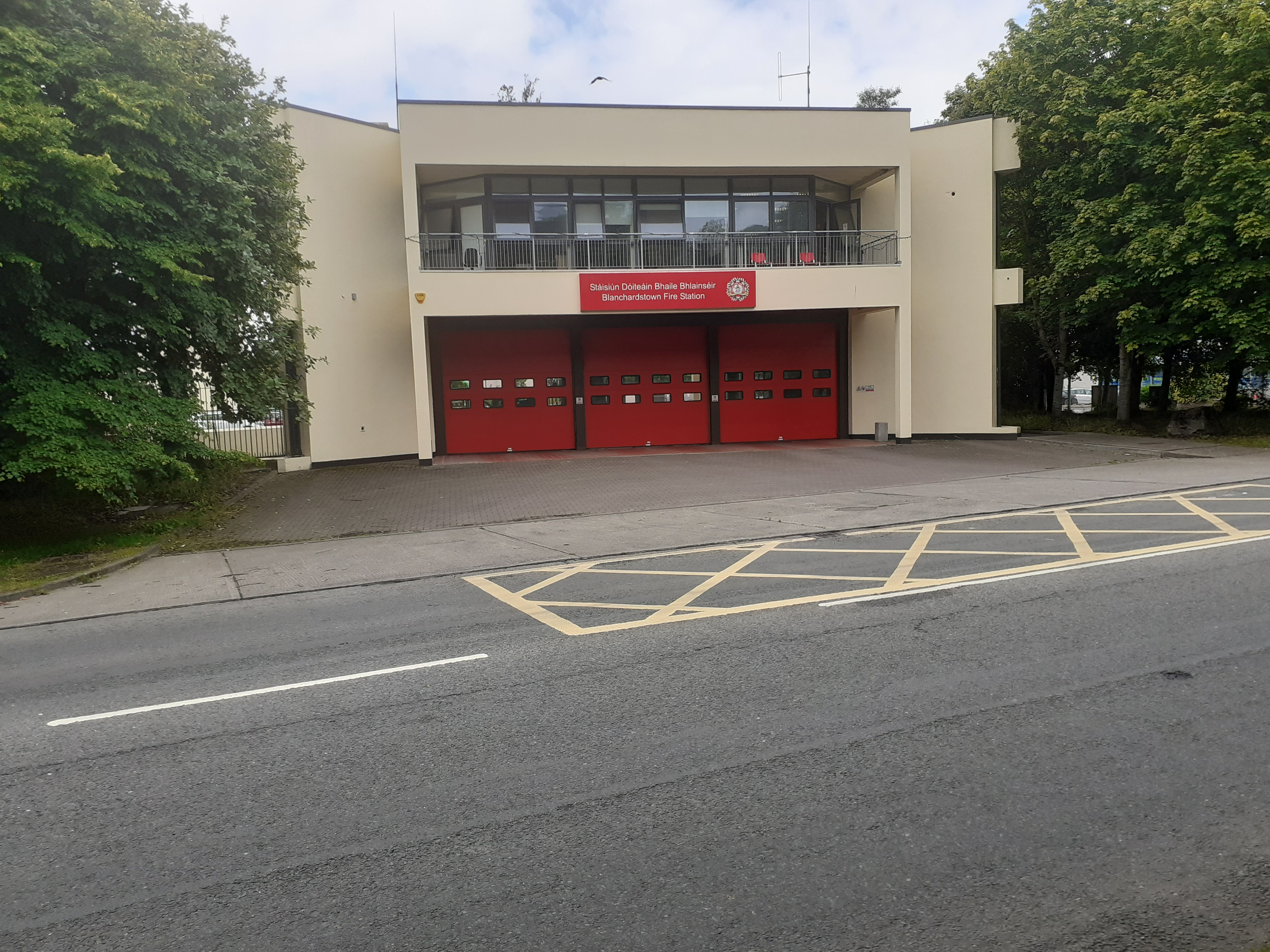
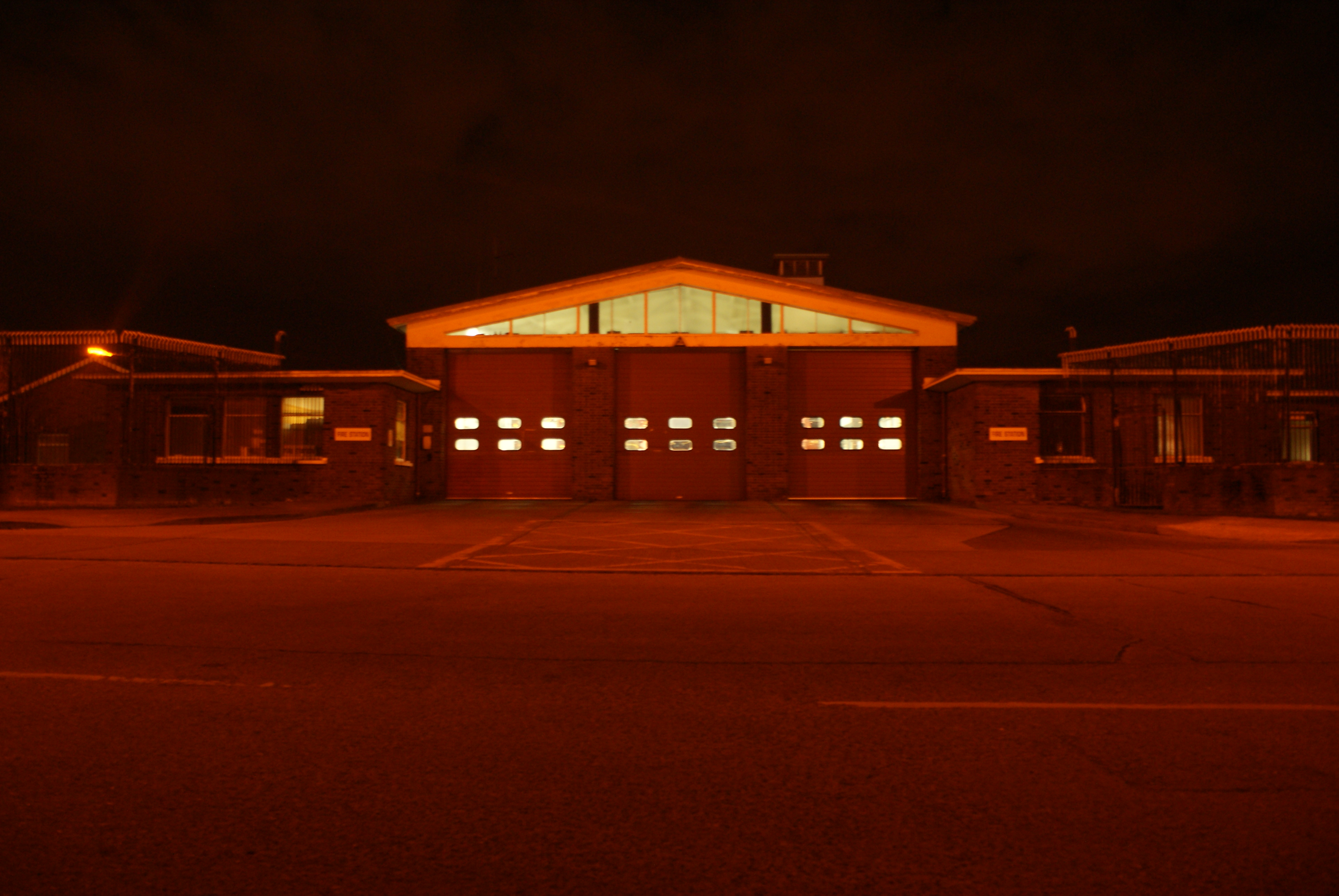
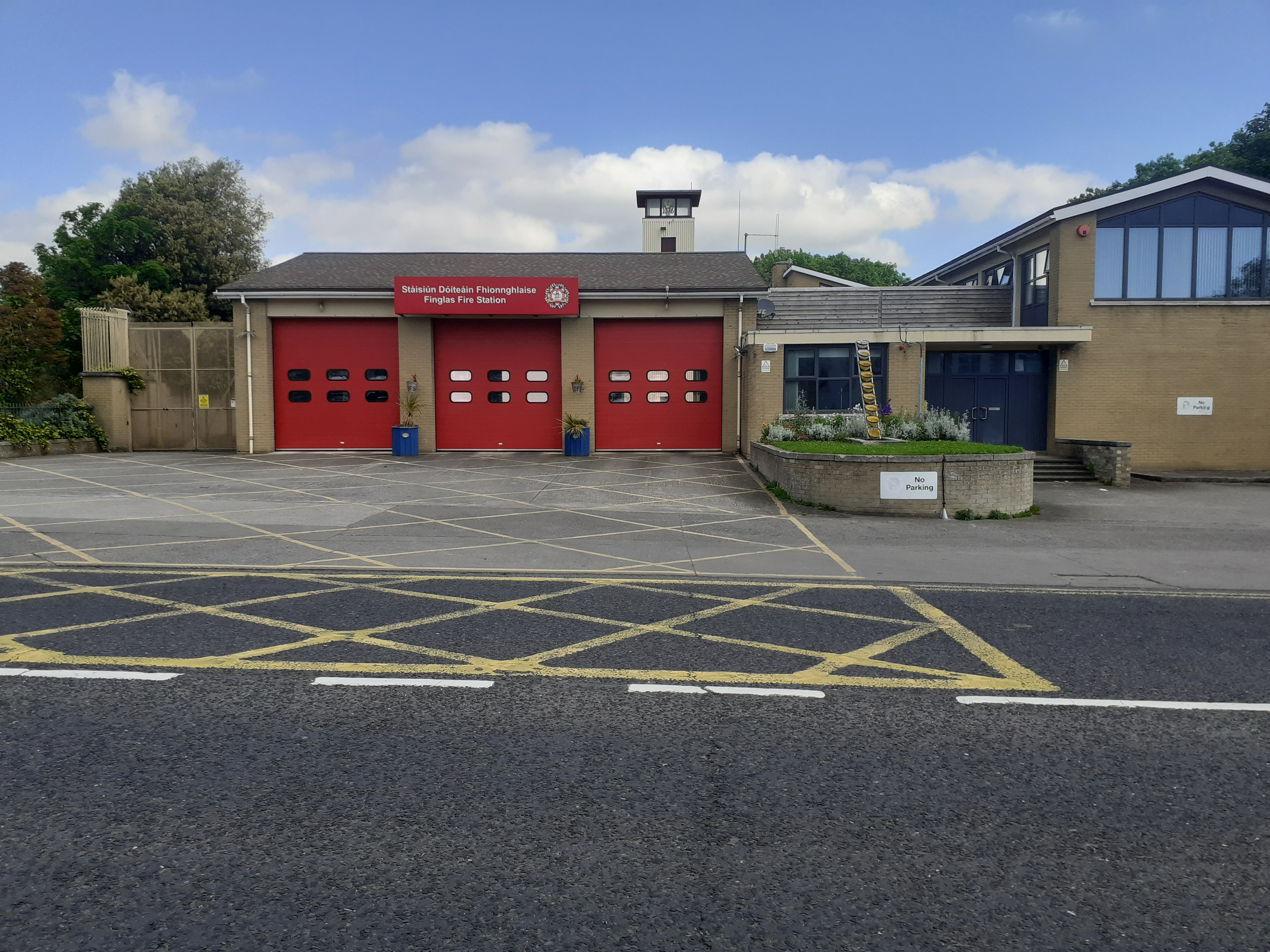
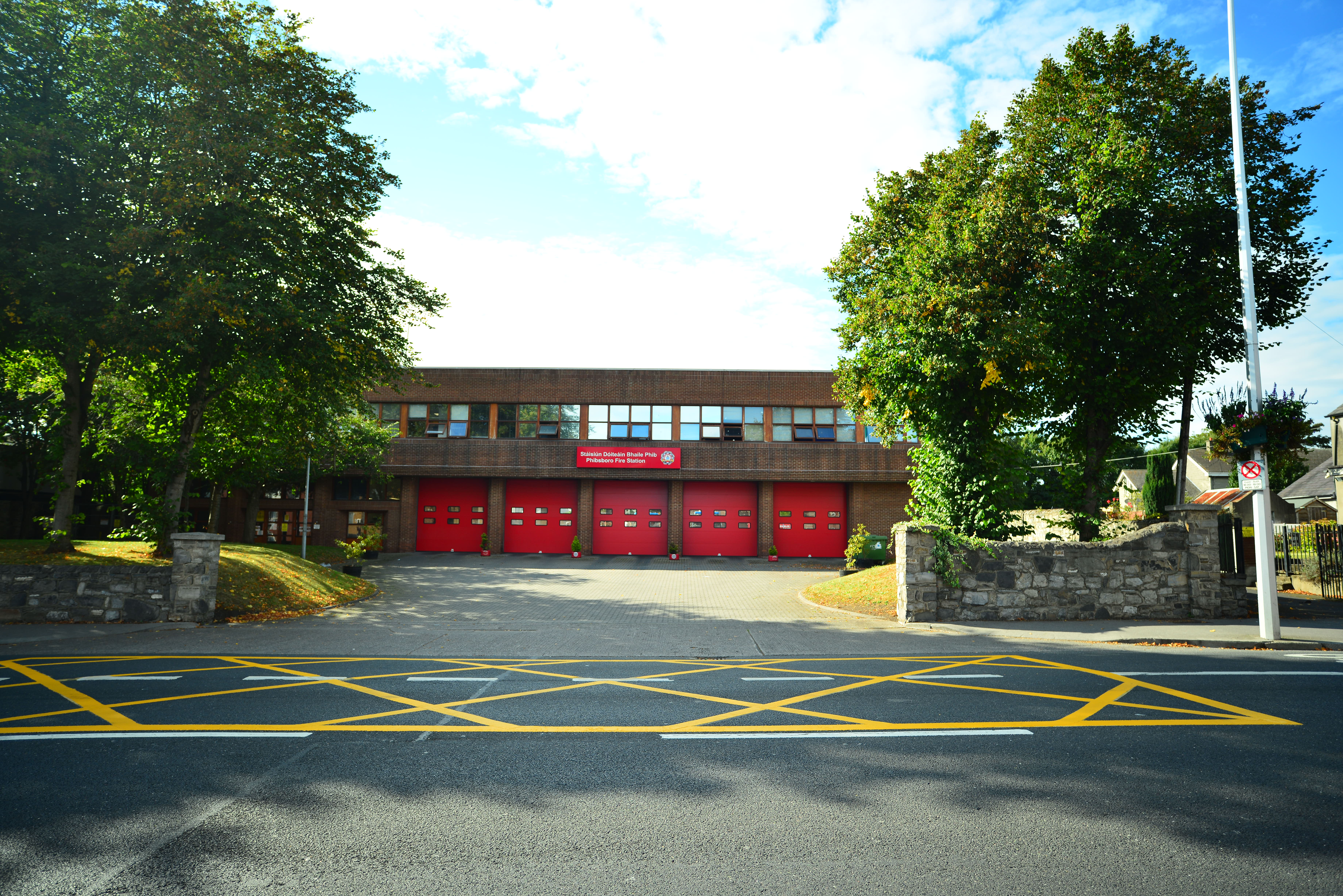
Clockwise from top left: Some of the brigade's fire stations in Blanchardstown, Dolphin's Barn, Phibsborough and Finglas

There are currently 14 fire stations staffed by DFB, 12 of which are full-time, the other 2 are part-time or "retained". There were formerly stations at Tara Street (now the adjacent Central Fire Station), Winetavern Street, Buckingham Street Lower, Thomas Street, Dorset Street Upper, Rathmines, Blackrock, and Dún Laoghaire - the latter three had been built by their respective councils before DFB started operating across the whole of Dublin County.

== Ambulance services ==
Dublin Fire Brigade Emergency Ambulance arriving at St. James's Hospital with a patient

Dublin Fire Brigade operates 14 ambulances on behalf of the Health Service Executive and 2 advanced paramedic response vehicles with staff rotating between fire and ambulance duties. Most firefighters are PHECC registered paramedics or advanced paramedics. Dublin Fire Brigade's fire and rescue resources are funded by and under the remit of Dublin City Council, and medical resources are funded by the HSE via service-level agreement from the National Ambulance Service annual budget.

== Training centre and museum ==
The Dublin Fire Brigade Training Centre at the O'Brien Institute

The Dublin Fire Brigade Training Centre is located at the O'Brien Institute on the Malahide Road, Marino, Dublin 3. Recruit firefighter training as well as Paramedic training and specialised courses are held here. The centre also provides various other training courses such as fire marshal training and first aid training to private companies and individuals. The Dublin Fire Brigade Museum, established in 1985, was opened in its current site at the O'Brien Institute in 2008 and can be visited by appointment.

== See also ==
- Cork City Fire Brigade
- Garda Síochána
- HSE National Ambulance Service
- List of fire departments
- Civil Defence Ireland
- Irish Coast Guard
