= Custume Barracks =

Irish military installation

- Dún Chostúim
- Athlone, Ireland
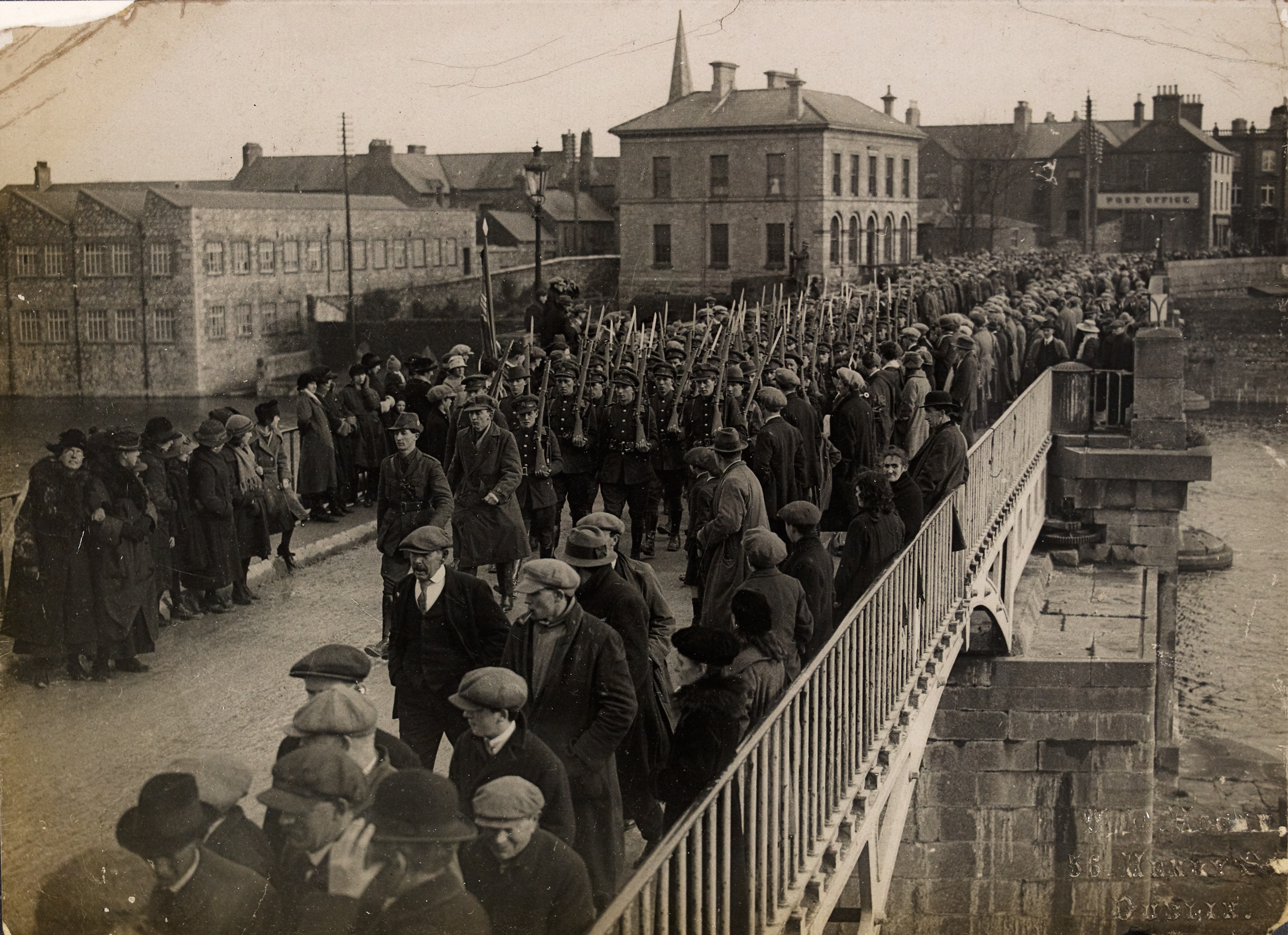
- Soldiers marching across the bridge in Athlone prior to the handover of Custume Barracks

Site information
- Type: Barracks
- Operator: (Republic of Ireland) Irish Army

Location
- Location within Ireland
- Coordinates: 53.42514°N 7.94649°W

Site history
- Built: 1691
- In use: 1691 – present

Garrison information
- Garrison: 6th Infantry Battalion, Irish Army

Custume Barracks (Irish: Dún Chostúim) is a military installation at Athlone in Ireland. Built in the 17th century and known as Victoria Barracks until 1922, the barracks are used as a garrison for an infantry battalion of the Irish Army.

== History ==
=== Barracks ===
The barracks were built originally as temporary accommodation for cavalry and infantry units in 1691. Athlone Barracks, named Victoria Barracks after Queen Victoria from 1837, was renamed Custume Barracks in 1922 after a Sergeant Custume, who defended the bridge from the forces of King William III during the 1690 Siege of Athlone. The barracks were taken over by forces of the Irish Free State in 1922 and served as the headquarters of 4th Western Brigade until the brigade was disbanded and is now part of 2 Brigade which is headquartered from Cathal Brugha Barracks in Dublin. The barracks remains the home of 6th Infantry Battalion as the lead unit, and 2nd Brigade Artillery Regiment and detachments of 2 Engineer Company and the Medical Corps.

=== Nuclear bunker ===
During the Cold War, there were contingency plans in place that, in the event of a nuclear exchange, cabinet ministers, senior civil servants and military advisers would use an underground nuclear bunker at Custume Barracks. The bunker was equipped with a command-and-control centre with communications equipment – which had a hotline to the British government in Whitehall – a map room pointing out important areas for protection, kitchen, bedroom and bathroom facilities to accommodate up to 100 persons.

In 1968, a larger nuclear bunker, housing the Integrated National Control Centre (INCC), was planned for Athlone. This was planned to have capacity to accommodate and feed up to 300 people for a month and allow the government to continue in the event of a nuclear emergency. The Department of Defence and the Office of Public Works (OPW) drew up secret plans for a larger 20,000 sq ft (1,900 m^{2}) underground bunker to include operations rooms, message centre, broadcasting studio, kitchens, offices, committee rooms, sleeping accommodation and 100,000 imperial gallons (450,000 L; 120,000 US gal) of uncontaminated drinking water. The plans for this new bunker never went ahead.

== See also ==
- List of Irish military installations
