= Ratra House =

Minor state residence in Ireland

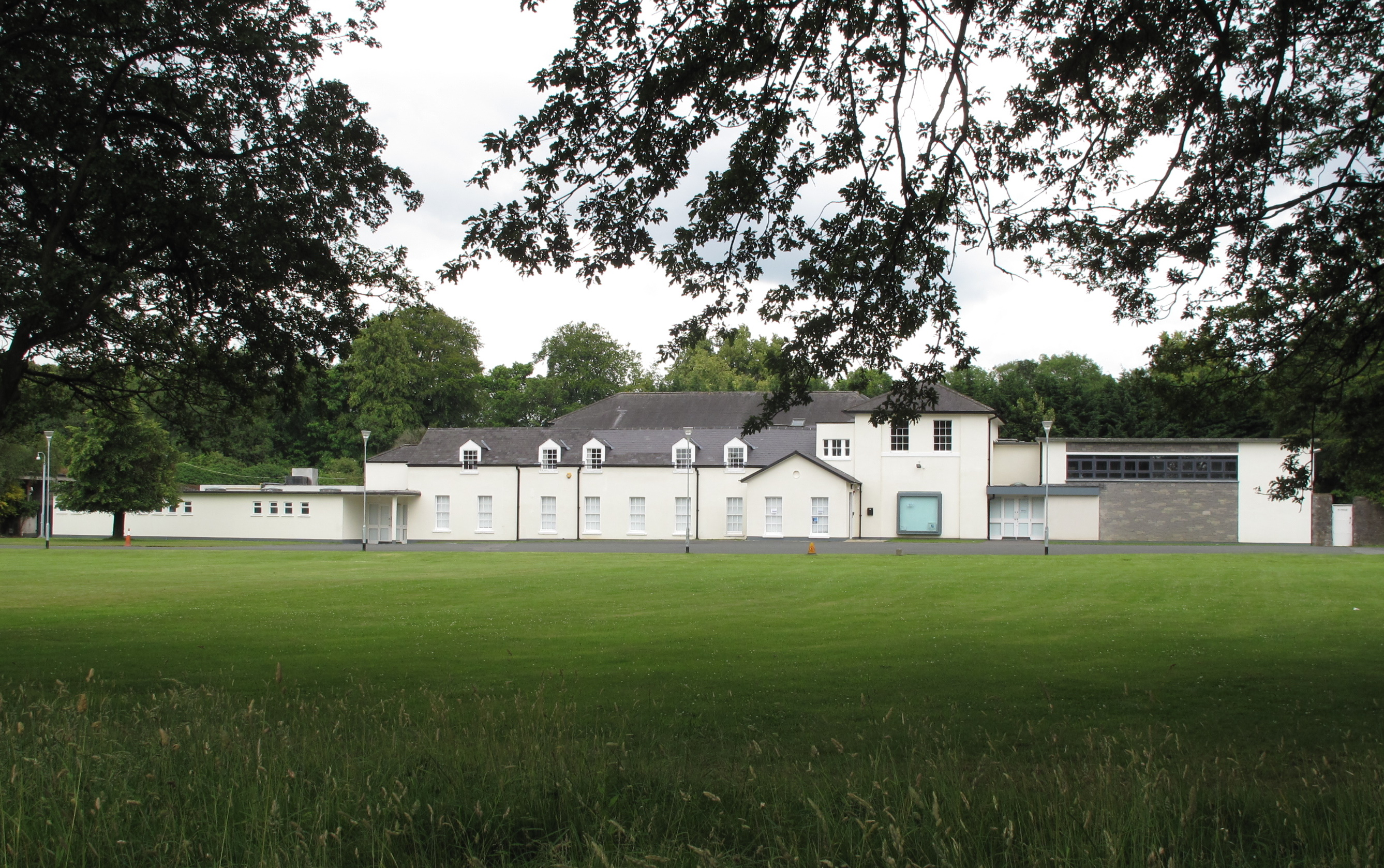
- Ratra House in Dublin's Phoenix Park

- Location within Dublin
- Alternative names: Little Lodge

General information
- Status: State residence
- Type: House
- Architectural style: Georgian
- Location: Dublin, Ireland
- Coordinates: 53.3642°N 6.3216°W
- Current tenants: Gaisce – The President's Award
- Estimated completion: c1800

Design and construction
- Known for: Former residence of the Private Secretary to the Lord Lieutenant of Ireland

Ratra House (Irish: Teach Ráth an tSratha), sometimes called Little Ratra, is one of the minor state residences located in the Phoenix Park in Dublin, Ireland.

== History ==
The building, which dates from the early 19th century, was originally known as the Little Lodge.

=== Residence of the Private Secretary to the Lord Lieutenant ===
From 1876, it became the official residence of the Private Secretary to the Lord Lieutenant of Ireland, who lived out of season in the next door Viceregal Lodge. Its first resident in this capacity was Lord Randolph Churchill, who was appointed as Private Secretary by the then Lord Lieutenant, his father John Spencer-Churchill, 7th Duke of Marlborough. Churchill lived there with his wife Lady Randolph Churchill and his young son Winston Churchill. Winston Churchill in his writings described his four years, from the ages of two to six, spent in the Little Lodge as among the happiest of his life. It was claimed that he developed his interest in the military from watching military parades at the Lodge.

=== Offices of the Governor General of the Irish Free State ===
Following Irish independence in 1922 the house was used for some years by staff of the Governor-General of the Irish Free State before becoming the official residence of Adjutant General of the Irish Army, Major General Brennan between 1926 and 1940.

=== Residence of Douglas Hyde ===
In 1945, the wheelchair-using retiring first President of Ireland, Douglas Hyde, was judged too ill to return to his Roscommon country house, Ratra. It was decided instead to move him into the vacant residence in the grounds of the Lodge (then renamed Áras an Uachtaráin). Hyde named the residence Little Ratra in honour of his old home. He died there in 1949.

=== Irish Civil Defence offices ===
On 18 June 1951 it became the headquarters of the newly formed Irish Civil Defence and renamed Ratra House. The Irish Civil Defence School was relocated to Roscrea, County Tipperary in 2006, but Ratra House remains in use as an administrative building. Parts of the complex are still used by the Civil Defence, such as the purpose-built training range used by firemen and rescue personnel.

=== Gaisce - The President's Award ===
Today, Ratra House is the headquarters of Gaisce – The President's Award.
