= Civil Defence Ireland =

Irish national civil defence organisation

- Cosaint Shibhialta na hÉireann
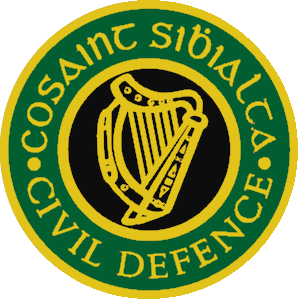

Agency overview
- Formed: 1951 (75 years ago)
- Jurisdiction: Ireland
- Headquarters: Benamore Roscrea, County Tipperary, Ireland; 52°57′30.9″N 7°46′38.6″W
- Employees: 60 Employees(approx.); 3500 Volunteer Members
- Minister responsible: Helen McEntee, TD, Minister for Defence
- Parent department: Department for Defence & Local Authorities
- Website: civildefence.ie

Civil Defence Ireland (Irish: Cosaint Shibhialta na hÉireann) is the national civil defence organisation of Ireland. It is a statutory agency of the Irish Department of Defence and is administered by local authorities. It was established in 1951 in response to the threat of nuclear disaster posed by the atomic bomb following World War II. Today it is an emergency response and rescue agency whose purpose is to provide aid, assistance and relief in times of emergency or natural disaster. It may also support primary emergency response agencies namely the Garda Síochána, HSE National Ambulance Service, and local authority fire services when requested. Civil Defence Ireland consists almost entirely of volunteers, numbering 2500 as of May 2023.

== History ==
The international distinctive sign of civil defence, defined by the rules of International Humanitarian Law and to be used as a protective sign.

Civil Defence Ireland was established in 1951 in response to the threat of nuclear disaster posed by the atomic bomb. It was envisaged as a community based self-help organisation that could provide protection for the civilian population during times of war. One of its first notable roles following its foundation was to assist refugees fleeing violence in Northern Ireland as a result of The Troubles. This involved providing accommodation and welfare services on both a local and national level. In addition Civil Defence Ireland provided support during major emergencies such as the 1965 North Wall Depot fire and the 1981 Stardust fire.

In the mid-1970s the main focus of the organisation started to shift with the establishment of a warden service. Volunteers were equipped and trained to monitor radiation levels that may occur in the event of a nuclear disaster. Following the Chernobyl Disaster in 1986, civil defence volunteers provided valuable monitoring to assess the consequences of the disaster on Ireland.

By the start of the 1990s, with the threat of nuclear war and conflict receding, the organisation again began to change focus. A greater emphasis has since been placed on the role of civil defence to provide support within their communities in particular during major events and emergencies. During the 2000s and 2010s civil defence played a major role in assisting during severe weather events such as storms and flooding.

== Role ==
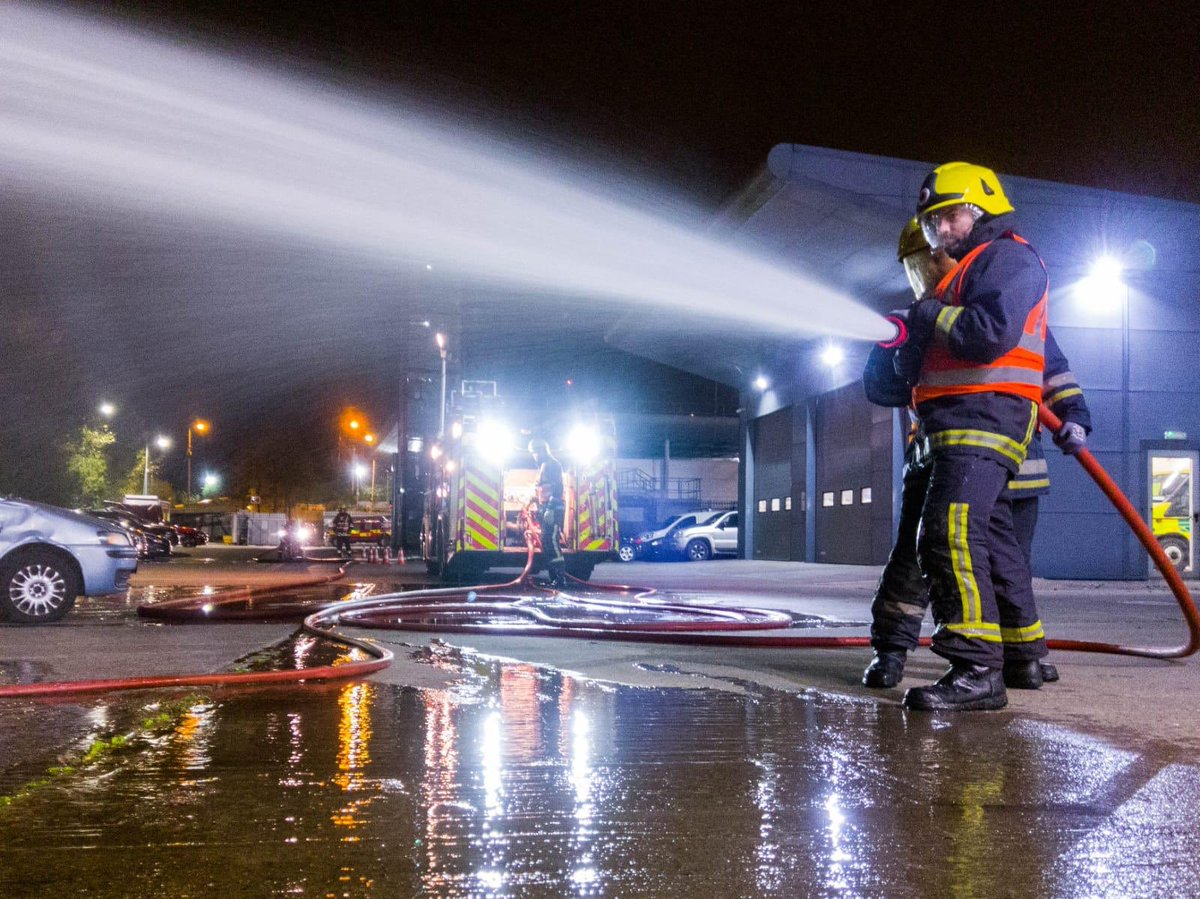
Cork City Civil Defence Auxiliary Fire Service during a training exercise

Civil Defence volunteers are trained to provide a number of different services to their communities. Services can vary by location, with not all units providing all these roles. Areas with a larger number of volunteers such as Dublin and Cork may have dedicated structures with volunteers being trained specifically for one service (AFS/Casualty/Rescue, etc.). Units with a smaller number of volunteers generally operate as a single location based unit with many multidisciplinary volunteers. The following five different services are provided by Civil Defence Ireland.

Auxiliary Fire Service

The primary role of this service is to provide assistance to the local authority fire service when requested. Volunteers are trained in basic firefighting and water pumping. Generally this service is involved in providing flood relief by pumping water from affected areas.

Rescue Service

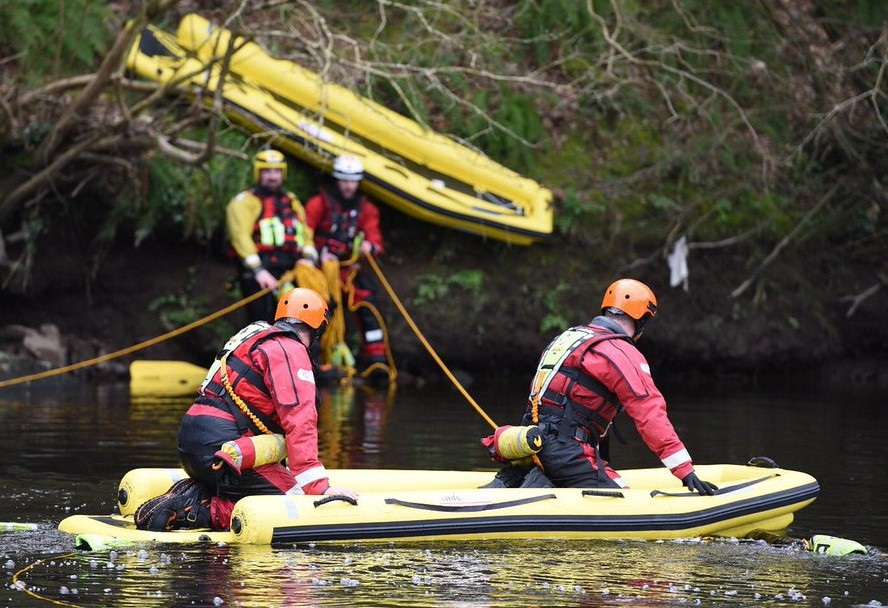
Cork City Civil Defence during a swift-water training exercise

The primary role of this service is to provide search and rescue/recovery services for missing persons in a wide range of scenarios. Volunteers are trained to provide a range of capabilities from basic search to, urban search and rescue, swift water rescue, and High-line/technical rescue. In addition some units are equipped with watercraft such as jetskis, dinghy, and RHIBs etc.

Casualty/Ambulance Service:

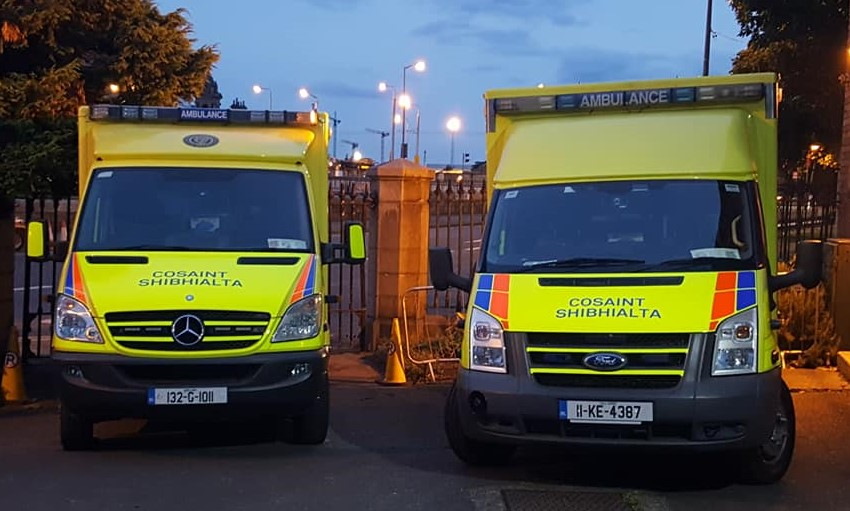
Civil Defence Ambulances during the visit of Pope Francis to Dublin

The role of this service is to provide additional medical and ambulance cover in the event of a major emergency. In addition, Civil Defence also provides ambulance and medical cover for events within their community. Volunteers are certified by the PHECC from Community First Responder level through to Emergency Medical Technician. A number of units also have members who are professional Paramedics, Advanced Paramedics, Nurses and Doctors who can practice at their respective levels while volunteering.

Welfare Service

The purpose of the welfare service is to provide care, comfort and shelter to members of the community during major emergencies. Volunteers may provide shelters and catering services to displaced people. During the Winter months, the welfare service provides a homeless shelter in Dublin at their base, staffed with volunteers from across Ireland.

Warden Service

The warden service is responsible for the provision of communications within the unit, it provides UHF, VHF, Marine radio and TETRA radio capabilities. In addition, the service also provides radiological monitoring.

== Organisation Structure ==
=== National Level ===
The Civil Defence Branch of the Irish Department of Defence is headquartered in Roscrea, County Tipperary, and is charged with the management and development of Civil Defence at a national level. The headquarters provides national policy direction and planning for the organisation, the procurement of major items of uniform and equipment at a national level, and is responsible for the provision of training through the Civil Defence College.

Civil Defence College

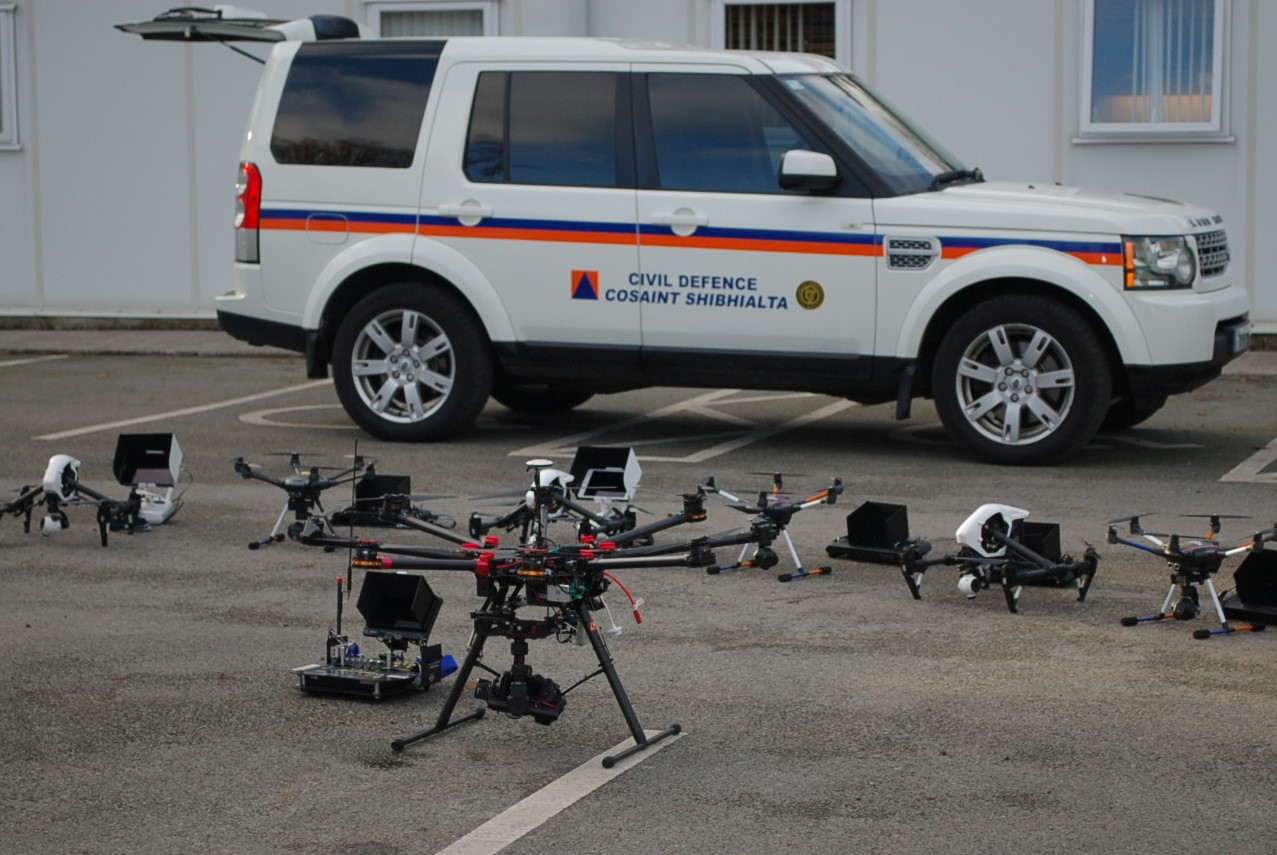
Civil Defence UAV's on display at a joint training exercise

The Civil Defence College was initially based at Ratra House in Dublin's Phoenix Park before relocating to Roscrea in 2006. The college serves to provide potential instructors with a level of education that will allow them to teach classes of volunteers to be competent in their service's skills. Courses include AFS Instructor, Radio Communications Operator/Instructor, Emergency First Responder and Emergency Medical Technician. The college is approved by the Pre-hospital Emergency Care Council (PHECC) to train members to practitioner (EMT) level and is approved to implement the Clinical Practice Guidelines (CPGs) set down by PHECC.

Civil Defence also operates a national training centre located to the rear of Ratra House in Dublin. The facility features an outdoor training range built originally to resemble a bombed out street, it features a number of different sites that can be used to train volunteers in specialist skills. The training centre also includes lecture rooms, and accommodation for up to 25 people.

=== Local Level ===
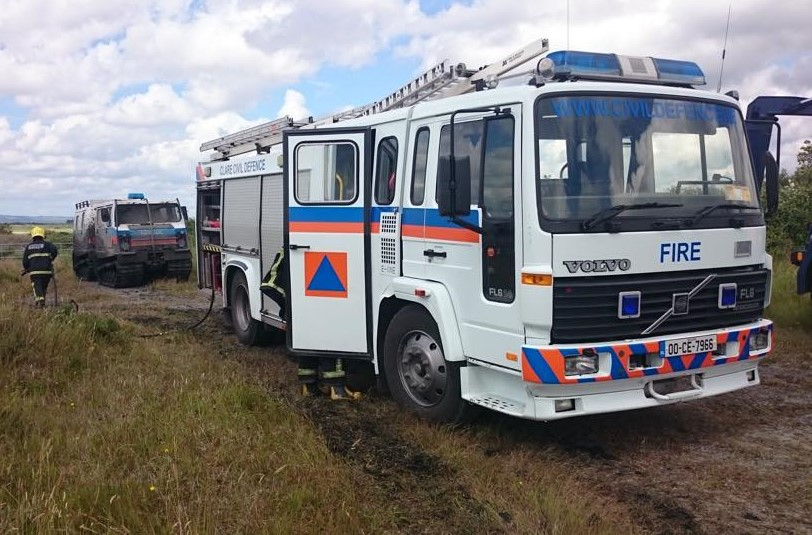
Dublin Civil Defence Auxiliary Fire Service

The majority of the work of Civil Defence occurs at the local authority level. Funding of the organisation is shared on a 70/30 basis between the Department of Defence and the local authority, with the day-to-day operations administered by a local authority appointed Civil Defence Officers (CDO) and Assistant Civil Defence Officers (ACDO). With the exception of these appointed personnel, almost all other members are volunteers. The CDO may appoint volunteer officers and instructors who assist in the administration and training within the unit. Volunteer members make themselves available to attend training throughout the year and may participate in local and national exercises to test their skills. Volunteers are also expected to participate in duties in their local community often providing services at sporting, music and cultural events. In the event of a request by a civil power, a Civil Defence Officer may activate volunteers, who will assist the primary response agencies.

== Rank structure ==
Civil Defence Ireland is organised along a standardised rank and command structure originally based on the ranks of the Irish Defence Forces.

The volunteer ranks and their insignia are based on and resemble the pre-1950 ranks of the Irish Army with civilian titles used in place of martial ones. The red bars of the non-officer ranks of Assistant Leader and Leader correspond to Corporal and Sergeant respectively. The gold bars/pips of the officer ranks of 3rd, 2nd, 1st Officer and Commander correspond to the ranks of 2nd and 1st Lieutenant, Captain, and Commandant (Major) respectively. Originally there were no markings for regular volunteers, with a blank rank slider being worn, however, in recent years a blue bar was introduced for volunteer members.

Civil Defence Officers and Assistant Civil Defence Officers are paid employees and are appointed by their respective local authority. At the discretion of the Civil Defence Officer, volunteer officers and leaders are appointed to assist in the command and administration of the unit.

=== Rank Insignia ===
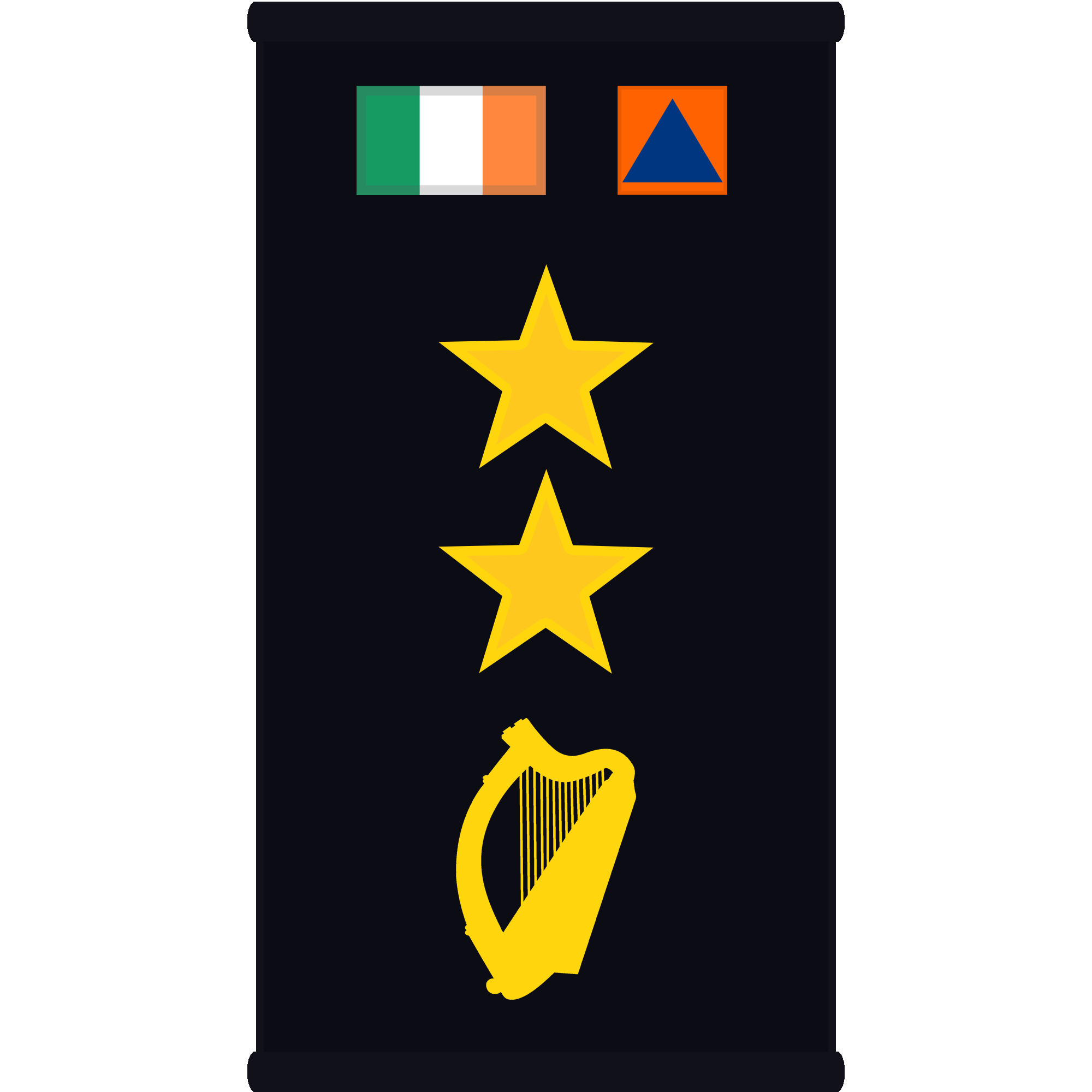
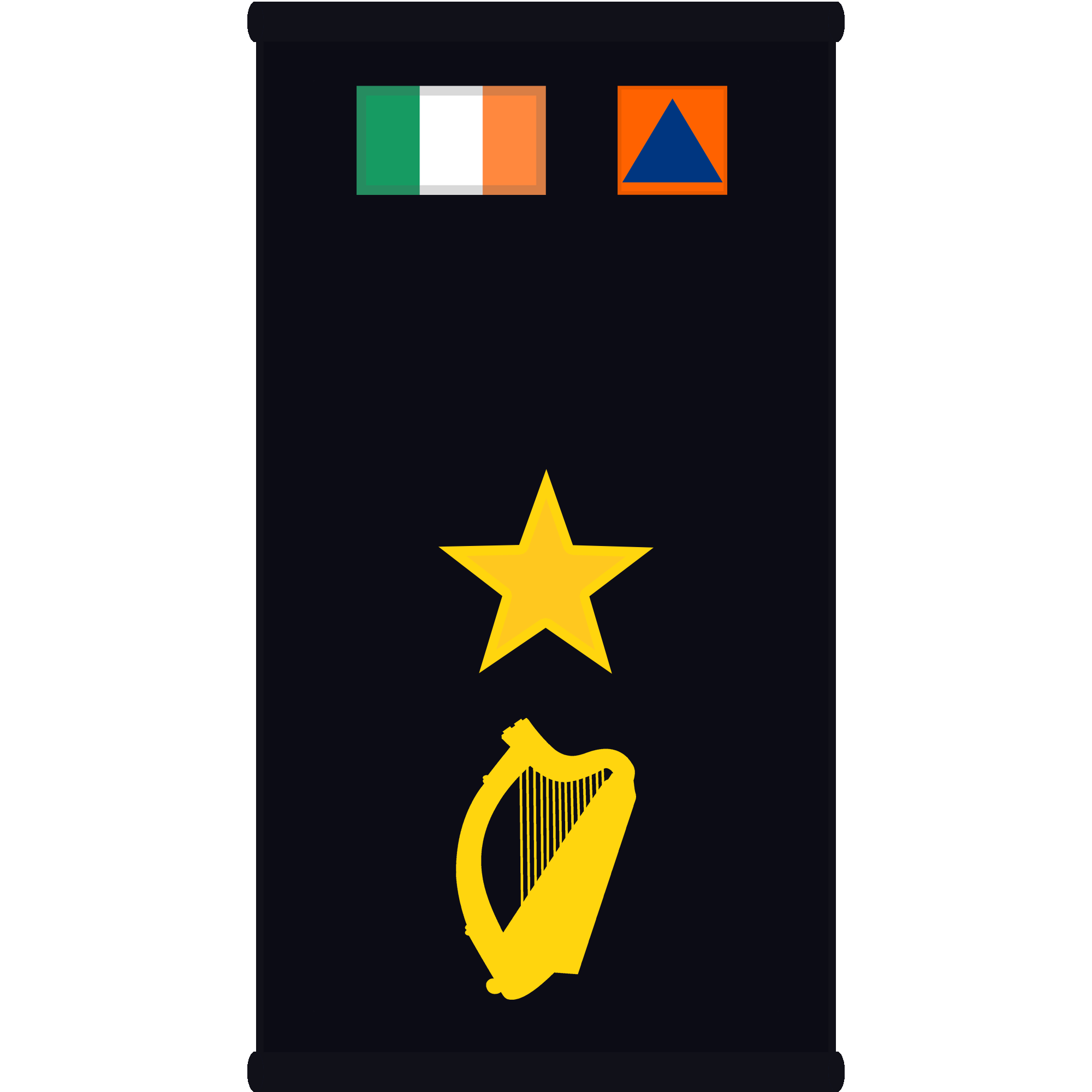
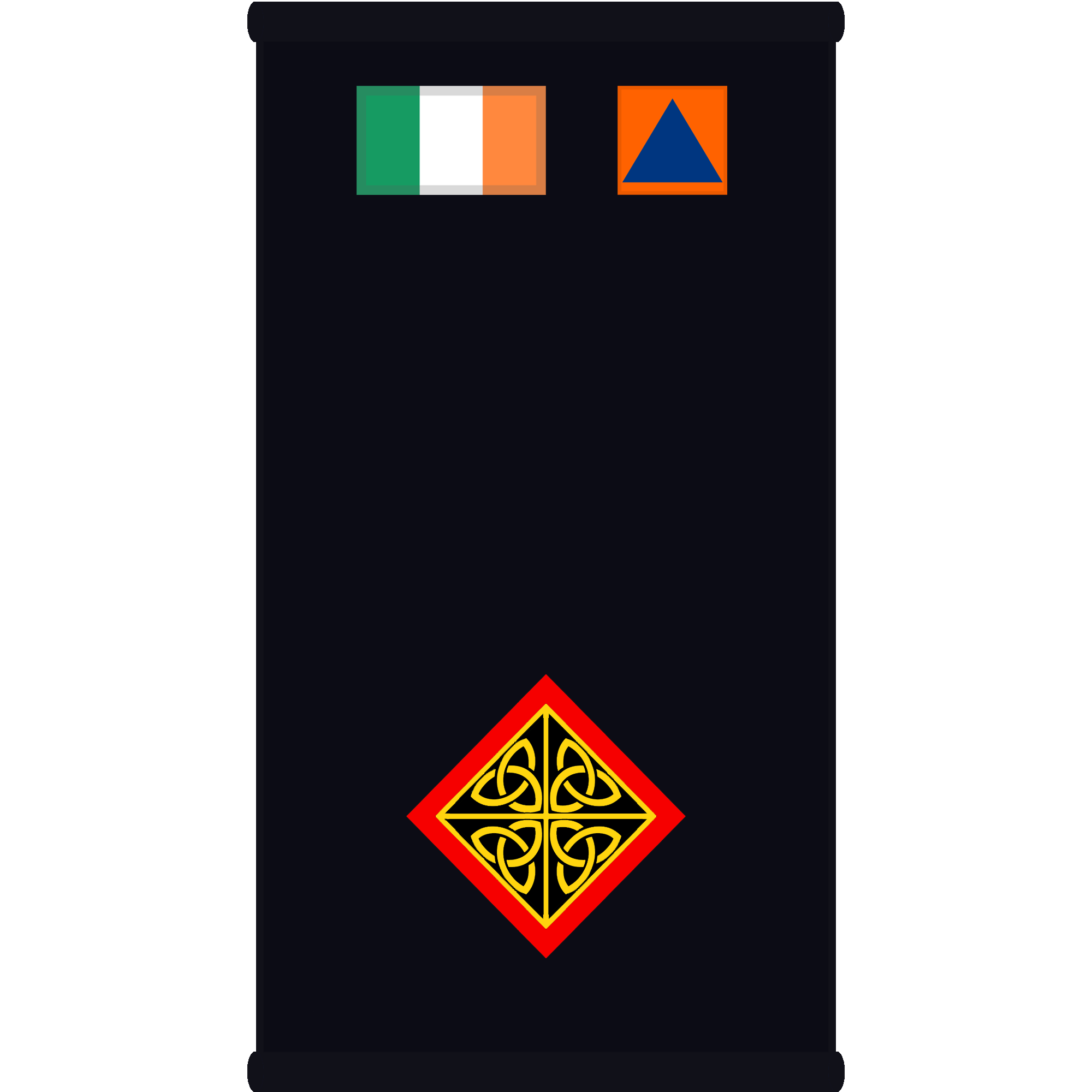
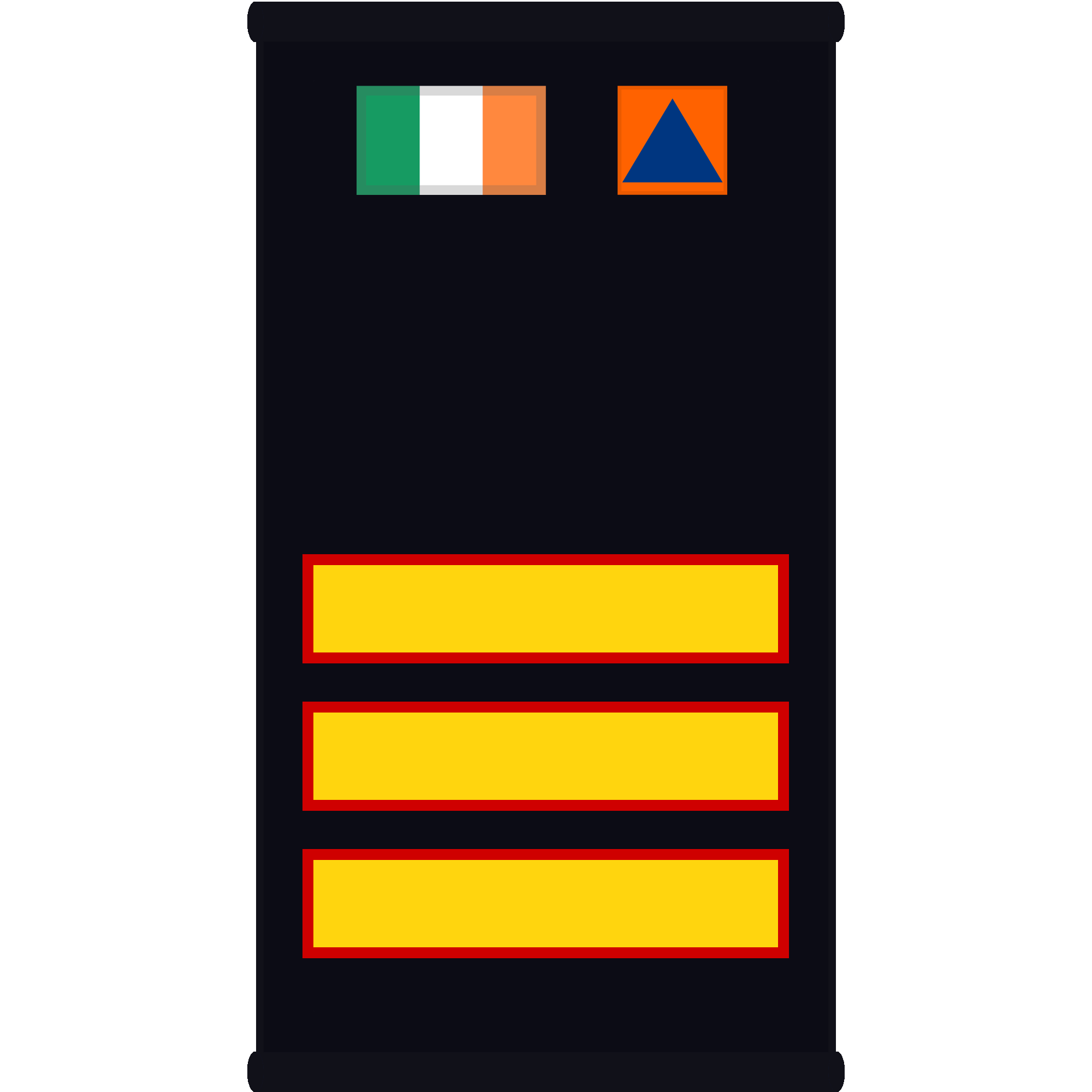
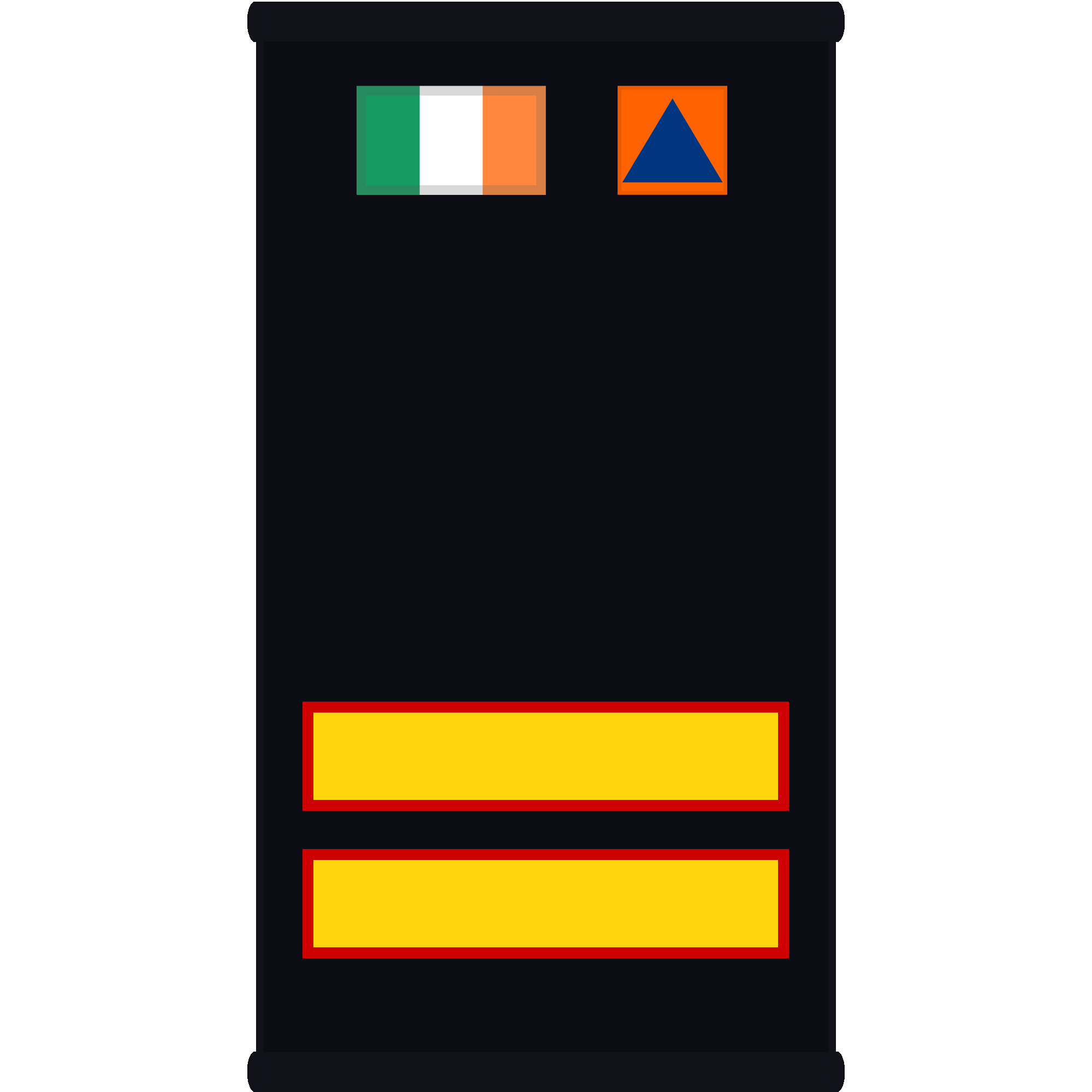
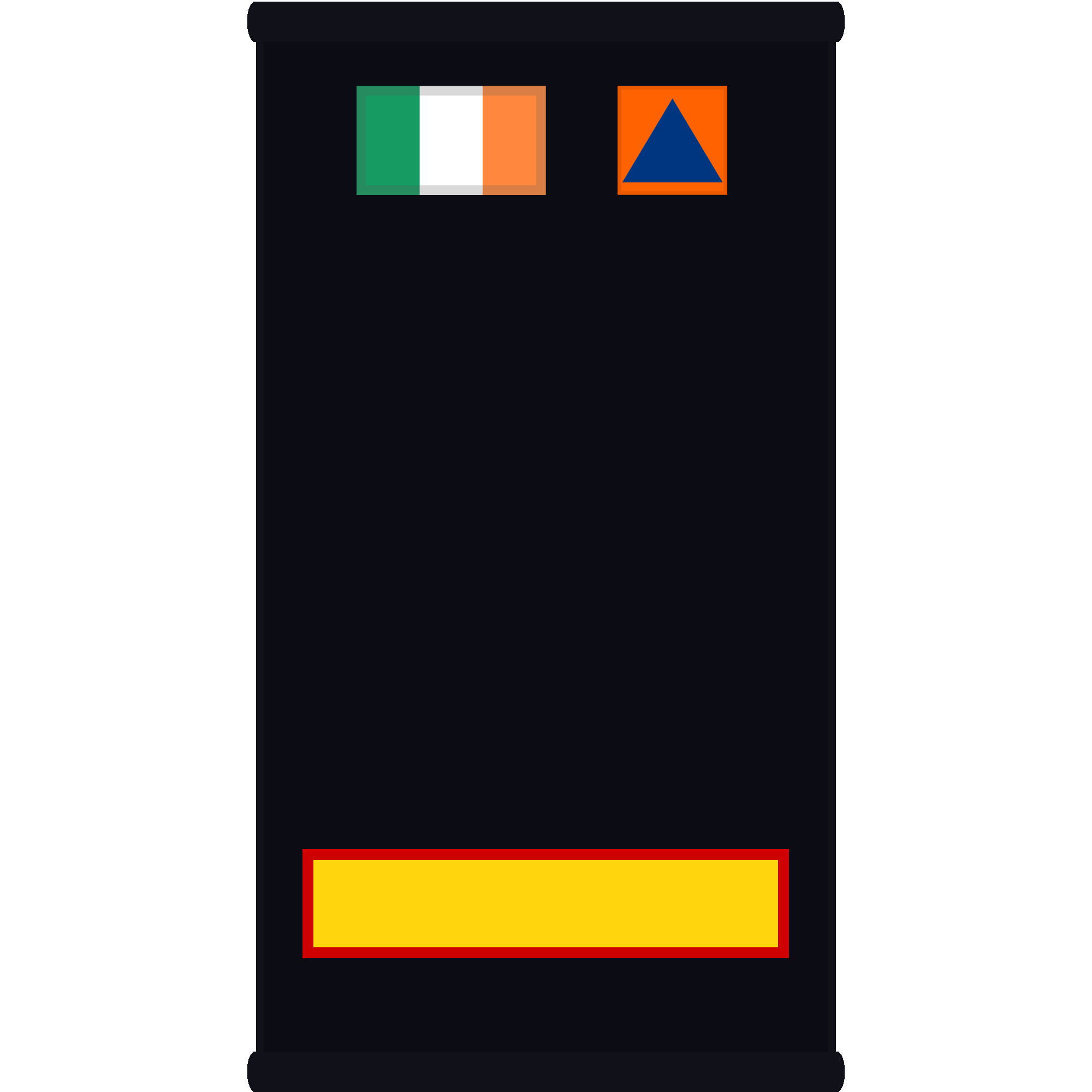
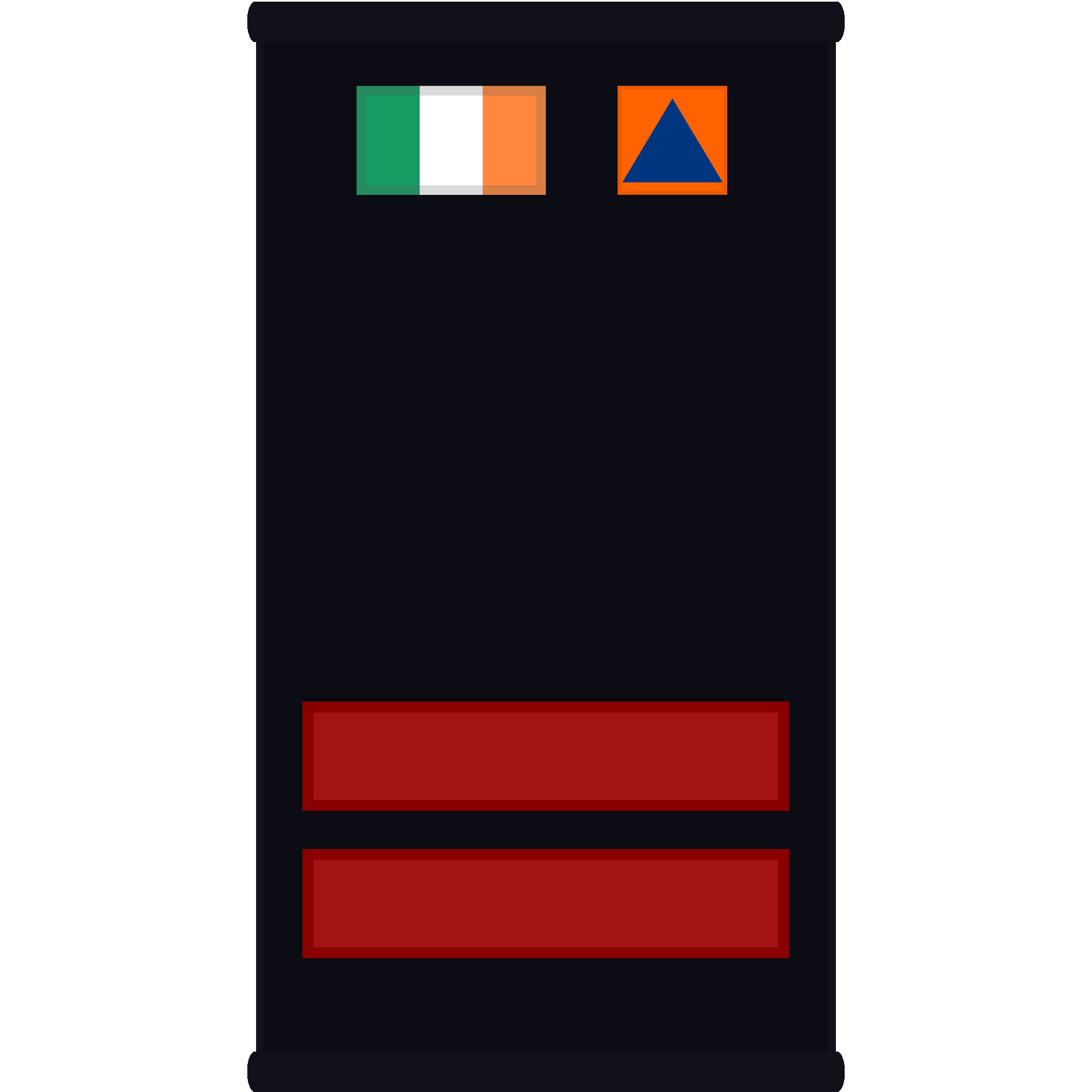
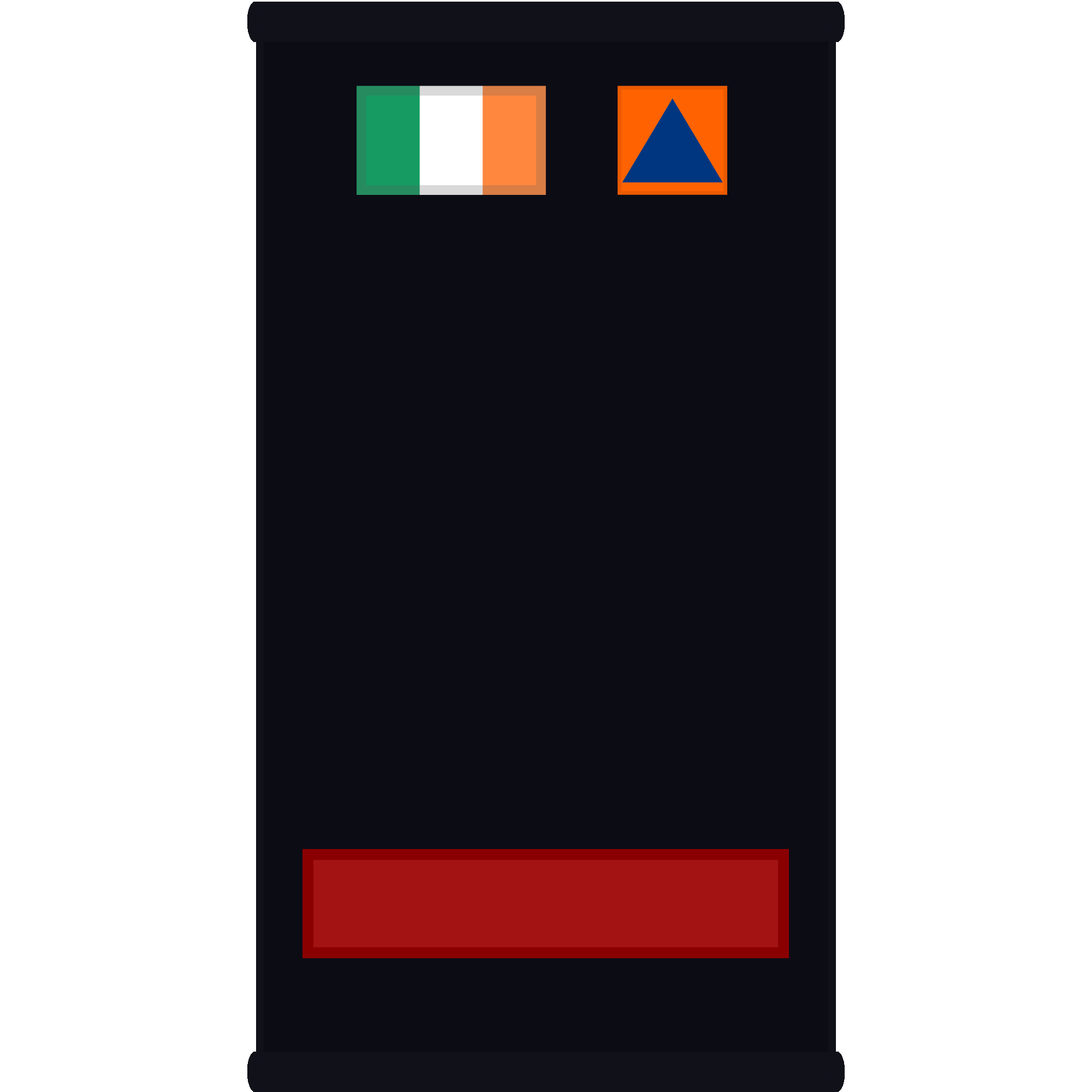
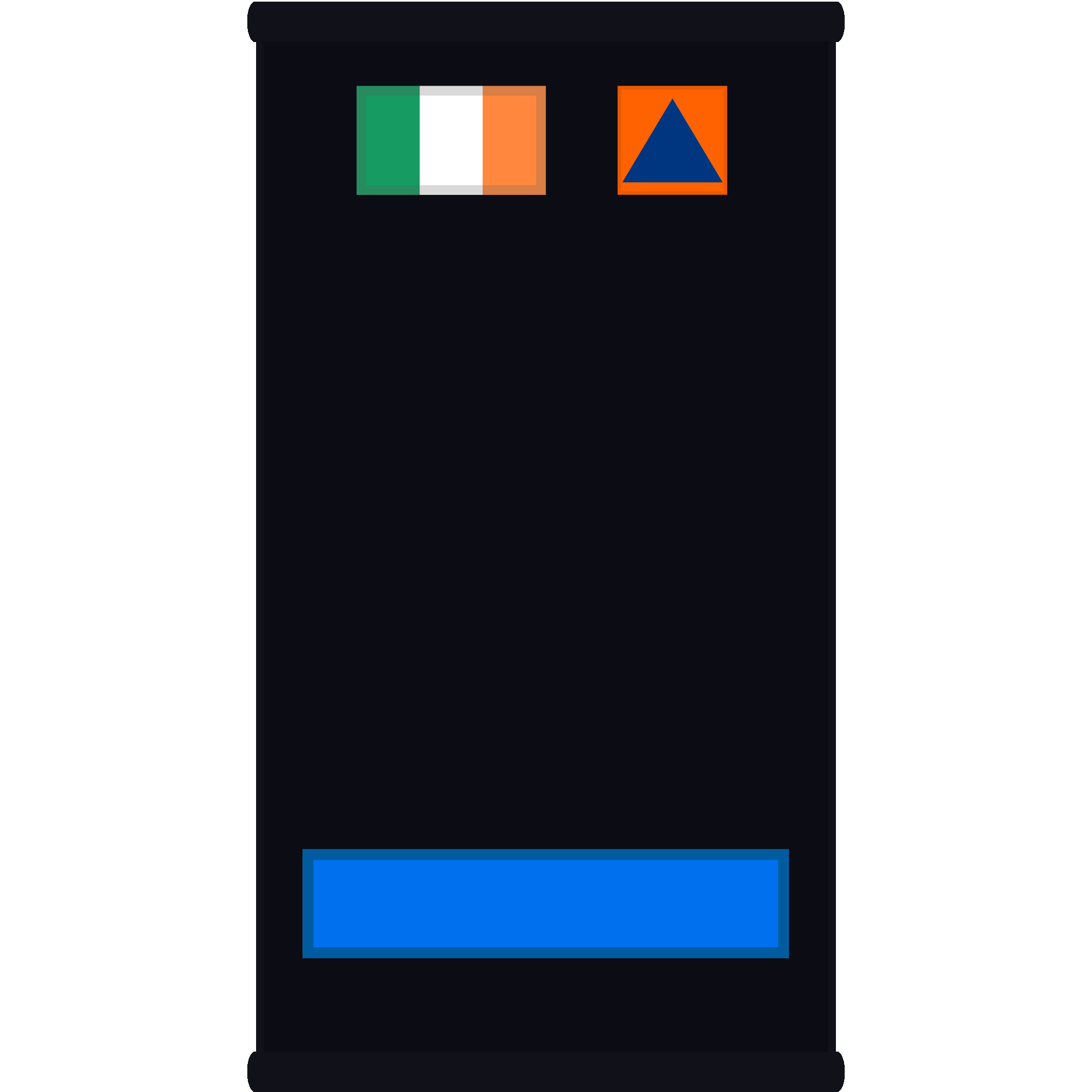
Rank	Civil; Defence Officer	Assistant Civil; Defence Officer	Commander	First Officer	Second Officer	Third Officer	Leader	Assistant Leader	Volunteer
(Republic of Ireland); Ireland
Irish language equivalent	Oifigeach; Cosanta Sibhialta	Leas-Oifigeach; Cosanta Sibhialta	Ceannasaí	Céad Oifigeach	Dara Oifigeach	Tríú Oifigeach	Ceannaire	Leas-Cheannaire	Saorálaí
Abbreviation	CDO	ACDO	Cmdr	1/O	2/O	3/O	Ldr	Asst Ldr	Vol

== Vehicles ==
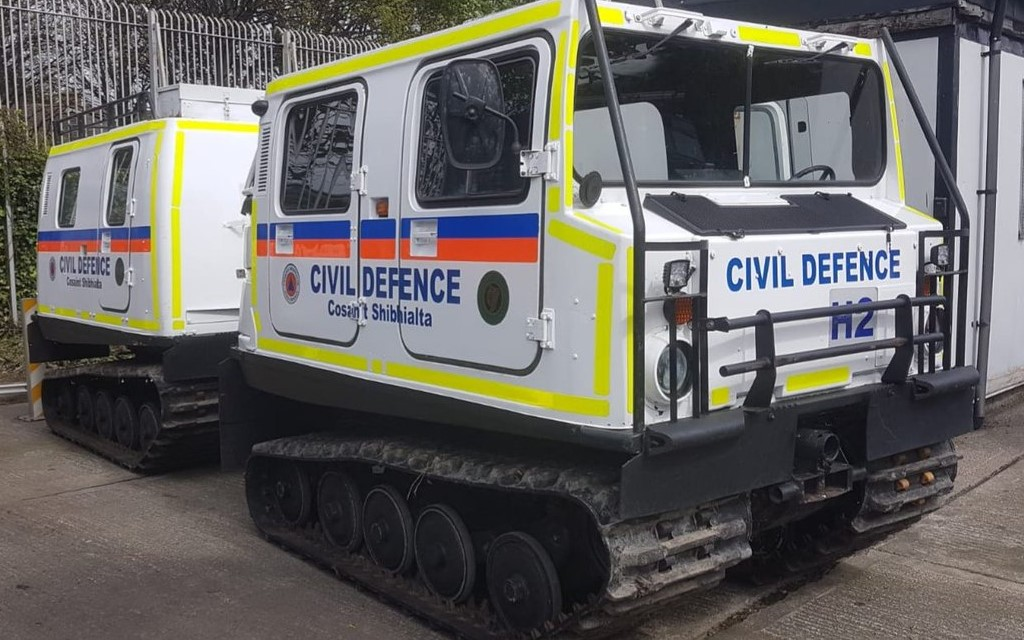
Dublin Civil Defence Bandvagn 206

The organisation uses many different types of vehicles often varying by unit. Some vehicles are purpose-built and some have been adapted into new roles such as mobile incident command units. Many of the vehicles have all-terrain capabilities such as Land Rover Defender/Mercedes G Class field ambulances, Bedford and Iveco four-wheel drive lorries and Hägglund & Söner Bandvagn 206 personnel carriers. Standard vehicles such as emergency ambulances, support units and class B fire appliances are also available for use by their respective services. Vehicle livery is generally non-standardised orange and blue with white paintwork with high visibility markings on the rear of the vehicles. The Water Rescue Unit have a fleet of inshore patrol vessels and rigid-hulled inflatable boats.

== Uniforms ==
Civil defence volunteers and officers wear two main standard configurations of uniforms within the organisation, namely the Service Dress No. 1 and the Workwear No. 2 Uniform. All volunteers are issued with the standard Workwear No. 2 Uniform which consists of:

- Boots
- Baseball cap
- Hi-viz vests
- Navy combat trousers
- Navy open necked shirt
- Navy waterproof trousers
- Orange and navy waterproof jackets
- Soft shell long sleeved jackets
- White Wicking T-shirt

National guidelines clearly outline rules for the wear of the uniform such as "Badges/Decorations or any other items CANNOT be worn or attached to any item of the Workwear Uniform i.e. shirt, t-shirt, waterproof jacket, soft shell jacket."

The No.1 Dress Uniform, is worn at certain occasions under the direction of the local Civil Defence Officer. The No. 1 Dress Uniform consists of a navy tunic, navy trousers/skirt, white long sleeve shirt, navy clip-on tie, white lanyard, black footwear and black beret (officers wear a peaked cap in place of the beret). During particular occasions (such as a guard of honour) the uniform will be supplemented with additional components such as White Gloves, White Belt, etc. as directed by the Civil Defence Officer. Due to budgetary restrictions in recent years, volunteers are only to be issued a No.1 dress uniform when the need arises.

While all members wear the workwear uniform while on duty, specialist personnel may be issued with personal protection equipment for their role. For example, Auxiliary Fire Service personnel are issued with firefighting jackets/trousers, gloves, fire boots and firefighter's helmets. Medical Personnel are issued with orange tactical vests. Members of the rescue service wear helmets. Trained Water Rescue personnel are issued with drysuits, water rescue helmets and Personal flotation devices (PFDs).

== Notable emergency calls ==
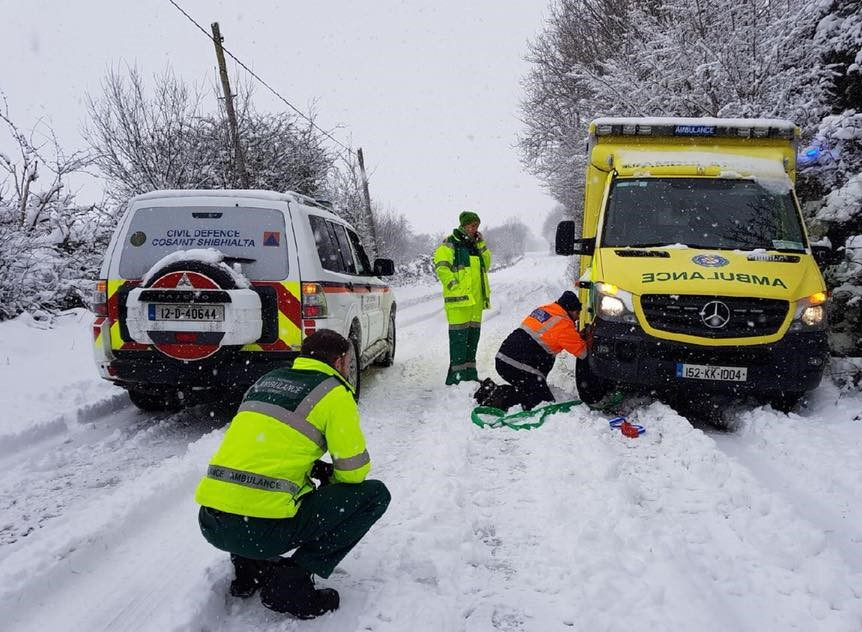
Cork South Civil Defence assist the National Ambulance Service during Storm Emma (2018)

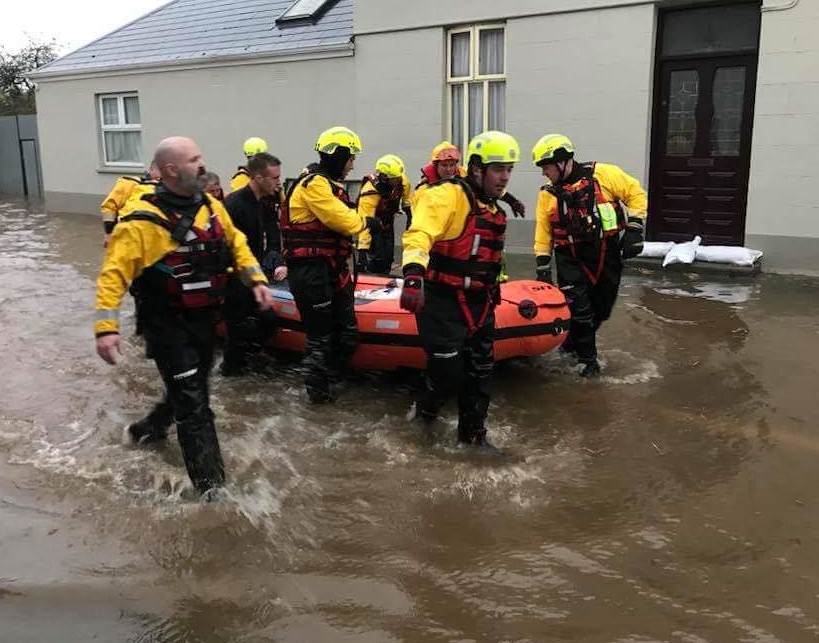
Civil Defence assisting members of the public during flooding Nov 2017

The Civil Defence can be activated by request from civil power (gardaí), local authority, fire services and the Health Service Executive. The organisation may also respond to incidents witnessed in active duty such as road traffic collisions. They may also respond to non-statutory requests at the discretion of the Civil Defence Officer.

Selected notable events in the organisation's history are:

- 1965 North Wall Depot Fire – firefighting support (in support of the Dublin Fire Brigade)
- 1979 Support for the Papal Visit of Pope John Paul II
- 1981 Stardust fire – disaster relief (supporting Dublin Fire Brigade)
- 1987 Raglan House Explosion – firefighting and rescue (supporting Dublin Fire Brigade)
- 1995 Dublin/Wicklow Mountains Forest Fires – firefighting (supporting Dublin Fire Brigade)
- 2002 Flooding in Dublin's North Inner City – rescue and water pumping (supporting Dublin Fire Brigade)
- 2009 Adverse weather Nationwide – flood relief and water supply (supporting County Fire Services, Irish Defence Forces and Gardaí)
- 2017 Storm Ophelia response.
- 2018 Storm Emma response.
- 2020 COVID-19 pandemic Response

== Honours and awards ==
Since the 1990s, Civil Defence Officers and volunteers have been issued several awards by the Department of Defence for long service and service during nationally significant deployments, duties, and commemorations. The awards are presented to recipients as both ribbons and medals, and can be worn on service dress uniforms. Long Service medals are awarded for continuous service in increments of 10 years. Only one long service medal or ribbon may be worn at any one time, depending on length of service, with the most senior award taking precedence. The awards are presented below in order of wear.

COVID-19 pandemic
COVID-19 Pandemic Service Medal	Awarded for service during the COVID-19 Pandemic. The medal consists of a silver cross with the insignia of civil defence. The cross denotes the courage of volunteers who responded to the pandemic and is based on a military campaign cross.
Long Service Awards
60 Year Long Service Medal	Awarded for continuous service of 60 years.
50 Year Long Service Medal	Awarded for continuous service of 50 years.
40 Year Long Service Medal	Awarded for continuous service of 40 years.
30 Year Long Service Medal	Awarded for continuous service of 30 years.
20 Year Long Service Medal	Awarded for continuous service of 20 years.
10 Year Long Service Medal	Awarded for continuous service of 10 years.
Other Awards
Special Olympics Medal	Awarded for service during the 2003 Special Olympics World Summer Games held in Dublin.
Lourdes Medal	Awarded for completion of three International Military Pilgrimages to Lourdes.
Easter Rising Commemoration Medal	Awarded for service during 2016 for the 100-year commemoration of the 1916 Easter Rising.
Civil Defence 50th Anniversary Commemoration Medal	Awarded for service during the 50th anniversary of Civil Defence Ireland's founding in the year 2000.
Civil Defence 75th Anniversary Commemoration Medal	Awarded for service during the 75th anniversary of Civil Defence Ireland's founding in the year 2025.

== Gallery ==
Civil Defence Vehicles and Equipment

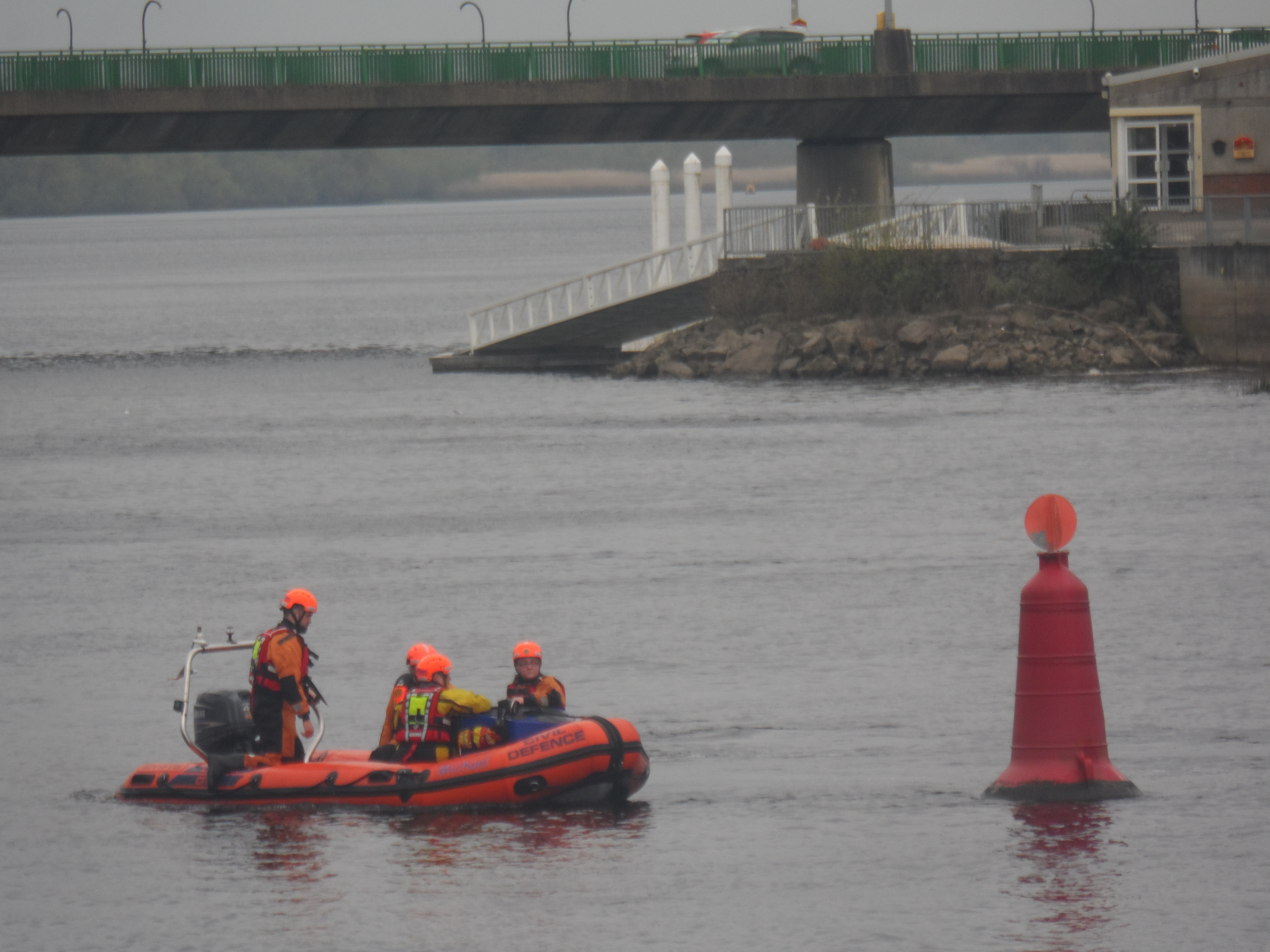
Civil Defence training in the River Shannon, Limerick

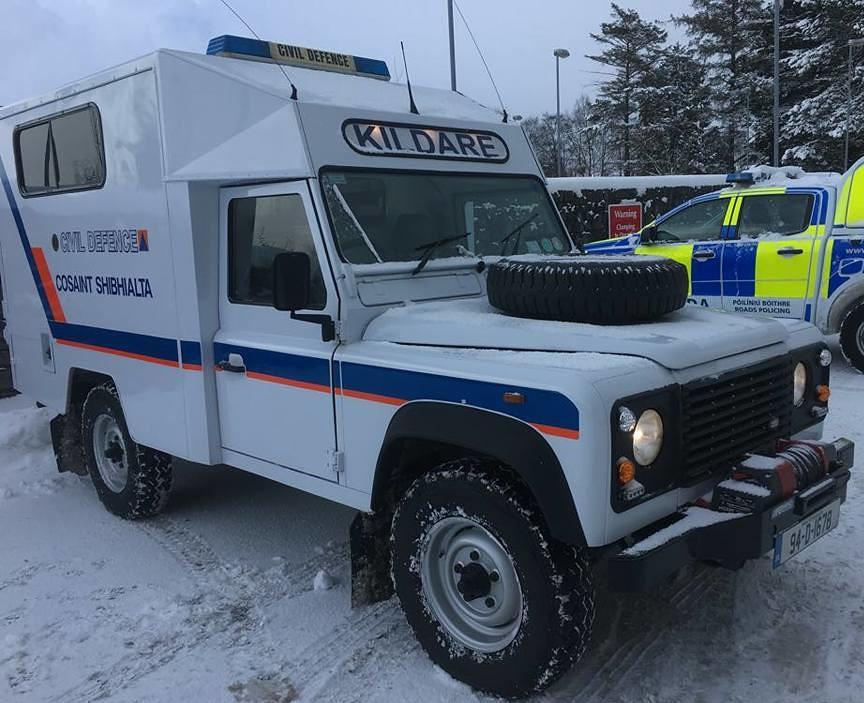
Kildare Civil Defence Land Rover field ambulance

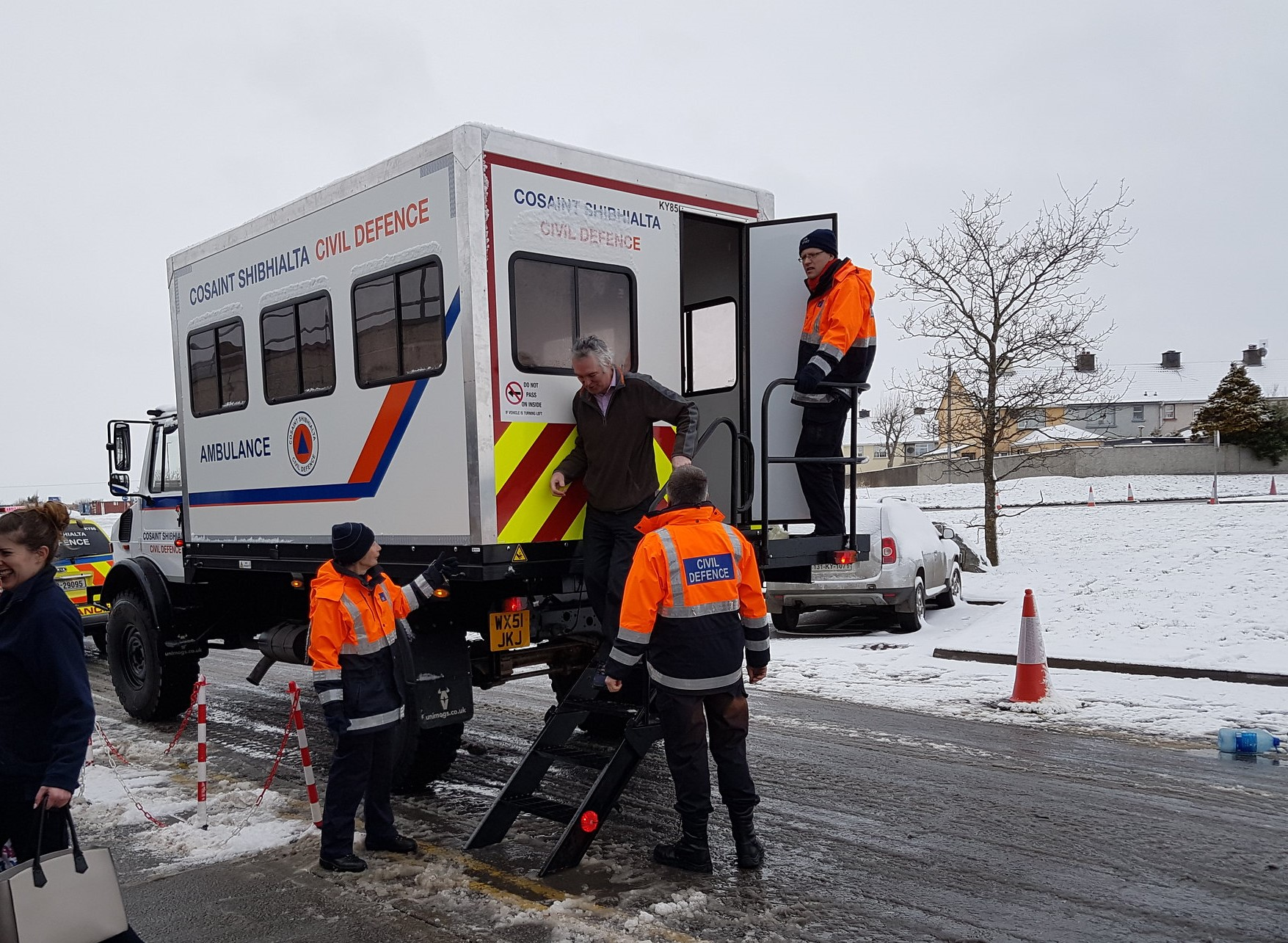
Kerry Civil Defence Unimog assisting in the transport of hospital staff during Storm Emma 2018

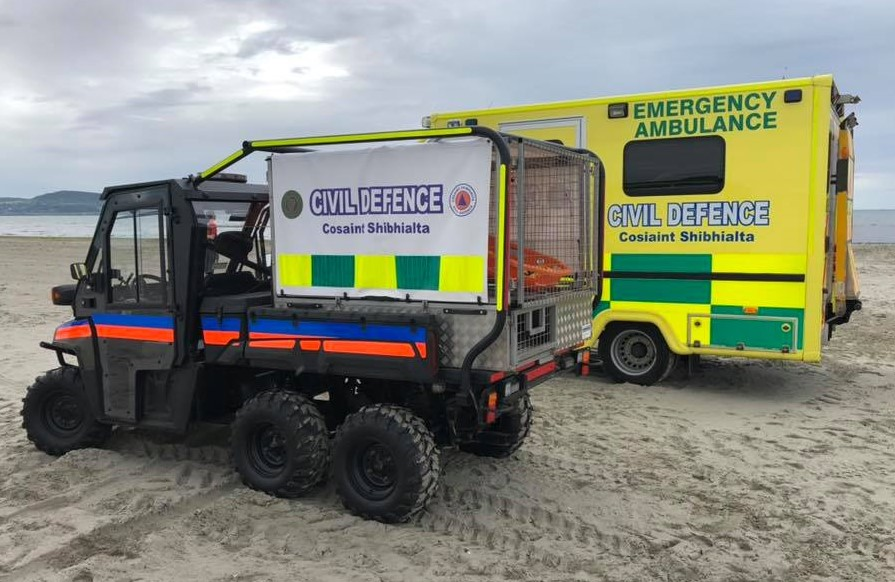
Dublin Civil Defence Polaris and Ambulance

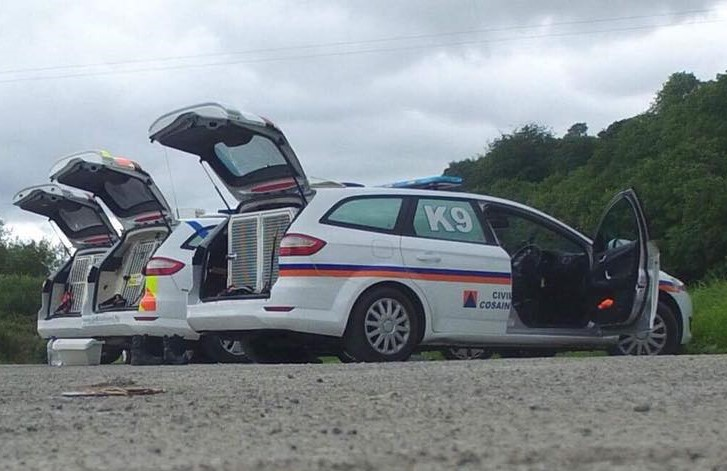
Civil Defence Ireland K9 search units

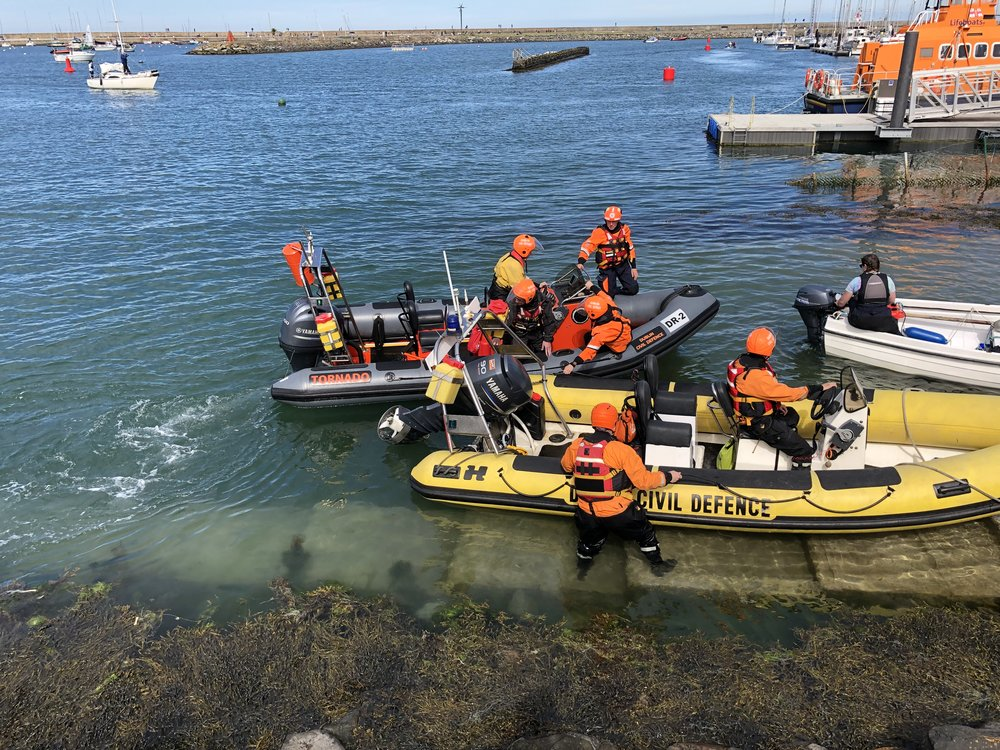
Dublin Civil Defence RHIB crews assisting at the Leinster Sea Swim

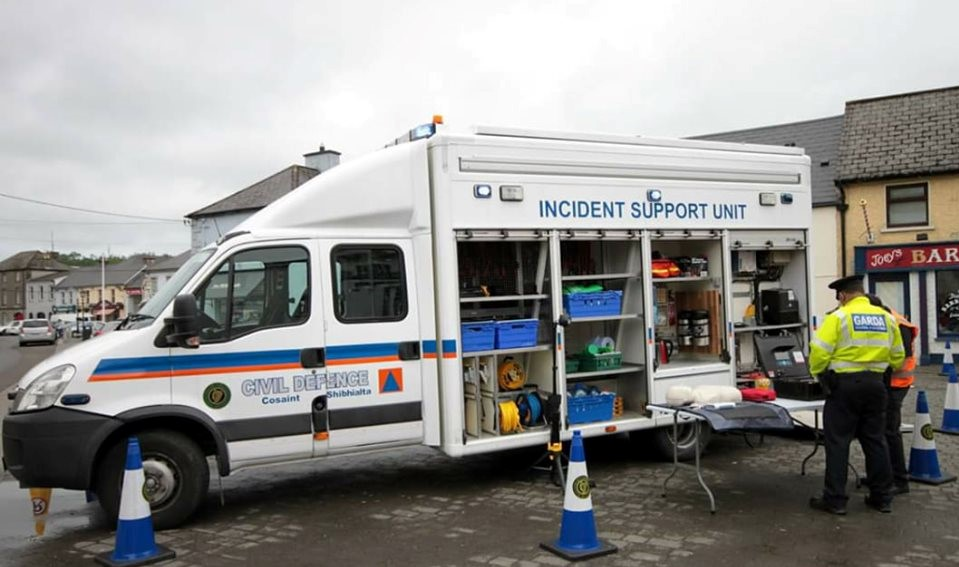
Wicklow Civil Defence Incident Support Unit Vehicle

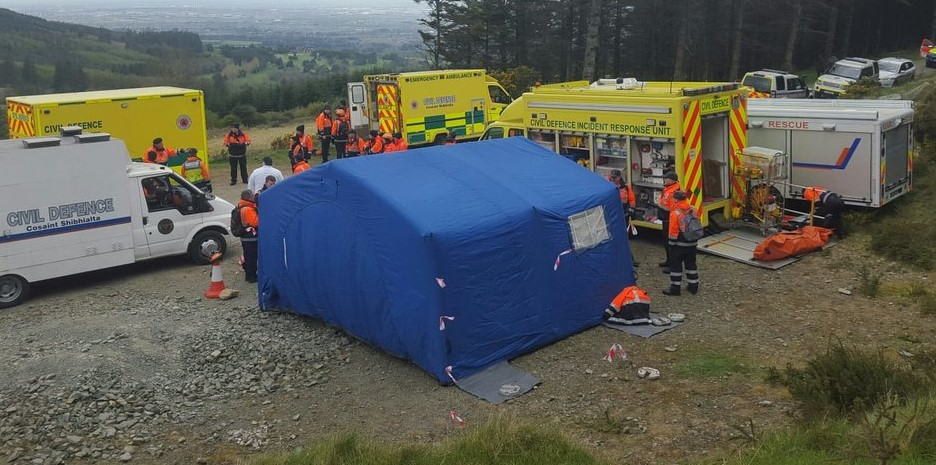
Search and Rescue exercise in the Dublin Mountains

== See also ==
- History of the Republic of Ireland
- Dublin Fire Brigade
- PHECC
- Civil defence by country
- HSE National Ambulance Service
- St John Ambulance Ireland
- Irish Red Cross
- Order of Malta Ambulance Corps
- THW (Germany)
- State Emergency Service (Australia)
- Irish Defence Forces
