= Douglas Hyde =

President of Ireland from 1938 to 1945

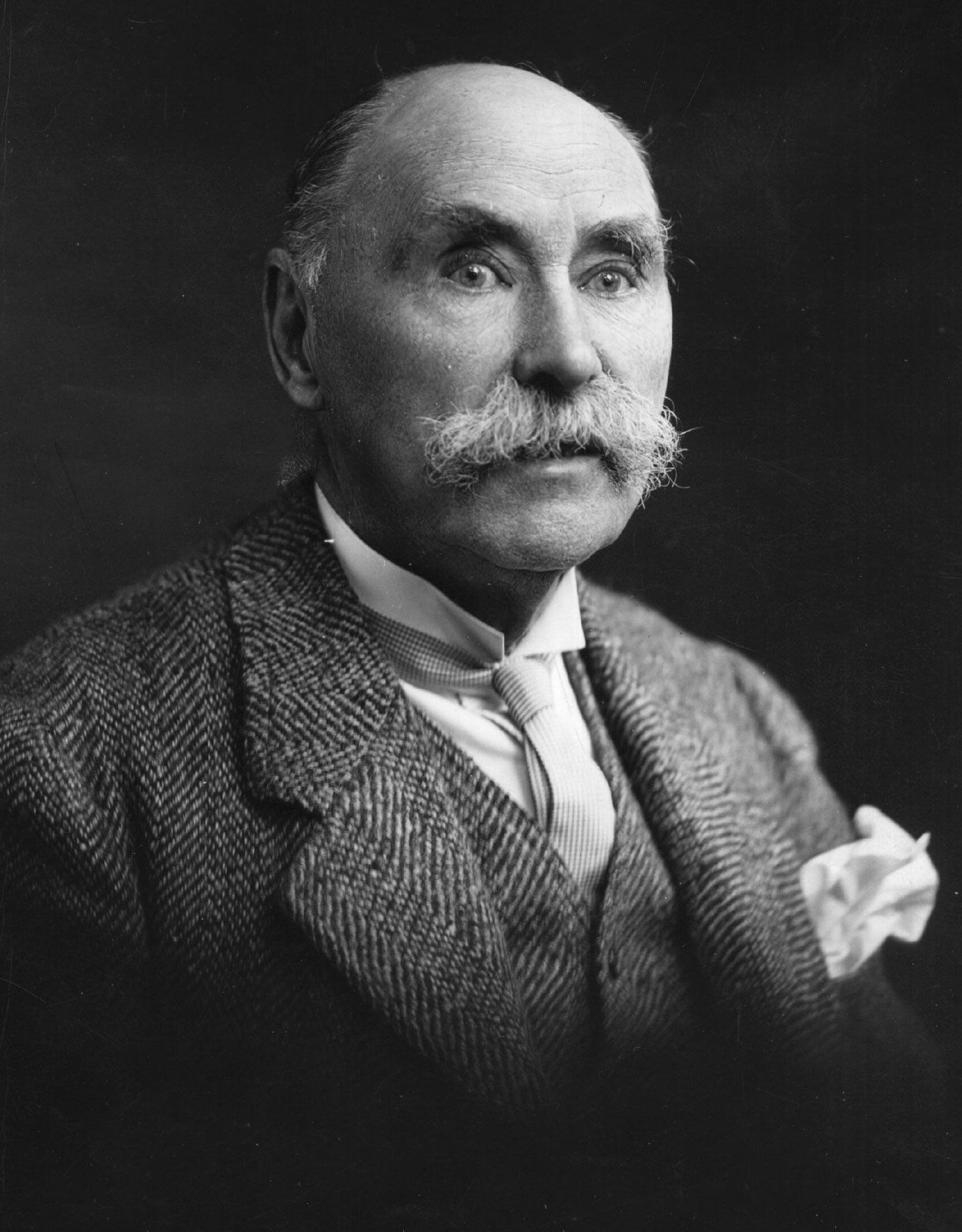
- Hyde, c. 1940

President of Ireland
- In office 25 June 1938 – 24 June 1945
- Taoiseach: Éamon de Valera
- Preceded by: Office established
- Succeeded by: Seán T. O'Kelly

Senator
- In office 27 April 1938 – 4 May 1938
- Constituency: Nominated by the Taoiseach

Senator
- In office 4 February 1925 – 17 September 1925

Personal details
- Born: 17 January 1860 Castlerea, County Roscommon, Ireland
- Died: 12 July 1949 (aged 89) Little Ratra, Phoenix Park, Dublin, Ireland
- Resting place: Portahard Church Cemetery, Frenchpark, County Roscommon, Ireland
- Party: Independent
- Spouse: Lucy Kurtz (m. 1893; died 1938)
- Children: 2
- Education: Trinity College Dublin
- Profession: Academic; Irish language activist; politician; linguist

Douglas Ross Hyde (Irish: Dubhghlas de hÍde; 17 January 1860 – 12 July 1949), known as An Craoibhín Aoibhinn (lit. transl. the pleasant little branch), was an Irish academic, linguist, scholar of the Irish language, politician, and diplomat who served as the first president of Ireland from June 1938 to June 1945. He was a leading figure in the Gaelic revival, and the first president of the Gaelic League, one of the most influential cultural organisations in Ireland at the time.

== Background ==
Hyde was born at Longford House in Castlerea, County Roscommon, while his mother, Elizabeth Hyde (née Oldfield; 1834–1886), was on a short visit. His father, Arthur Hyde, whose family was originally from Castlehyde near Fermoy, County Cork, was Church of Ireland rector of Kilmactranny, County Sligo, from 1852 to 1867, and it was here that Hyde spent his early years. Arthur Hyde and Elizabeth Oldfield married in County Roscommon, in 1852, and had three other children: Arthur Hyde (1853–79 in County Leitrim), John Oldfield Hyde (1854–96 in County Dublin), and Hugh Hyde (1856).

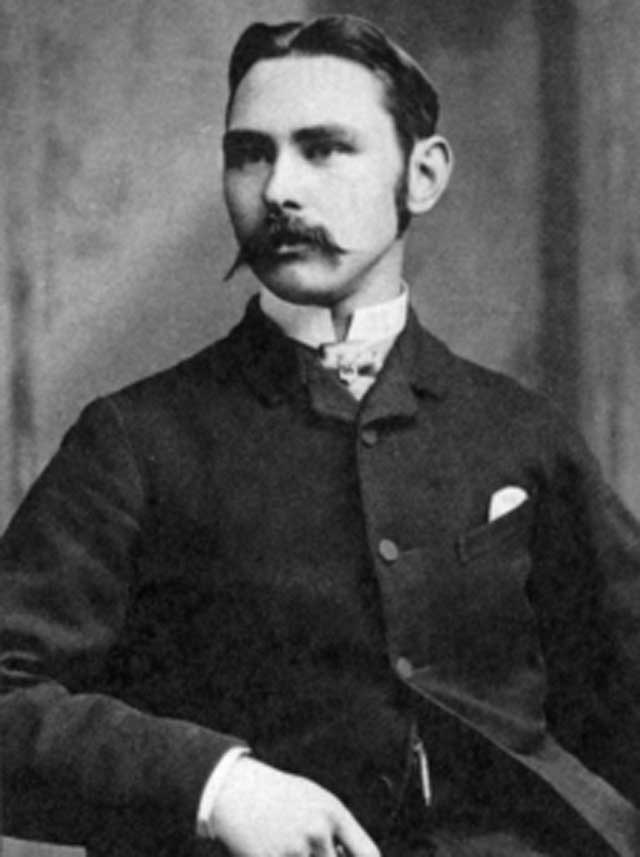
Hyde as a young man

In 1867, his father was appointed prebendary and rector of Tibohine, and the family moved to neighbouring Frenchpark, in County Roscommon. He was home-schooled by his father and his aunt due to a childhood illness. While a young man, he became fascinated with hearing the old people in the locality speak the Irish language. He was influenced in particular by the gamekeeper Séamus Hart and his friend's wife, Mrs. Connolly. Aged 14, Hyde was devastated when Hart died, and his interest in the Irish language—the first language he began to study in any detail, as his own undertaking—flagged for a while. However, he visited Dublin several times and realised that there were groups of people, just like him, interested in Irish, a language looked down on at the time by many and seen as backward and old-fashioned.

Rejecting family pressure that, like past generations of Hydes, he would follow a career as an Anglican clergyman, Hyde instead became an academic. He entered Trinity College Dublin, where he became fluent in French, Latin, German, Greek, and Hebrew, graduating in 1884 as a moderator in modern literature. A medallist of the College Historical Society, he was elected its president in 1931. His passion for the language revival of Irish, which was already in severe decline, led him to help found the Gaelic League, or in Irish, Conradh na Gaeilge, in 1893.

Hyde married German-born but British-raised Lucy Kurtz in 1893. The couple had two daughters, Nuala and Úna.

== Conradh na Gaeilge/Gaelic League ==
Hyde joined the Society for the Preservation of the Irish Language around 1880, and between 1879 and 1884, he published more than a hundred pieces of Irish verse under the pen name An Craoibhín Aoibhinn (lit. transl. the pleasant little branch).

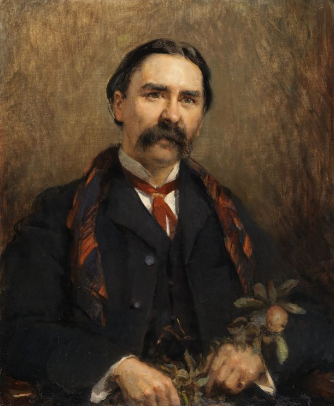
Portrait of Hyde

Initially derided, the Irish language movement gained a mass following. Hyde helped establish the Gaelic Journal in 1892; in November, he wrote a manifesto called The necessity for de-anglicising the Irish nation, arguing that Ireland should follow its own traditions in language, literature, and dress.

In 1893, he helped found Conradh na Gaeilge (the Gaelic League) to encourage the preservation of Irish culture, music, dance and language. A new generation of Irish republicans (including Pádraig Pearse, Éamon de Valera, Michael Collins and Ernest Blythe), became politicised through their involvement in Conradh na Gaeilge. Hyde filled out the 1911 census form in Irish.

Uncomfortable with the growing politicisation of the movement, Hyde resigned the presidency in 1915. He was succeeded by the League's co-founder Eoin MacNeill.

== Senator ==
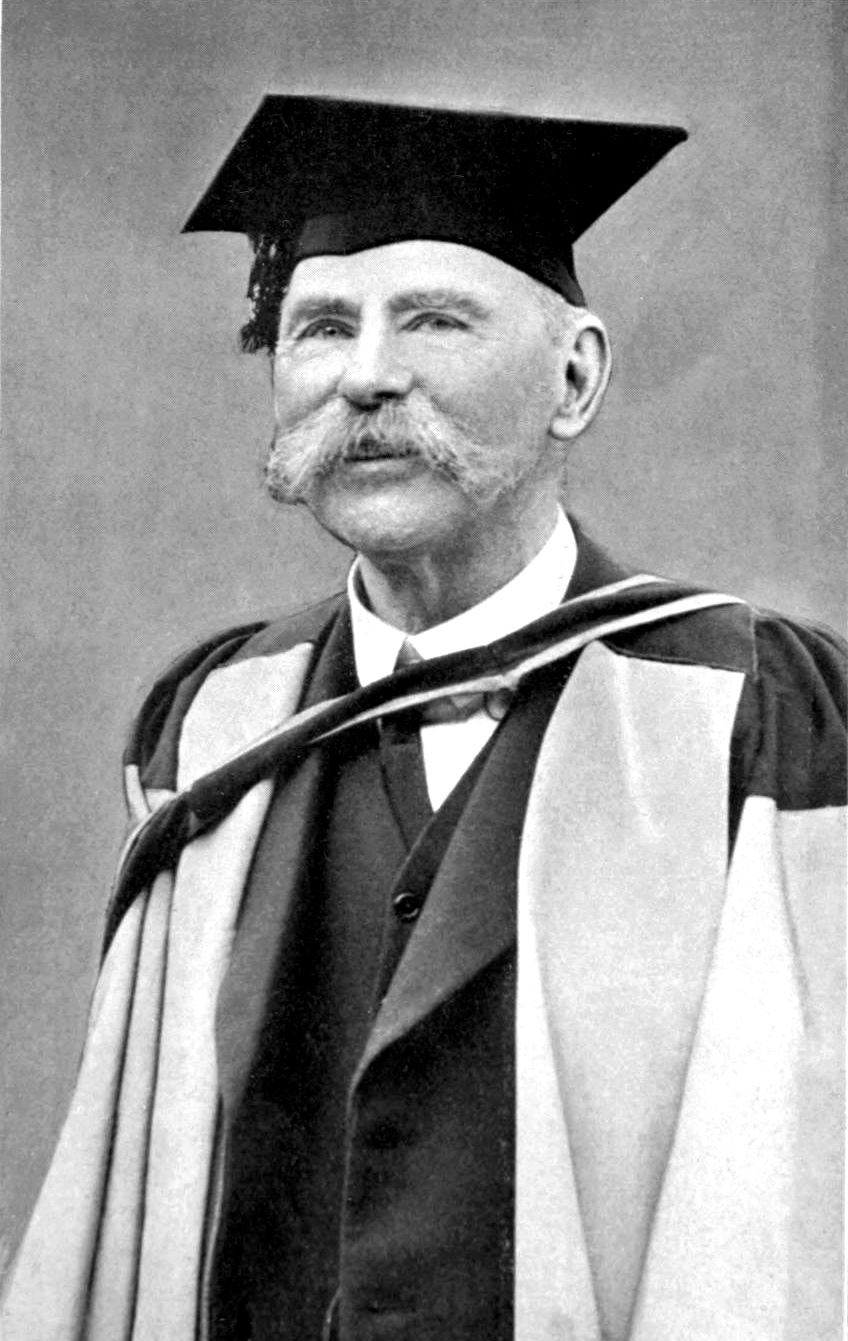
Hyde, circa 1917

Hyde had no association with Sinn Féin and the independence movement. He was elected to Seanad Éireann, the upper house of the Irish Free State's Oireachtas (parliament), at a by-election on 4 February 1925, replacing Sir Hutcheson Poë.

In the 1925 Seanad election, Hyde placed 28th of the 78 candidates, with 19 seats available. The Catholic Truth Society opposed him for his Protestantism and publicised his supposed support for divorce. Historians have suggested that the CTS campaign was ineffective, and that Irish-language advocates performed poorly, with all those endorsed by the Gaelic League losing.

He returned to academia as Professor of Irish at University College Dublin, where one of his students was future Attorney General of Ireland, Chief Justice of Ireland and President of Ireland, Cearbhall Ó Dálaigh.

== President of Ireland ==
Hyde is notable in that he was the only leader of independent Ireland to be featured on its banknotes, here on a Series C Banknote of IR£50.

=== Nomination ===
In April 1938, by now retired from academia, Hyde was plucked from retirement by Taoiseach Éamon de Valera and again appointed to Seanad Éireann. Again his tenure proved short, even shorter than before; however, this time it was because Hyde was chosen, after inter-party negotiations—following an initial suggestion by Fine Gael—to be the first President of Ireland, to which office he was elected unopposed. He was selected for a number of reasons:

- Both the Taoiseach, Éamon de Valera, and the Leader of the Opposition, W. T. Cosgrave, admired him.
- Both wanted a President with universal prestige to lend credibility to the new office, especially since the new 1937 Constitution made it unclear whether the President or the British monarch was the official head of state.
- Both wanted to purge the humiliation that had occurred when Hyde lost his Senate seat in 1925.
- Both wanted a President who would prove there was no danger that the holder of the office would become an authoritarian dictator, a widespread fear when the new constitution was being discussed in 1937.
- Both wanted to pay tribute to Hyde's role in promoting the Irish language.
- Both wanted to choose a non-Catholic to disprove the assertion that the State was a "confessional state", although on 11 May 1937 Seán MacEntee, the Fianna Fáil Minister of Finance, had described the 1937 Constitution in Dáil Éireann as "the Constitution of a Catholic State".

=== Inauguration ===
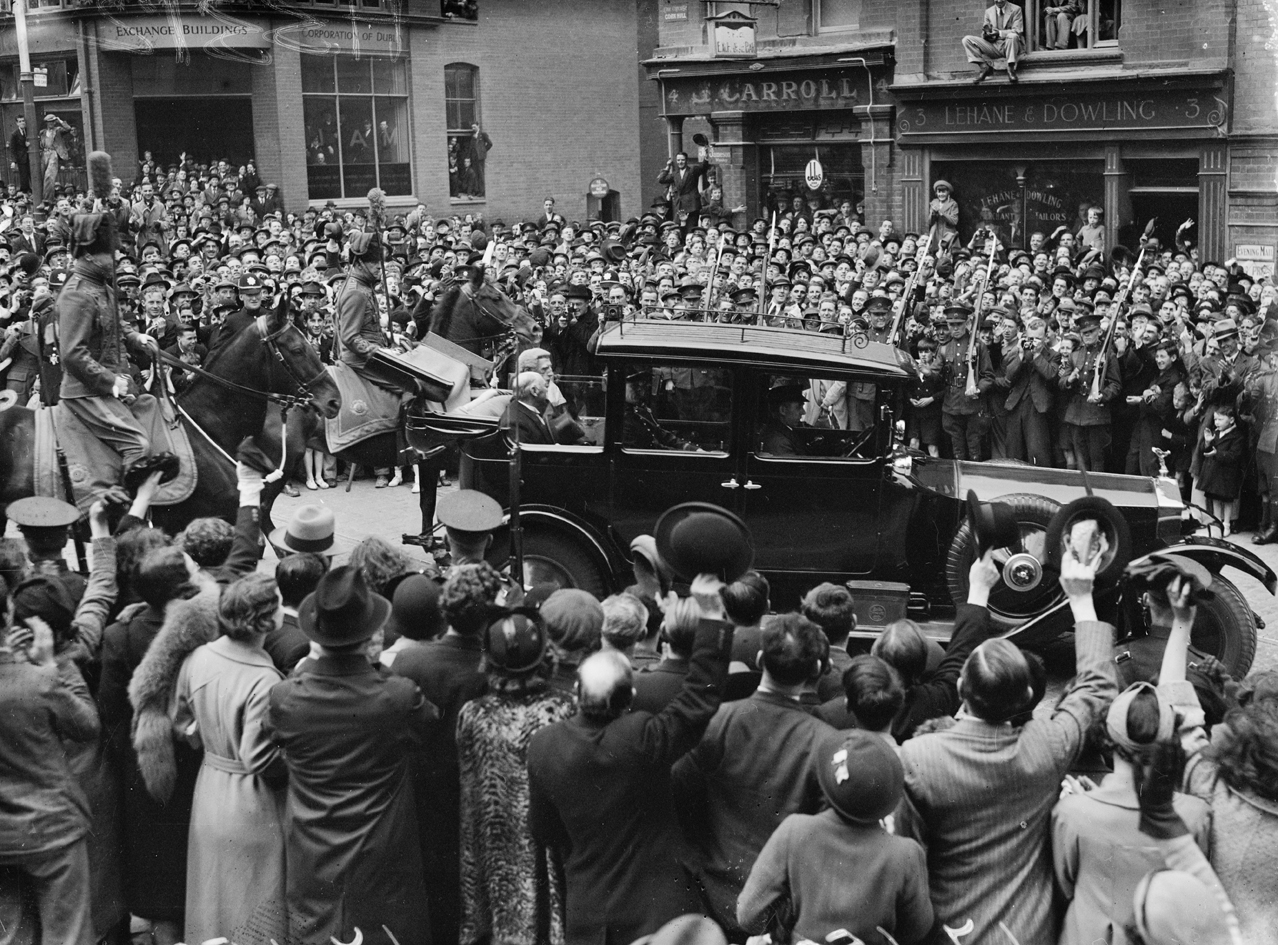
Douglas Hyde (in back of car holding top hat), leaving Dublin Castle with a cavalry escort following his inauguration.

Hyde was inaugurated as the first President of Ireland, on 26 June 1938. The Irish Times reported it as follows:

In the morning [Dr Hyde] attended a service in St. Patrick's Cathedral presided over by the Archbishop of Dublin, Dr. Gregg. Mr. de Valera and his Ministerial colleagues attended a solemn Votive Mass in the Pro-Cathedral, and there were services in the principal Presbyterian and Methodist churches, as well as in the synagogue. Dr. Hyde was installed formally in Dublin Castle, where the seals of office were handed over by the Chief Justice. Some 200 persons were present, including the heads of the Judiciary and the chief dignitaries of the Churches. After the ceremony, President Hyde drove in procession through the beflagged streets. The procession halted for two minutes outside the General Post Office to pay homage to the memory of the men who fell in the Easter Week rebellion of 1916. Large crowds lined the streets from the Castle to the Vice-Regal Lodge and the President was welcomed with bursts of cheering. He wore morning dress, but Mr. de Valera and Mr. Sean T. O'Kelly, who followed Dr. Hyde in the next motor-car, wore black clothes with felt hats. In the evening there was a ceremony in Dublin Castle which was without precedent in Irish history. Mr. and Mrs. de Valera received about 1,500 guests at a reception in honour of the President. The reception was held in St. Patrick's Hall, where the banners of the Knights of St. Patrick are still hung. The attendance included all the members of the Dáil and Senate with their ladies, members of the Judiciary and the chiefs of the Civil Service, Dr. Paschal Robinson, the Papal Nuncio at the head of the Diplomatic Corps, several Roman Catholic Bishops, the Primate of All Ireland, the Archbishop of Dublin, the Bishop of Killaloe, the heads of the Presbyterian and Methodist congregations, the Provost and Vice Provost of Trinity College, and the President of the National University. It was the most colourful event that has been held in Dublin since the inauguration of the new order in Ireland, and the gathering, representing as it did every shade of political, religious, and social opinion in Éire [Ireland], might be regarded as a microcosm of the new Ireland.

Hyde set a precedent by reciting the Presidential Declaration of Office in Irish. His recitation, in Roscommon Irish, is one of a few recordings of a dialect of which Hyde was one of the last speakers. Upon inauguration, he moved into the long-vacant Viceregal Lodge in Phoenix Park, since known as Áras an Uachtaráin.

Hyde's selection and inauguration received worldwide media attention and was covered by newspapers in Australia, New Zealand, South Africa, Argentina, and even Egypt. Hitler "ordered" the Berlin newspapers "to splash" on the Irish presidential installation ceremony. However, the British government ignored the event. The Northern Ireland Finance Minister, J. M. Andrews, described Hyde's inauguration as a "slight on the King" and "a deplorable tragedy".

=== Presidency ===
Despite being placed in a position to shape the office of the presidency via precedent, Hyde by and large opted for a quiet, conservative interpretation of the office. His age and health obligated him to schedule periods of rest throughout his days, and his lack of political experience caused him to defer to his advisers on questions of policy and discretionary powers, especially to his Secretary, Michael McDunphy. On 13 November 1938, just months after Hyde's inauguration, Hyde attended an international soccer match between Ireland and Poland at Dalymount Park in Dublin. This was seen as breaching the GAA's ban on 'foreign games' and he was subsequently removed as patron of the GAA, an honour he had held since 1902.

After a massive stroke in April 1940, plans were made for his lying-in-state and a state funeral. However, Hyde survived, albeit paralysed and having to use a wheelchair.

Although the role of the President of Ireland is largely ceremonial, the president has the authority under the Constitution of Ireland to refuse to grant a dissolution of the Dáil where the Taoiseach has ceased to retain the support of a majority of the Dáil. The president is also the guardian of the constitution and may refer legislation to the Supreme Court before signing it into law.

On 31 July 1943, the Irish postal service release a set of postage stamps valued at ½ and 2½ pence bearing a portrait of Hyde to commemorate the fiftieth anniversary of the Gaelic League.

Hyde and the government were confronted with the challenge of how to run an election during a national emergency, as the 10th Dáil was due to expire in 1943, requiring a dissolution and general election. The constitution and electoral law required the Dáil to be dissolved prior to the election campaign, with a gap of four to six weeks between the dissolution of the outgoing Dáil and the first meeting of the new Dáil. Fearing this gap might facilitate an invasion during World War II, during which no parliament could be called upon to act, the government first attempted to avoid holding an election by extending the Dáil term to six years (the maximum Dáil term under the constitution is 7 years, but it was (and remains) set at 5 years in law). The government abandoned this due to lack of support from the opposition. Instead, the Oireachtas passed the General Elections (Emergency Powers) Act 1943 under the emergency provisions of Article 28.3.3°. This allowed an election to be called separate from a dissolution, with the Dáil only being dissolved just before new Dáil would assemble. This ensured the gap between Dála would be too short to cause a vacuum in major decision-making. Under the Act, the President could "refuse to proclaim a general election on the advice of a Taoiseach who had ceased to retain the support of a majority in Dáil Éireann".

Hyde was confronted with a crisis in 1944 when de Valera's government unexpectedly collapsed in a vote on the Transport Bill. Hyde had the option to refuse to proclaim the election but, after considering it with his senior advisor Michael McDunphy, consented to it.

Hyde twice used his prerogative under Article 26 of the Constitution, having consulted the Council of State, to refer a Bill or part of a Bill to the Supreme Court, for the court's decision on whether the Bill or part referred is repugnant to the Constitution (so that the Bill in question cannot be signed into law). On the first occasion, the court held that the Bill referred – Offences Against the State (Amendment) Bill 1940 – was not repugnant to the Constitution. In response to the second reference, the Court decided that the particular provision referred to – section 4 of the School Attendance Bill 1942 – was repugnant to the Constitution. Because of Article 34.3.3° of the Constitution, the constitutional validity of the Offences Against the State (Amendment) Act, 1940 cannot be challenged in any court, since the Bill which became that Act was found by the Supreme Court not to be repugnant in the context of an Article 26 reference.

One of Hyde's last presidential acts was a visit to the German Ambassador Eduard Hempel, on 3 May 1945, to offer his formal condolences on the death of Adolf Hitler. The visit remained a secret until 2005.

== Retirement and death ==
Hyde left office on 25 June 1945, opting not to nominate himself for a second term. Owing to his ill-health he did not return to his Roscommon home, Ratra, empty since the death of his wife early in his term. He moved into the former residence of the Secretary to the Lord Lieutenant, on the grounds of Áras an Uachtaráin, which he renamed Little Ratra, where he lived out the remaining four years of his life. He died at 10 pm on 12 July 1949, aged 89.

== State funeral ==
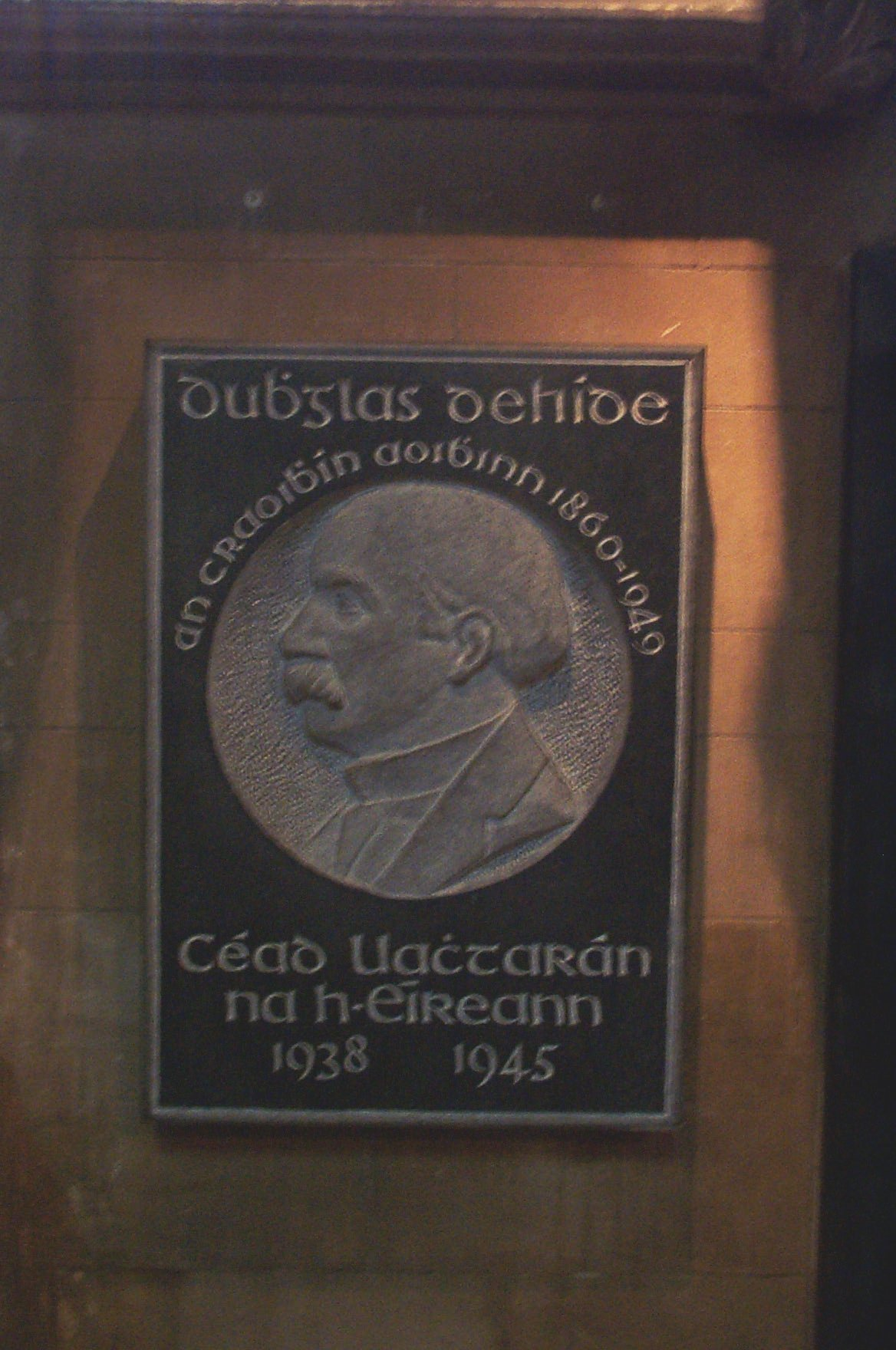
Memorial to Douglas Hyde in St. Patrick's Cathedral, Dublin

As a former President of Ireland, Hyde was accorded a state funeral. As he was a member of the Church of Ireland, his funeral service took place in Dublin's Church of Ireland St. Patrick's Cathedral. However, contemporary rules of the Roman Catholic Church in Ireland prohibited its members from attending services in non-Catholic churches. As a result, all but one member of the Catholic cabinet, Noël Browne, remained outside the cathedral grounds while the funeral service took place. They then joined the cortège when his coffin left the cathedral. Éamon de Valera, by now Leader of the Opposition, also did not attend. He was represented instead by a senior Fianna Fáil figure who was a member of the Church of Ireland, Erskine H. Childers, a future President of Ireland himself. Hyde was buried in Frenchpark, County Roscommon at Portahard Church, (where he had spent most of his childhood life) beside his wife Lucy, his daughter Nuala, his sister Annette, his mother Elizabeth, and his father Arthur.

== In memoriam ==
Name	Location	Notes
Gaelscoil de hÍde	Roscommon	In 2000 Gaelscoil de hÍde was set up in Roscommon town. Currently, 120 students attend the school.
Gaelscoil de hÍde	Oranmore, County Galway	The Irish-speaking primary school was founded in 1994 in Oranmore, County Galway.
Gaelscoil de hÍde	Fermoy, County Cork	Gaelscoil de hÍde is the only Gaelscoil in Fermoy, County Cork and currently accommodates 332 pupils.
Coláiste an Chraoibhín	Fermoy, County Cork	Founded in 1987, this secondary school takes its name from Hyde's pseudonym. The school overlooks the Hyde family's ancestral estate of Castlehyde. There are over 900 students in the school.
Hyde Museum	Frenchpark, County Roscommon	His father's old church is now a museum dedicated to showing memorabilia about Douglas Hyde.
Coláiste de hÍde	Tallaght, Dublin	Coláiste de hÍde, a Gaelcholáiste (all-Irish second-level school) was founded in 1993 in Tallaght, South Dublin in his honour.
Dr. Hyde Park	Roscommon	Dr. Hyde Park is the home of Roscommon GAA. Opened in 1969 it has a capacity of 25,000. It hosts many championship matches due to Roscommon's geographical positioning.
Douglas Hyde Gallery	Dublin	The Douglas Hyde Gallery is located in Trinity College Dublin. It was opened in 1978 and it is home to many contemporary art exhibitions.

Political offices
New office	President of Ireland; 1938–1945	Succeeded by Seán T. O'Kelly
Preceded by Lord Glenavy	President of the Trinity College Historical Society; 1931–1949	Succeeded by Sir Robert W. Tate
