= Lucy Kurtz =

Spouse of the first president of Ireland

- Born: Lucy Cometina Kurtz; 11 April 1861; Berlin, Germany
- Died: 31 December 1938 (aged 77); Frenchpark, County Roscommon, Ireland
- Resting place: Portahard Church Cemetery, Frenchpark
- Education: University of Zurich; Trinity College Dublin
- Spouse: Douglas Hyde (m. 1893)
- Children: 2

Lucy Cometina Kurtz (11 April 1861 – 31 December 1938) was the wife of the first President of Ireland, Douglas Hyde.

== Life ==
Kurtz was born on 11 April 1861, in Berlin, Kingdom of Prussia, and christened on 4 September 1861, in Liverpool, United Kingdom. Her father was a manufacturing chemist. She was introduced to Douglas Hyde by Hyde's sister, Annette. Kurtz had met Annette in Killarney.

Kurtz married Hyde on 10 October 1893 in Liverpool. They had two daughters, Nuala and Una. Nuala died in 1916 of tuberculosis. The couple disagreed about how the Gaelic League treated Hyde, with Kurtz believing the League were demeaning and exploiting him. She developed a hatred for the League, the Irish language, and County Roscommon where the family lived. She became chronically ill, possibly suffering from neurasthenia. Hyde cared for her during her illness.

She died on 31 December 1938, at Ratra in Frenchpark, County Roscommon, after her husband's election. Due to her ill health, she had not moved into the presidential residence in Phoenix Park, Áras an Uachtaráin.
