= The President's Award =

The President's Award may refer to:

- Gaisce – The President's Award
- The Explorers Club The President's Award
