= Fort Templebreedy =

Defensive fort for Cork Harbour, Ireland

- Dún Theampall Bríde
- Near Crosshaven in County Cork in Ireland
- Irish Coastal Defence Artillery exercise at Fort Templebreedy in the 1940s

Site information
- Type: Coastal defence battery
- Owner: Department of Defence
- Condition: Largely deconstructed
- Emplacements: Two BL 9.2 inch Mark X guns (Other Quick-firing practice guns)

Location
- Coordinates: 51.79036°N 8.28306°W
- Area: 37 acres (15 ha)

Site history
- Built: 1904-1909
- In use: Until ~1940s (as coast defence); Until ~1980s (as training camp)

Garrison information
- Occupants: British Armed Forces, Irish Defence Forces

Fort Templebreedy (Irish: Dún Theampall Bríde), also known as Templebreedy Battery, was a coastal defence fortification close to Crosshaven, in County Cork, Ireland. Supplementing a number of earlier structures at Fort Camden and Fort Davis, the site was developed between 1904 and 1909 to defend the mouth of Cork Harbour. Used as a coastal artillery position until the 1940s, and as a military training camp until the late 20th century, many of the structures of the 37-acre site were dismantled over time, and part of the complex used as a pitch and putt course. In 2009, Cork County Council added the site to a proposed list of protected structures – though as of 2022 it remained in the ownership of the Department of Defence.

== History ==
As with other earlier coastal defence fortifications at Fort Camden (Crosshaven) and Fort Carlisle (Whitegate), the batteries at Templebreedy were designed to defend the strategically important entrance to Cork Harbour. By the early 20th century, a number of improvements were proposed to the harbour defences – including the installation of newer Breech-loading 9.2 Inch guns. Rather than installing these guns at Fort Camden, it was decided to build separate batteries slightly south of the existing fort, at Templebreedy, to cover threats outside the harbour approaches in the Celtic Sea.

Built between 1904 and 1909, the fortification included concrete gun emplacements for two BL 9.2 inch Mark X guns, underground magazines, searchlights, and a number of machine-gun positions. A practice range was added later for smaller QF 12-pounder guns. A further battery was constructed for BL 6-inch Mark VII guns; however, these were never installed. By the end of construction in 1909, there was accommodation in place for four officers and 81 non-commissioned officers and men.

Throughout the First World War (1914–1918), the harbour was used as a naval base to cover the "Western Approaches", and the battery complemented the defences of Fort Camden and Fort Carlisle. During the Irish War of Independence (1919–1921), Templebreedy was somewhat isolated, and ambushes by IRA Brigades were not uncommon on supplies to the fort. Following the Anglo-Irish Treaty the harbour defences remained in the control of British Armed Forces, until July 1938 when the Treaty Port installations, including Templebreedy, were relinquished to Irish authorities.

The Irish Defence Forces continued to maintain and operate the batteries throughout the Emergency (WWII), until the defences were largely decommissioned in 1946. Though the large 9.2 inch guns remained in place until the 1960s, the buildings and grounds continued to be used into the 1970s and later (including for training camps by Army Reserve (FCÁ) and Naval Reserve (Slua Muirí)).

As of the early 21st century, though a number of buildings, concrete emplacements, underground magazine stores and other structures still stand, no guns or defensive elements remain, and the site is no longer used for military purposes.

== Today ==
Plan of lower harbour showing location relative to other installations: (A) Haulbowline Naval Base, (B) Fort Mitchel/Westmoreland, (C) Fort Meagher/Camden, (D) Fort Davis/Carlisle, (E) Fort Templebreedy

From the original construction of the fortifications at Templebreedy, there was some contention about access rights. This manifest in political debates about rights of way (as early as 1909), suspected unauthorised access resulting in accidental shooting (in 1940), building of houses off Defence Forces' access roads (1949), and "overholding" of assigned quarters by Defence Forces' personnel (as late as 2012).

Some years after the complex ceased to be used for active defence purposes, some of the site was laid-out as a pitch and putt course. However this was closed – amid some controversy – in 2005. Though Cork County Council added Fort Templebreedy to a list of protected structures in 2009, ostensibly to protect the site and potentially prepare it for development as a heritage and recreation site, as of 2020 it remained in the ownership of the Department of Defence. Public access to the site therefore remains limited.

== See also ==
- List of Irish military installations
