= Gyro monorail =

Single rail land vehicle

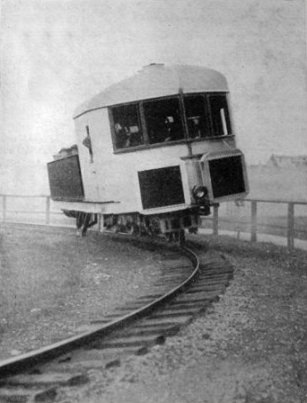
- The 22-tonne (22-long-ton; 24-short-ton) (unladen weight) prototype vehicle developed by Louis Brennan
- Classification: Monorail
- Industry: Rail transport
- Application: Transportation
- Inventor: Louis Brennan
- Invented: 1903 (123 years ago)

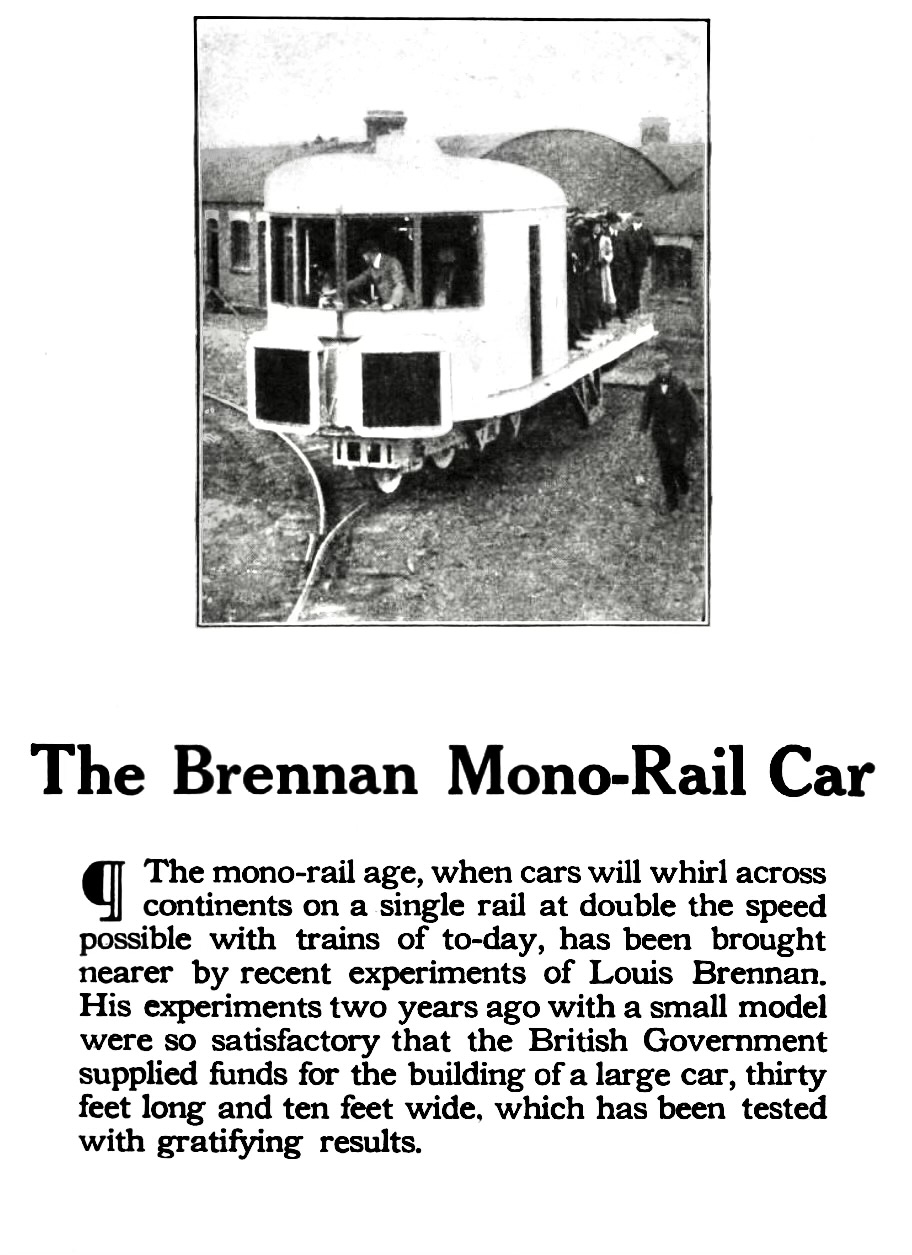
Brennan Mono Rail

A gyro monorail, gyroscopic monorail, gyro-stabilized monorail, or Brennan monorail is a single-rail land vehicle that uses the gyroscopic action of one or more spinning wheels to overcome the inherent instability of balancing atop a single rail. For a similar steerable vehicle, see Gyrocar.

The monorail is associated with the names Louis Brennan, August Scherl and Pyotr Shilovsky, who each built full-scale working prototypes during the early part of the twentieth century. A version was developed by Ernest F. Swinney, Harry Ferreira and Louis E. Swinney in the US in 1962.

The gyro monorail was never developed beyond the prototype stage.

The principal advantage of the monorail cited by Shilovsky is the suppression of hunting oscillation, a speed limitation encountered by conventional railways at the time. Also, sharper turns are possible compared to the multi-kilometre radius of turn typical of modern high-speed trains such as the TGV, because the vehicle will bank automatically on bends, like an aircraft, so that no lateral centrifugal acceleration is experienced on board.

A major drawback is that many cars – including passenger and freight cars, not just the locomotive – would require a powered gyroscope to stay upright.

Unlike other means of maintaining balance, such as lateral shifting of the centre of gravity or the use of reaction wheels, the gyroscopic balancing system is statically stable, so that the control system serves only to impart dynamic stability. The active part of the balancing system is therefore more accurately described as a roll damper.

== History ==
=== Brennan's monorail ===
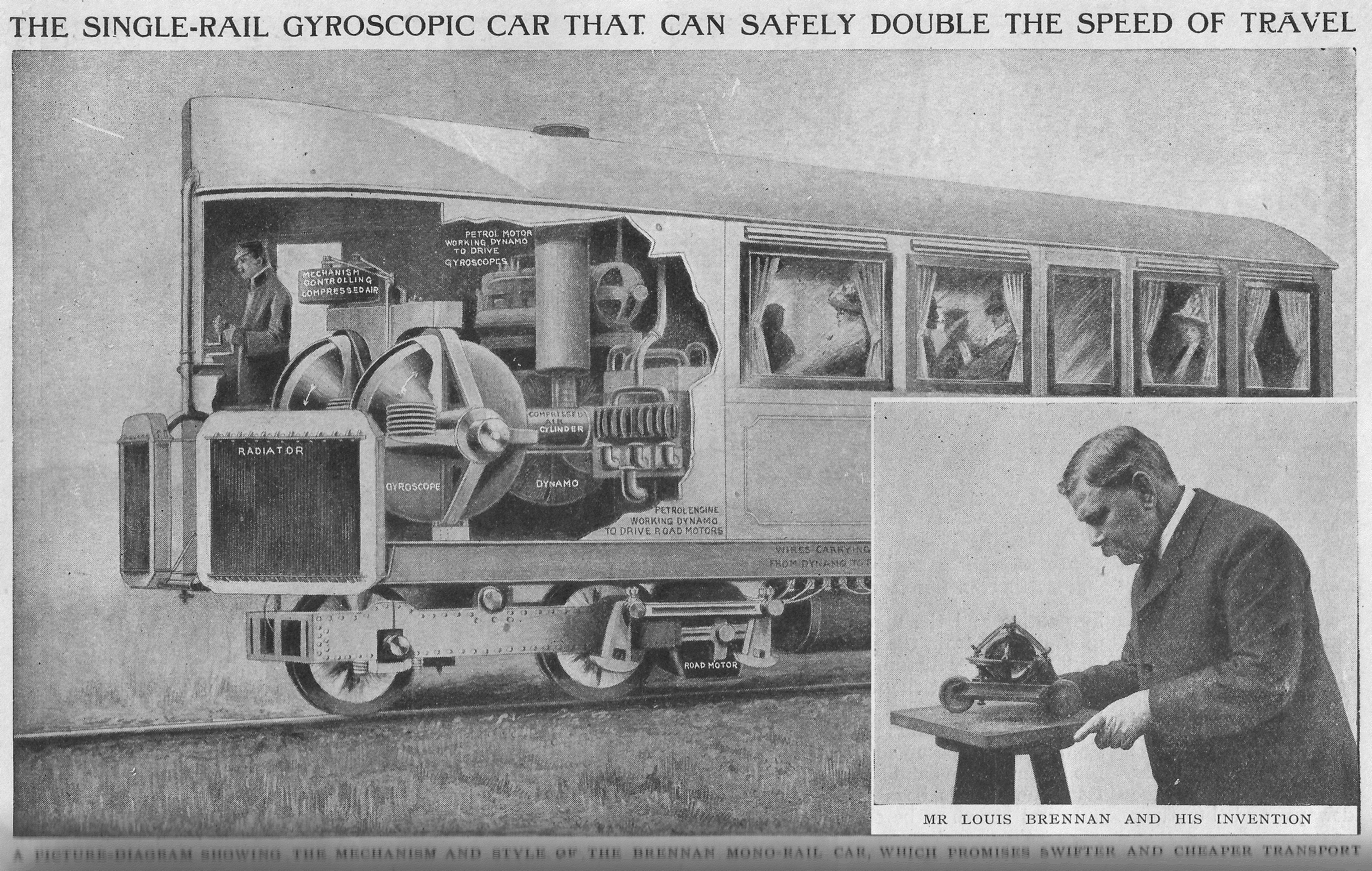
Harmsworth Popular Science illustration showing the monorail mechanism, and (inset) Louis Brennan

Louis Brennan developed a 22-tonne (22-long-ton; 24-short-ton) (unladen weight) prototype vehicle. Brennan filed his first monorail patent in 1903.

His first demonstration model was just a 30.0-by-11.8-inch (762 by 300 mm) box containing the balancing system. However, this was sufficient for the Army Council to recommend a sum of £10,000 for the development of a full-size vehicle. This was vetoed by their Financial Department. However, the Army found £2,000 from various sources to fund Brennan's work.

Within this budget Brennan produced a larger model, 6.0 by 1.5 feet (1.83 by 0.46 m), kept in balance by two 5.0-inch (127 mm) diameter gyroscope rotors. This model is still in existence in the London Science Museum. The track for the vehicle was laid in the grounds of Brennan's house in Gillingham, Kent. It consisted of ordinary gas piping laid on wooden sleepers, with a 50-foot (15 m) wire rope bridge, sharp corners and slopes up to one in five. Brennan demonstrated his model in a lecture to the Royal Society in 1907 when it was shown running back and forth "on a taught and slender wire" "under the perfect control of the inventor".

Brennan's reduced scale railway largely vindicated the War Department's initial enthusiasm. However, the election in 1906 of a Liberal government, with policies of financial retrenchment, effectively stopped the funding from the Army. However, the India Office voted an advance of £6,000 (equivalent to £624,053 in 2025) in 1907 to develop the monorail for the North West Frontier region, and a further £5,000 (equivalent to £520,044 in 2025) was advanced by the Durbar of Kashmir in 1908. This money was almost spent by January 1909, when the India Office advanced a further £2,000 (equivalent to £205,828 in 2025).

On 15 October 1909, the railcar ran under its own power for the first time, carrying 32 people around the factory. The vehicle had a 20-horsepower (15 kW) petrol engine with a speed of 22 miles per hour (35 km/h). The transmission was electric, with the petrol engine driving a generator, and electric motors located on both bogies. This generator also supplied power to the gyro motors and the air compressor. The balancing system used a pneumatic servo, rather than the friction wheels used in the earlier model. The gyros were located in the cab, although Brennan planned to re-site them under the floor of the vehicle before displaying the vehicle in public, but the unveiling of Scherl's machine forced him to bring forward the first public demonstration to 10 November 1909. There was insufficient time to re-position the gyros before the monorail's public debut.

In December 1909, Brennan demonstrated the railcar to the Royal Society. It carried 40 people at a speed of 40 km/h (25 mph) on a single-rail circular track that was 200 m (660 ft) in circumference. The length, height, and width of the vehicle was 12.2 m × 4.0 m × 3.0 m (40 ft × 13 ft × 10 ft).

The public debut for Brennan's monorail was the Japan-British Exhibition at the White City, London in 1910. The monorail car carried 50 passengers at a time around a circular track at 20 miles per hour (32 km/h). Passengers included Winston Churchill, who showed considerable enthusiasm. Interest was such that children's clockwork monorail toys, single-wheeled and gyro-stabilised, were produced in England and Germany. Although a viable means of transport, the monorail failed to attract further investment. Of the two vehicles built, one was sold as scrap, and the other was used as a park shelter until 1930.

=== Scherl's car ===
Just as Brennan completed testing his vehicle, August Scherl, a German publisher and philanthropist, announced a public demonstration of the gyro monorail which he had developed in Germany. The demonstration was to take place on Wednesday 10 November 1909 at the Berlin Zoological Gardens.

Scherl's monorail car

Scherl's machine, also a full-size vehicle, was somewhat smaller than Brennan's, with a length and width of only 5.5 by 1.2 m (18 by 4 ft). It could accommodate four passengers on a pair of transverse bench seats. While Brennan used a pair of horizontal axis gyros, Scherl's gyros had vertical axes. They consisted of the 57 kg (125 lb) flywheels that were located under the seats, and rotated at 8,000 revolutions per minute. The servomechanism was hydraulic, and propulsion electric.

Scherl's railcar had two additional safety features. The first is that the gyroscopes would keep rotating several hours without power before they stopped completely, allowing the vehicle to be stopped long before it lost its balance. The second was small wheels at each corner that could be lowered to the ground to stabilize the vehicle before the gyros stopped.

Strictly speaking, August Scherl merely provided the financial backing. The righting mechanism was invented by Paul Fröhlich, and the car designed by Emil Falcke.

A Scientific American editorial questioned its practicality due to possible changes to rails and bridges. Although well received and performing perfectly during its public demonstrations, the car failed to attract significant financial support, and Scherl wrote off his investment in it.

=== Shilovsky's work ===
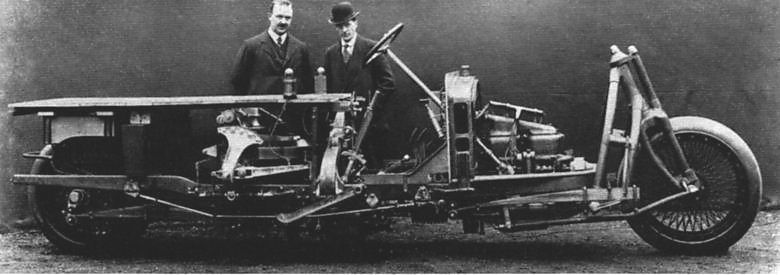
Pyotr Shilovsky's gyrocar

Following the failure of Brennan and Scherl to attract the necessary investment, the practical development of the gyro-monorail after 1910 continued with the work of Pyotr Shilovsky, a Russian aristocrat residing in London. His balancing system was based on slightly different principles to those of Brennan and Scherl, and permitted the use of a smaller, more slowly spinning gyroscope.

=== Post-World War I developments ===
In 1922, the Soviet government began construction of a Shilovsky monorail between Leningrad and Tsarskoe Selo, but funds ran out shortly after the project was begun.

In 1929, at the age of 74, Brennan also developed a gyrocar. This was turned down by a consortium of Austin/Morris/Rover, on the basis that they could sell all the conventional cars they built.

=== 21st century: Monocab ===
In October 2022 the Technische Hochschule OWL, the Bielefeld University of Applied Sciences, the Fraunhofer-Institut für Optronik, Systemtechnik und Bildauswertung and the Landeseisenbahn Lippe e. V. presented a gyro-stabilized monorail based on Brennan's system on a section of the Extertal railway in Germany.

The system called Monocab is meant to permit bi-directional service on a single track since the vehicles use only one rail. The cabins that shall operate autonomously on-demand are designed accordingly narrow.

In September 2020 Monocab was funded from the European Regional Development Fund and by the state of North Rhine-Westphalia with 3.6 million euros combined.

== Principles of operation ==
=== Basic idea ===
The vehicle runs on a single conventional rail, so that without the balancing system it would topple over.

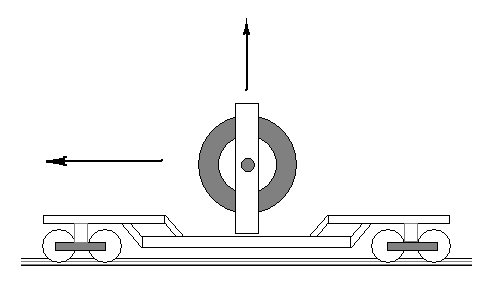
Basic principle of operation: rotation about the vertical axis causes movement about the horizontal axis.

A spinning wheel is mounted in a gimbal frame whose axis of rotation (the precession axis) is perpendicular to the spin axis. The assembly is mounted on the vehicle chassis such that, at equilibrium, the spin axis, precession axis and vehicle roll axis are mutually perpendicular.

Forcing the gimbal to rotate causes the wheel to precess resulting in gyroscopic torques about the roll axis, so that the mechanism has the potential to right the vehicle when tilted from the vertical. The wheel shows a tendency to align its spin axis with the axis of rotation (the gimbal axis), and it is this action which rotates the entire vehicle about its roll axis.

Ideally, the mechanism applying control torques to the gimbal ought to be passive (an arrangement of springs, dampers and levers), but the fundamental nature of the problem indicates that this would be impossible. The equilibrium position is with the vehicle upright, so that any disturbance from this position reduces the height of the centre of gravity, lowering the potential energy of the system. Whatever returns the vehicle to equilibrium must be capable of restoring this potential energy, and hence cannot consist of passive elements alone. The system must contain an active servo of some kind.

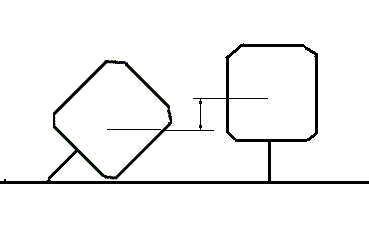
Disturbed cg height. (The difference in height shown is exaggerated.) The balancing system must do work against gravity to right the vehicle when disturbed.

=== Side loads ===
If constant side forces were resisted by gyroscopic action alone, the gimbal would rotate quickly on to the stops, and the vehicle would topple. In fact, the mechanism causes the vehicle to lean into the disturbance, resisting it with a component of weight, with the gyro near its undeflected position.

Inertial side forces, arising from cornering, cause the vehicle to lean into the corner. A single gyro introduces an asymmetry which will cause the vehicle to lean too far, or not far enough for the net force to remain in the plane of symmetry, so side forces will still be experienced on board.

In order to ensure that the vehicle banks correctly on corners, it is necessary to remove the gyroscopic torque arising from the vehicle rate of turn.

A free gyro keeps its orientation with respect to inertial space, and gyroscopic moments are generated by rotating it about an axis perpendicular to the spin axis. But the control system deflects the gyro with respect to the chassis, and not with respect to the fixed stars. It follows that the pitch and yaw motion of the vehicle with respect to inertial space will introduce additional unwanted, gyroscopic torques. These give rise to unsatisfactory equilibria, but more seriously, cause a loss of static stability when turning in one direction, and an increase in static stability in the opposite direction. Shilovsky encountered this problem with his road vehicle, which consequently could not make sharp left hand turns.

Brennan and Scherl were aware of this problem, and implemented their balancing systems with pairs of counter rotating gyros, precessing in opposite directions. With this arrangement, all motion of the vehicle with respect to inertial space causes equal and opposite torques on the two gyros, and are consequently cancelled out. With the double gyro system, the instability on bends is eliminated and the vehicle will bank to the correct angle, so that no net side force is experienced on board.

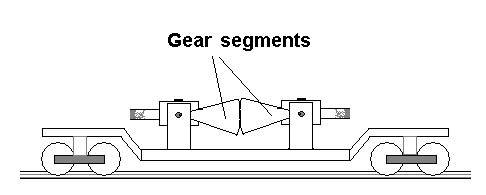
When cornering, the counter-rotating gyros avoid instability on corners.

Shilovsky claimed to have difficulty ensuring stability with double-gyro systems, although the reason why this should be so is not clear. His solution was to vary the control loop parameters with turn rate, to maintain similar response in turns of either direction.

Offset loads similarly cause the vehicle to lean until the centre of gravity lies above the support point. Side winds cause the vehicle to tilt into them, to resist them with a component of weight. These contact forces are likely to cause more discomfort than cornering forces, because they will result in net side forces being experienced on board.

The contact side forces result in a gimbal deflection bias in a Shilovsky loop. This may be used as an input to a slower loop to shift the centre of gravity laterally, so that the vehicle remains upright in the presence of sustained non-inertial forces. This combination of gyro and lateral cg shift is the subject of a 1962 patent. A vehicle using a gyro/lateral payload shift was built by Ernest F. Swinney, Harry Ferreira and Louis E. Swinney in the US in 1962. This system is called the Gyro-Dynamics monorail.

== Comparison to two-rail vehicles ==
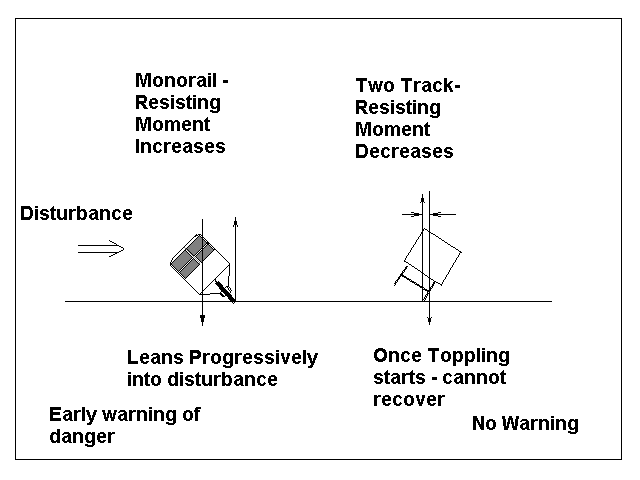
Monorail v two-rail response

Shilovsky gave a number of claimed benefits including reduced right-of-way problems because steeper gradients and sharper corners may be negotiated in theory. In his book, Shilovsky describes a form of on-track braking, which is feasible with a monorail, but would upset the directional stability of a conventional rail vehicle. This has the potential of much shorter stopping distances compared with conventional wheel on steel, with a corresponding reduction in safe separation between trains. The result is potentially higher occupancy of the track, and higher capacity.

Shilovsky claimed his designs were actually lighter than the equivalent duo-rail vehicles. The gyro mass, according to Brennan, accounts for 3–5% of the vehicle weight, which is comparable to the bogie weight saved in using a single track design.

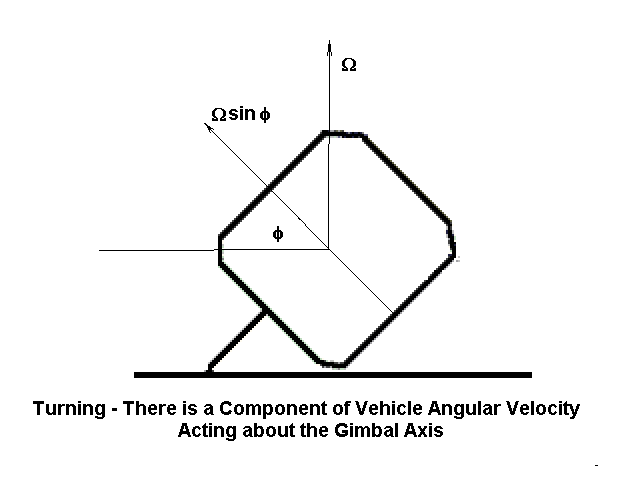
Contribution of body rotation

Considering a vehicle negotiating a horizontal curve, the most serious problems arise if the gyro axis is vertical. There is a component of turn rate $\Omega$ acting about the gimbal pivot, so that an additional gyroscopic moment is introduced into the roll equation:

$$A\frac{d^2\phi}{dt^2}+H(\frac{d\theta}{dt}+\Omega \phi)=Wh \phi$$

This displaces the roll from the correct bank angle for the turn, but more seriously, changes the constant term in the characteristic equation to:

$$\frac{(Wh-H\Omega)k}{AJ}$$

Evidently, if the turn rate exceeds a critical value:

$$\Omega=\frac{Wh}{H}$$

The balancing loop will become unstable. However, an identical gyro spinning in the opposite sense will cancel the roll torque which is causing the instability, and if it is forced to precess in the opposite direction to the first gyro will produce a control torque in the same direction.

In 1972, the Canadian Government's Division of Mechanical Engineering rejected a monorail proposal largely on the basis of this problem. Their analysis was correct, but restricted in scope to single vertical axis gyro systems, and not universal.

Gas turbine engines are designed with peripheral speeds as high as 400 metres per second (1,300 ft/s), and have operated reliably on thousands of aircraft over the past 50 years. Hence, an estimate of the gyro mass for a 10 tonnes (9.8 long tons; 11 short tons), with a center-of-gravity height of 2 metres (6 ft 7 in), assuming a peripheral speed of half what is used in jet engine design, is a mere 140 kilograms (310 lb). Brennan's recommendation of 3–5% of the vehicle mass was therefore highly conservative.

== See also ==
- Advanced Passenger Train – Experimental tilting high speed train developed by British Rail
- Adhesion railway – Railway relying on adhesion to move trains
- Bicycle and motorcycle dynamics – Science behind the motion of bicycles and motorcycles
- Gyrobus – Flywheel-powered electric bus
- Gyrocar – Self-balancing two-wheeled automobile
- Lit Motors – American cabin motorcycle developer
- Segway HT – Two-wheeled, self-balancing personal vehicle
