= Brennan Helicopter =

Experimental British helicopter

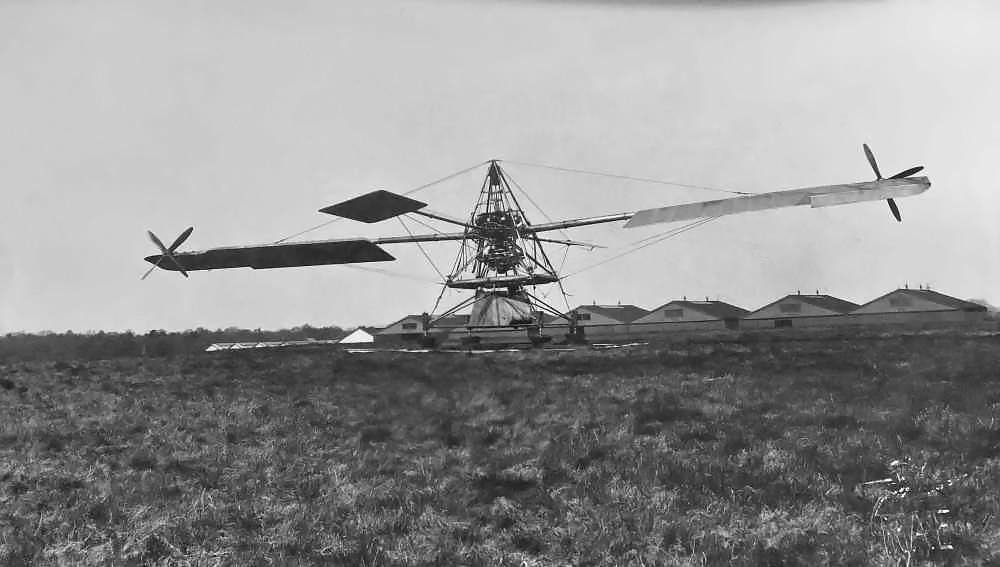
- Brennan’s helicopter at Farnborough, 1924

General information
- Type: Helicopter
- National origin: United Kingdom
- Number built: 1

History
- First flight: 1921
- Retired: 1926

The Brennan Helicopter was a British rotary wing aircraft, developed by the Irish engineer and inventor Louis Brennan between the late 1910s and the mid-1920s. The helicopter was powered by a central engine through shafts to propellers mounted on two of the rotor blades.

== Design and development ==
Louis Brennan became interested in helicopters in the 1910s. In 1916 he submitted a patent application entitled "Improvements Relating to Aerial Navigation", with that being granted to him on 10 December 1918. From 1919 to 1926 he was engaged by the Air Ministry at the Royal Aircraft Establishment, Farnborough to develop the helicopter. Though not formally named, the craft is referred to as the Brennan Helicopter.

As originally built, the helicopter featured a two-bladed rotor, and was powered by a centrally located Bentley engine which drove four-bladed pusher propellers on each blade. A pyramidal structure acted as the mount for the engine and the blades and rotated, as a single unit, around a vertical axle. Sited below that structure was a small streamlined fuselage, containing the pilot, and an undercarriage that consisted of four landing pads mounted outboard on struts. Directional control was meant to be achieved by ailerons incorporated into the outboard end of each blade.

== Operational history ==
The first tethered flights took place, inside a hangar at Farnborough, in December 1921. Stability and control tests showed that use of the ailerons on the blades was insufficient. The craft was then modified to address those issues, with a pair of smaller, auxiliary, blades being added to the rotor.

Outdoor testing commenced in May 1924, and continued till 1926. During that two year time period, the helicopter made 70 flights, consisting mostly of short hovers and transitions to horizontal flight. Flights averaged about 3 minutes in duration, with one traversing about 600 ft (180 m). The helicopter's stability and control issues were never resolved. One test flight in October 1925 ended when a rotor blade touched the ground, causing considerable damage.

The project was discontinued in 1926 when the Air Ministry withdrew funding, with them preferring to focus further rotary wing activities on craft like the Cierva autogiro.

== Specifications ==
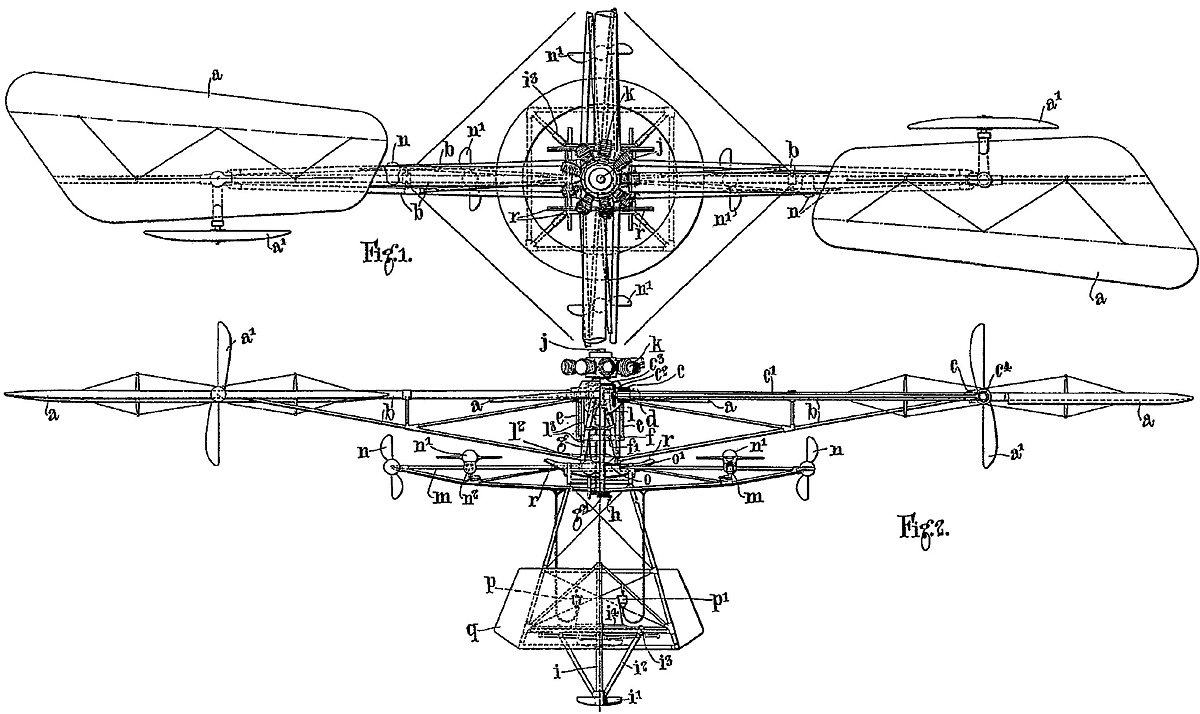
A drawing from GB patent 281,735 – “Improvements relating to Aerial Navigation”

Data from Old Machine Press

General characteristics

- Capacity: 1
- Empty weight: 2,765 lb (1,254 kg)
- Powerplant: 1 × Bentley BR2 rotary, 230 hp (170 kW)
- Main rotor diameter: 2 × 61 ft (19 m)

Performance

== See also ==
Aircraft of comparable role, configuration, and era

- Curtiss-Bleecker SX-5-1 Helicopter
- de Bothezat helicopter
- Oehmichen Helicopter
- Pescara Model 3 Helicopter
- Saunders Helicogyre
