= Fort Davis, County Cork =

Fort Davis
- Dún an Dáibhisigh
- Near Whitegate in County Cork in Ireland
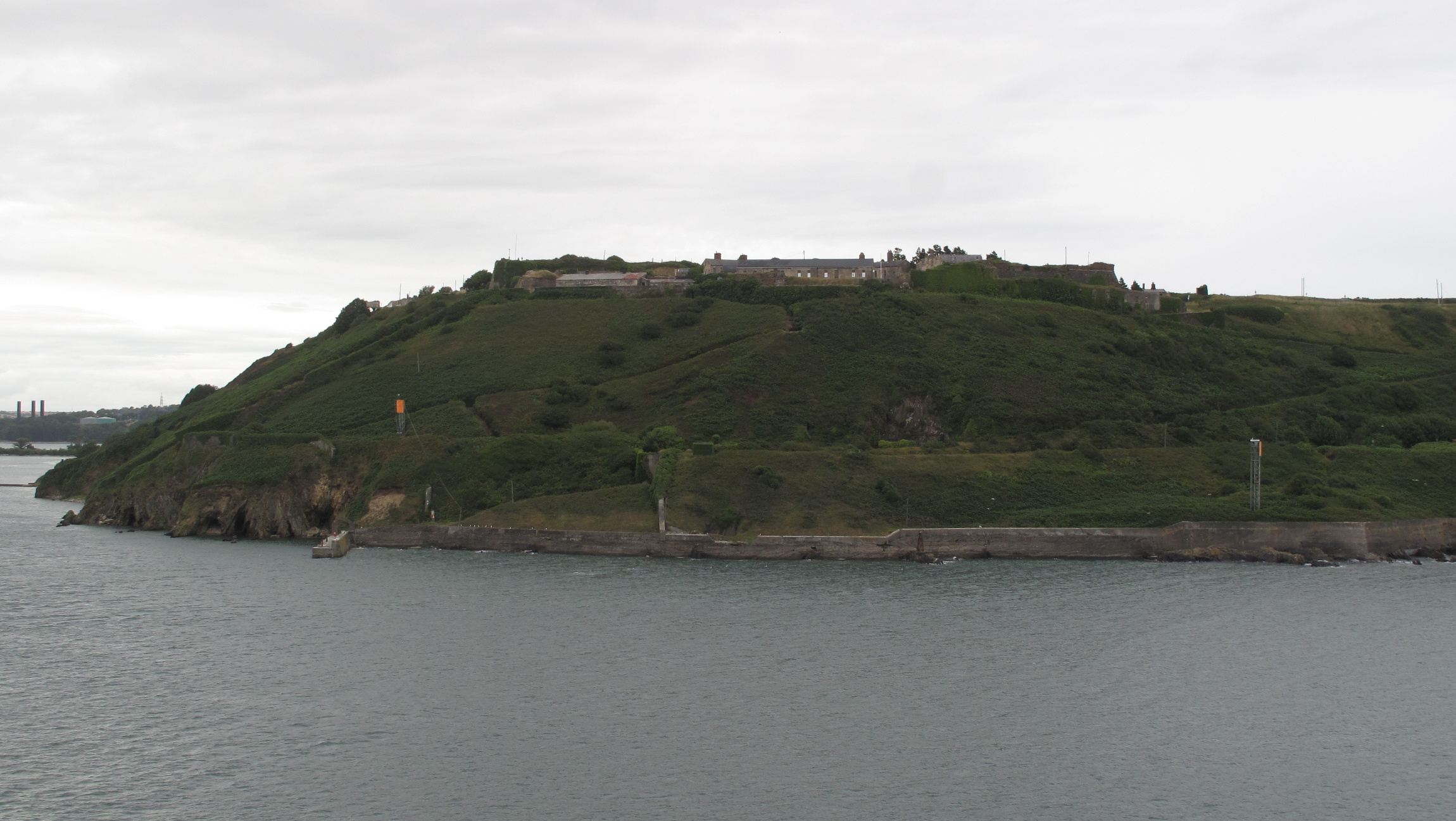
- Fort Davis viewed from Cork Harbour

Site information
- Type: Coastal defence fortification
- Owner: Department of Defence
- Open to the public: No

Location
- Coordinates: 51.816°N 8.261°W
- Area: 74 acres (30 ha)

Site history
- Built: 1607 (original castle); 1860s (significant reconstruction)
- Events: Siege of Cork (1690), Treaty Port handover (1938)

Garrison information
- Occupants: British Armed Forces, Irish Defence Forces

Fort Davis (Irish: Dún an Dáibhisigh; previously Fort Carlisle), is a coastal defence fortification close to Whitegate, County Cork, Ireland. Together with similar structures at Fort Mitchel (Spike Island), Fort Camden (Crosshaven), and Templebreedy Battery (also close to Crosshaven), the fort was built to defend the mouth of Cork Harbour. Though used as a fortification from the early 17th century, the current structures of the 74-acre site date primarily from the 1860s. Originally named Fort Carlisle and operated by the British Armed Forces, the fort was handed-over to the Irish Defence Forces in 1938, and renamed Fort Davis. The facility is owned by the Department of Defence, and is used as a military training site with no public access.

== History ==
The coastline at Whitegate, north of Roche's Point, is at a strategic position overlooking the entrance to Cork Harbour – one of the world's largest natural harbours, and historically of defensive and naval importance to Ireland and the region. One of the earliest documented fortifications at this point was built prior to 1607, and came to be known as "Prince Rupert's Tower" (for Prince Rupert of the Rhine). By the period of the Williamite War (1689–1691) additional coastal defence fortifications were in place on the site, and known as "King John's Fort" (for John, King of England). Together with Fort Camden, this fort fell to Williamite forces under the Duke of Marlborough in the lead-up to the Siege of Cork (1690). Additional construction works were undertaken from the 1790s, and some of these tunnels and structures were used during the Napoleonic Wars (1803–1815) to house French prisoners of war.

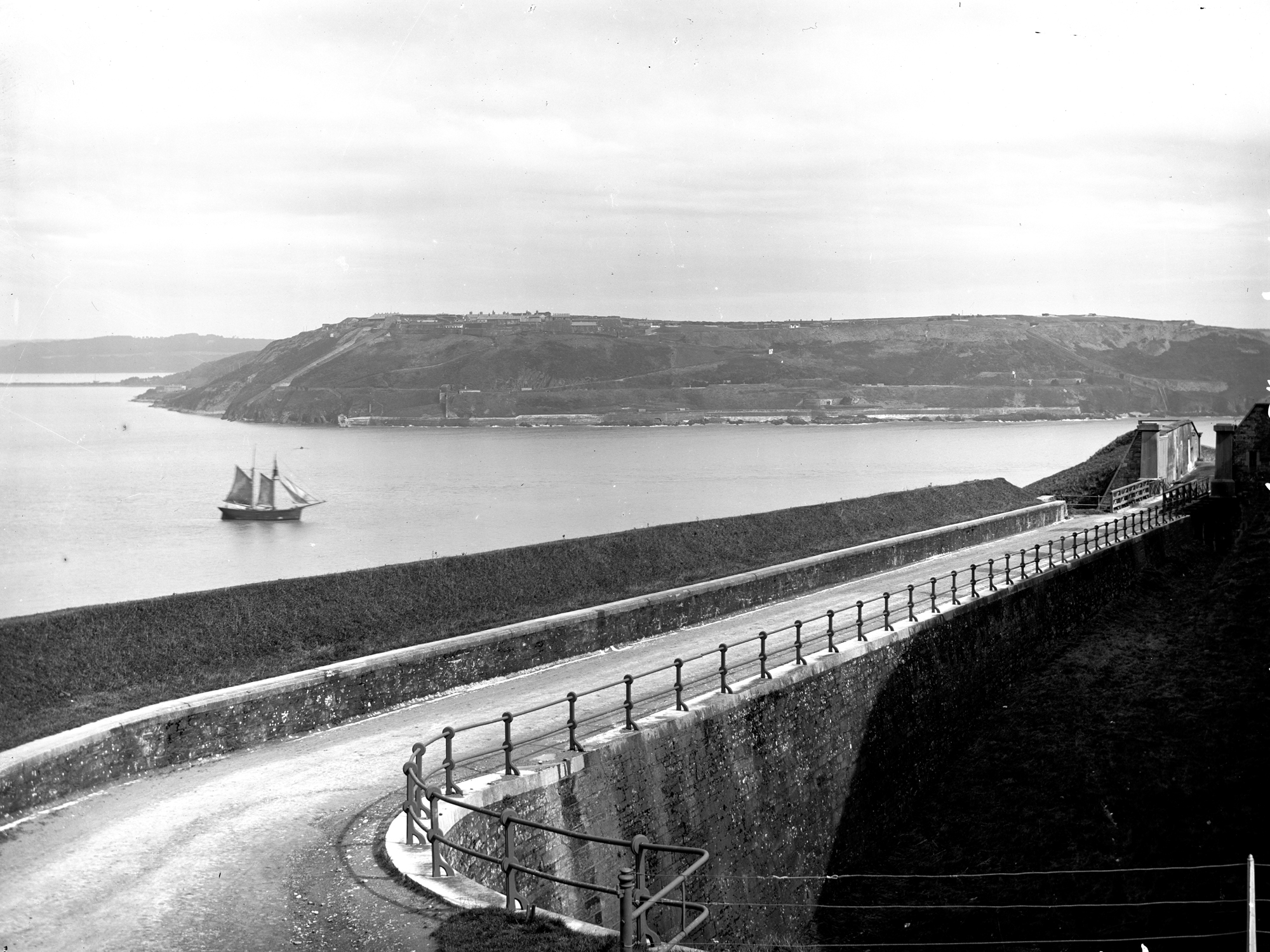
Fort Davis (then called Fort Carlisle) as pictured in the late 19th century from the companion defences at Fort Meagher (then Fort Camden)

By the mid-19th century the defences had been renamed to Fort Carlisle (for Frederick Howard, 5th Earl of Carlisle a previous Lord Lieutenant of Ireland). In the 1850s, a Royal Commission gave renewed consideration to the strategic importance of the harbour, and proposed enhancements to the defences at Fort Mitchel (Spike Island), Fort Camden (Crosshaven), and Fort Carlisle. During the 1860s Fort Carlisle was therefore redeveloped along the lines of other "Palmerston Forts" in the region. Some of this development took advantage of 19th century advancements in the use of concrete.

During the First World War (1914–1918), the harbour was used as a naval base to cover the "Western Approaches", and Fort Davis was used to complement the defences of Fort Camden on the opposite side of the harbour entrance. Royal Garrison Artillery Coastal Defence units were stationed in the fort at this time. The fort did not see significant action during the Irish War of Independence – although a number of graves in the fort's military cemetery date from this period. Following the war, under the Anglo-Irish Treaty, the harbour defences remained in the control of British government. These Treaty Port installations, including Fort Carlisle, were handed-over to the Irish authorities in 1938. The fort was renamed Fort Davis for Thomas Davis – who was the chief organiser of the Young Ireland movement. (Similarly, "Fort Westmoreland" on Spike Island was renamed "Fort Mitchel", and "Fort Camden" near Crosshaven was renamed "Fort Meagher").

During "the Emergency" (1939–1945), elements of the Coastal Defence Artillery (CDA) of the Irish Artillery Corps operated from the fort. By the mid- to late-20th century the CDA was merged into other artillery regiments of the Irish Army, and the fort primarily used as a training site. The site remains in the ownership of the Department of Defence and is used by the Irish Army for exercises, ceremonial "gun salutes" and other training purposes.

== Layout ==
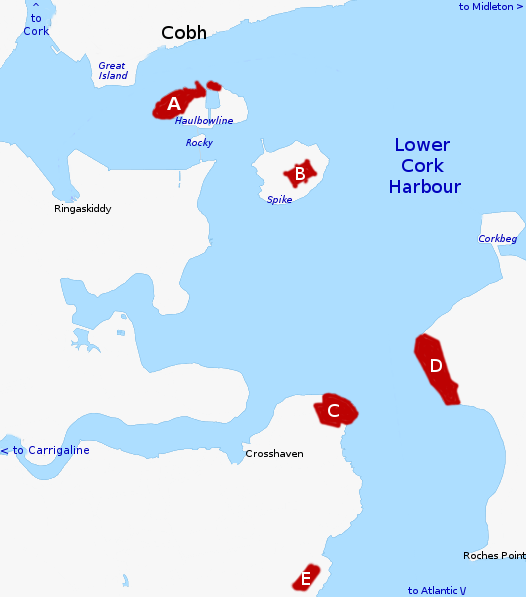
Plan of lower harbour showing location relative to other installations: (A) Haulbowline Naval Base, (B) Fort Mitchel/Westmoreland, (C) Fort Meagher/Camden, (D) Fort Davis/Carlisle, (E) Fort Templebreedy

The features of the fort date primarily to developments in the 19th century, when – at peak – the fort had upwards of 20 guns.

On the landward side, a dry-moat, ramparts, terreplein, caponier and flanking batteries defended the approaches. The dry-moat is 30 feet (9.1 m) deep and 40 feet (12 m) wide at points, and was originally crossed by a drawbridge. The star shaped landward defences included three musketry caponiers, and a simple terreplein with movable guns.

On the seaward side, land batteries were trained on the harbour from eight gun emplacements. These batteries were built with a number of underground shelters, vaulted magazines, and linked in places by bunkered tunnels. Though changed over time, the batteries were originally constructed to include:

- Main emplacement – Dating from the Napoleonic era, this is triangular in layout with one full bastion, two demi-bastions and one semi-circular bastion
- Number 1 battery – As with several of the fort's other batteries, this dates from the Victorian reconstruction. Originally it had Moncrieff mountings for four RML 7 inch guns (later reconstructed for three QF 12-pounder guns)
- Number 2 battery – Casemated with shields for two RML 10 inch guns
- Number 3 battery – Moncrieff mountings for four RML 7 inch guns
- Number 4 battery – Casemated for four RML 10 inch guns (later converted to an oil store)
- North Battery – Two BL 6 inch coastal defence guns
- Rupert's Tower Battery – Two RML 12 inch guns (later rebuilt for two BL 6-inch Mk VII guns)
- South Battery – Two BL 9.2 inch guns

Other features of the fort include a military cemetery, a waterfront pier for sea-borne access, and a number of over-ground barracks and support buildings.

Evidence of torpedo defences were discovered at the fort during clearing works in 2015.

== See also ==
- List of Irish military installations
