= Spike Island, County Cork =

Island in County Cork, Ireland

Spike Island
Native name: Inis Pic
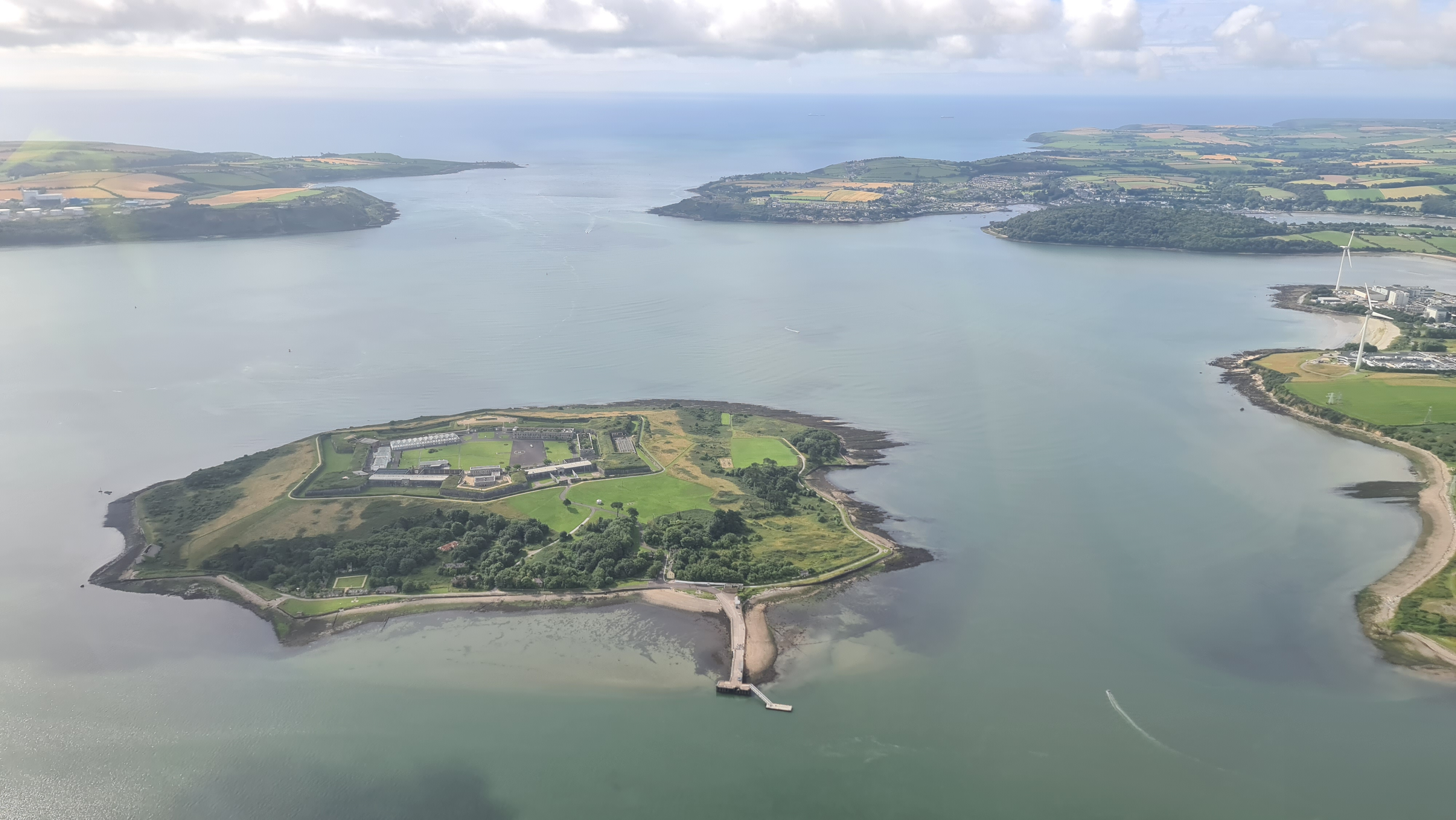
- Aerial view of Spike Island (2023)

- Location within County Cork

Geography
- Location: Cork Harbour
- Coordinates: 51°50′06″N 08°17′06″W
- Area: 0.41 km^{2} (0.16 sq mi)
- Length: 0.8 km (0.5 mi)
- Width: 0.5 km (0.31 mi)

Administration
- Ireland
- County: County Cork

Additional information
- Official website: www.spikeislandcork.ie

Spike Island (Irish: Inis Píc) is an island of 103 acres (42 ha) in Cork Harbour, Ireland. Originally the site of a monastic settlement, the island is dominated by an 18th-century bastion fort now named Fort Mitchel.

The island's strategic location within the harbour meant it was used at times for defence and as a prison. Since the early 21st century the island has been developed as a heritage tourist attraction, with €5.5 million investment in exhibition and visitor spaces and accompanying tourism marketing. There were in excess of 81,000 visitors to the island during 2019, a 21% increase on 2018 numbers. Spike Island was named top European tourist attraction at the 2017 World Travel Awards.

== History ==
=== Early history ===
The principal evidence for a monastic foundation on Spike Island comes from Archdall's Monasticon Hibernicum, which states that Saint Mochuda founded a monastery there in the 7th century. A grant to Saint Thomas's Abbey in Dublin in 1178 of the Church of Saint Rusien on Spike Island may lend credence to a monastic settlement, as the name and date both indicate a Celtic foundation. The ruins of a church were reported to exist on Spike Island in 1774.

=== Ownership ===
The grant to St Thomas's abbey in 1178 coincides with the surrender of lands, including Spike Island, by Diarmid McCarthy King of Desmond to the Normans. In 1182, one Raymond Mangunel was granted or "enfeoffed" Spike Island. There are no further recorded changes in ownership until 1427. In this year, records suggest that William, son of John Reych, granted to John Pyke, amongst other lands and premises, the lands of Innyspyge, in the Comte Cork. In 1490, Thomas Pyke granted to Maurice Ronan of Kinsale, his holdings in Spike Island. In the 17th century, the island was in the possession of the Roche and Galwey families until the rebellion of 1641, when these families forfeited possession of the island. Although this forfeiture was reversed on the accession of King Charles II of England in 1660, they did not regain possession.

In 1698, the island was in the possession of Arnold Joost van Keppel, 1st Earl of Albemarle, who had accompanied William of Orange to England in 1688. In 1698, he conveyed the island to William Smith of Ballymore on the Great Island. In the 1770s, the island was in the hands of Nicholas Fitton. It would seem that the government leased part of the island for fortifications in the 1770s while the owner remained in residence, the house only being demolished during the construction of the present fort. Eventually, the entire island was rented.

=== Military use and fortification ===
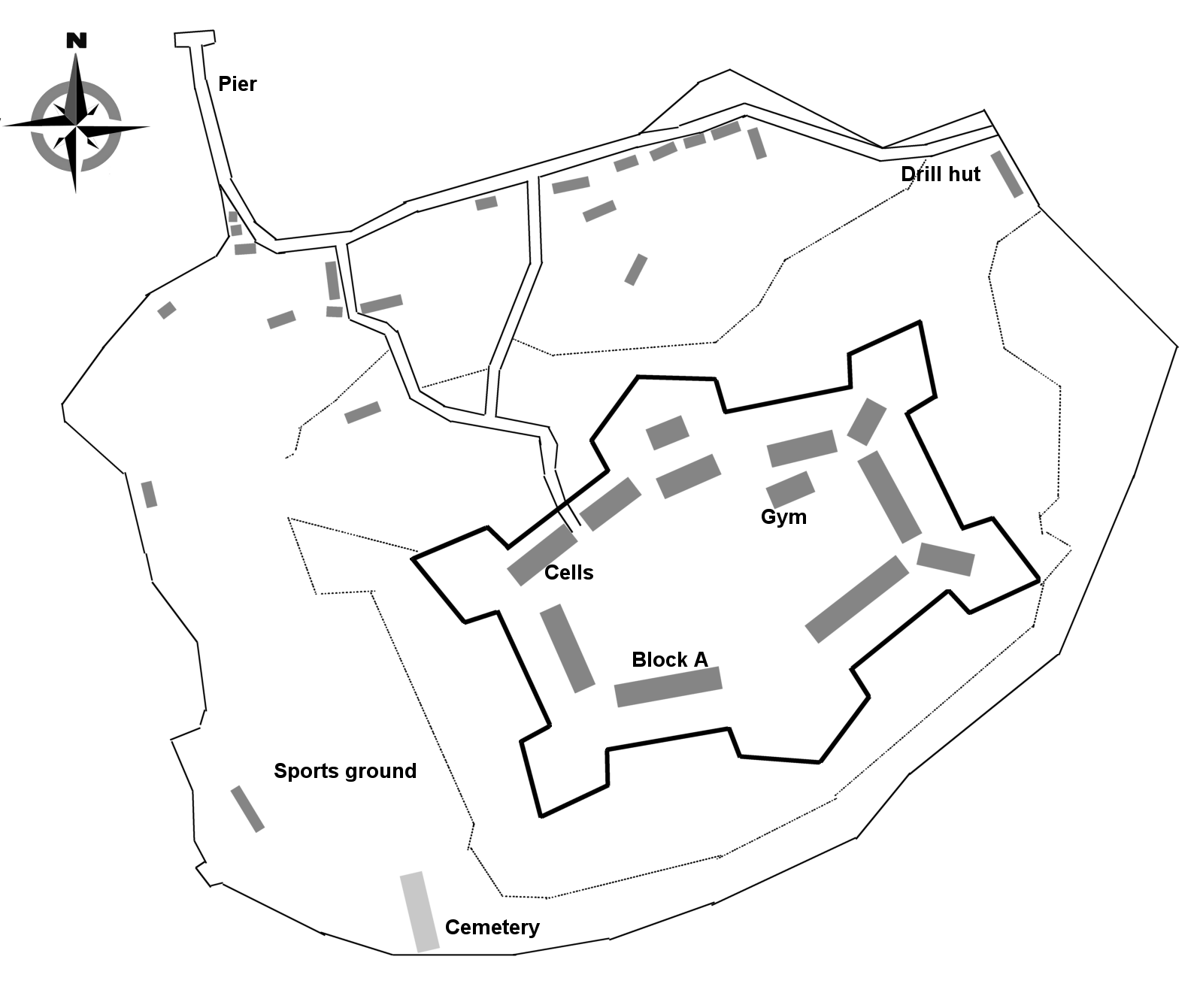
Plan of Spike Island

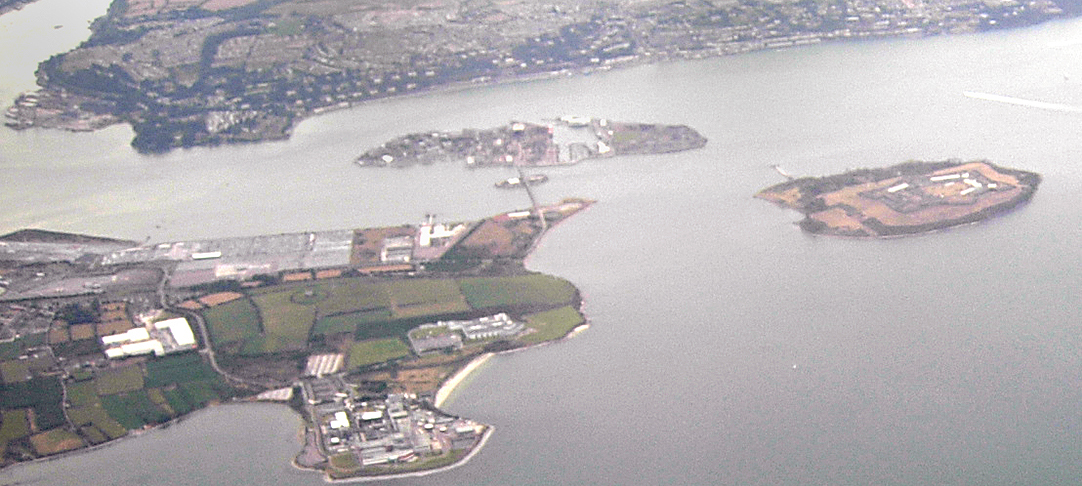
Spike Island (right) is to the southeast of Haulbowline island (middle rearground) and south of Great Island (rearground) within lower Cork Harbour

It was possibly used by smugglers for a time, and a map of circa 1600 clearly shows some form of fortified tower on the island similar to a depiction of Belvelly Castle on the Great Island also shown. The island's location at the entrance to Cork Harbour meant that the island held strategic importance. It was a significant site in the French intervention following the Glorious Revolution (1689).

==== Temporary fortification ====
The first artillery fortification on the island was built in 1779. Its construction was prompted by the outbreak of the American Revolution in 1775, and in particular by the entry of France (1778) and Spain (1779) into the war on the American side. Cork Harbour was used as an assembly point for convoys to the Americas and at one point more than 400 vessels were assembled in the harbour. Additionally, Cork was a source of supplies for the British forces operating in the West Indies and North America. There was, therefore, a need to protect the harbour from potential attackers. The Spike Island Battery was a temporary work and armed with eighteen 24 pounder cannon moved from Cobh Fort. After the Treaty of Paris ended the war in 1783, this temporary work was demolished.

==== Fort Westmorland ====
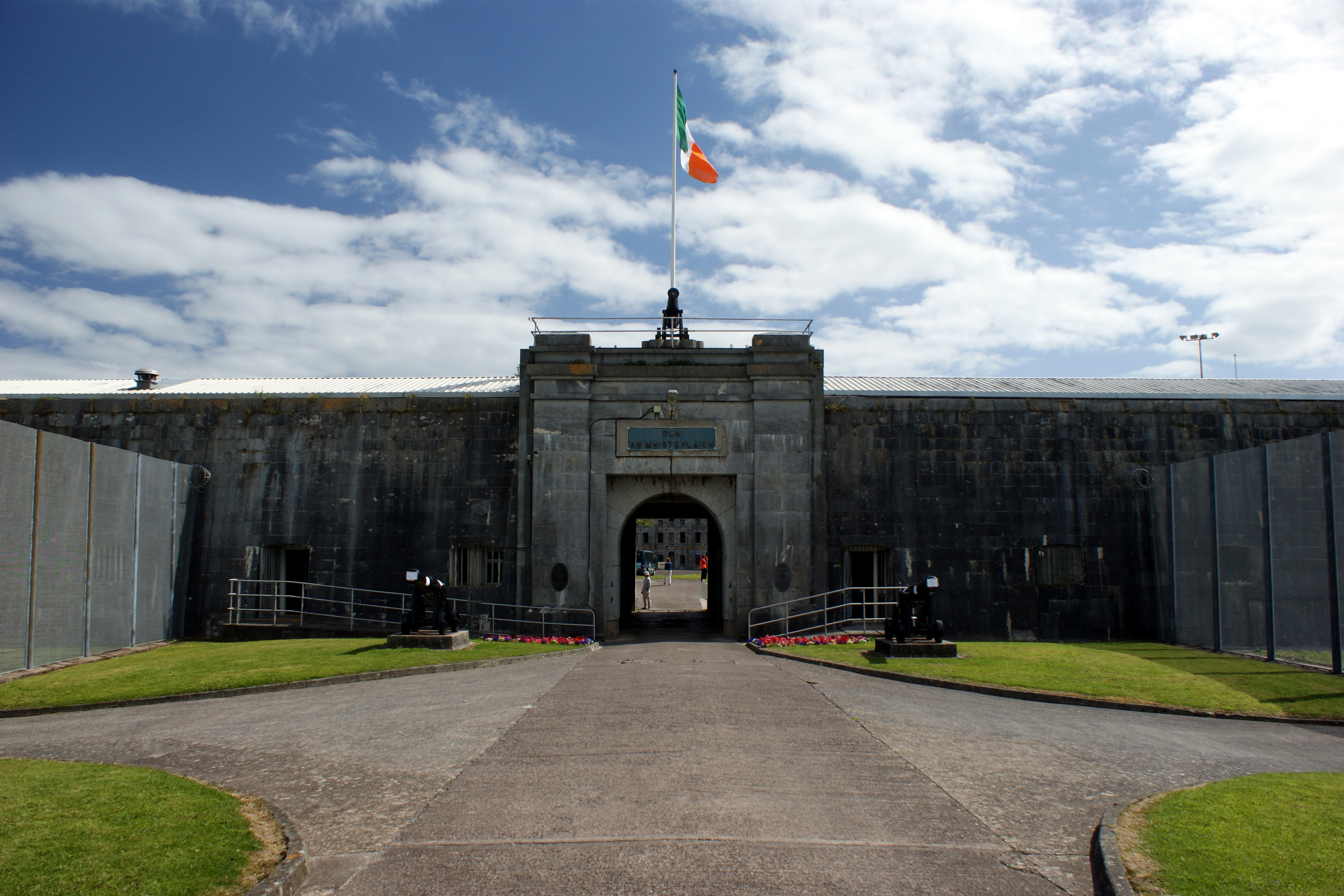
Gates of Fort Mitchel (Fort Westmorland)

In 1789, Colonel Charles Vallancey of the Corps of Irish Engineers, who had been made responsible for the fortification of the harbour during the American war, persuaded the then Lord Lieutenant John Fane, 10th Earl of Westmorland to allow the construction of a permanent fortification on Spike Island. This work was undertaken by the Irish Board of Ordnance. In October 1790, the Earl visited the island and named the incomplete structure Fort Westmorland. In 1793, France declared war on Britain and a conflict began which, with one interlude, occupied the next two decades.

In 1794, on the departure of Westmorland, his successor as Lord Lieutenant, likely William Fitzwilliam, 4th Earl Fitzwilliam, halted construction of Fort Westmorland. Eventually, Vallancey was allowed to continue but the fort was still incomplete in 1797. It was, however, completed by 1802, as a plan of that date shows. By 1800, this fort was armed with three 13-inch, two 10-inch, two 8-inch and six 5.5-inch mortars, 29 24-pounder guns, two 12-pounder guns and twelve 6-pounder cannon. Also included were two 6-pounder field guns and two 5.5-inch howitzers.

==== New fortress ====
The defences of Cork Harbour faced two threats. Firstly an attack by warships forcing entry into the harbour, either in a raid to destroy shipping or to effect a landing of troops. Secondly they faced the threat of attack from the land by forces which had been landed at an undefended point along the coast. Just such a landing had been attempted by the French at Bantry Bay in 1796 with a force of 15,000 men. While unsuccessful, the attempt greatly alarmed the military. Vallancey was of the belief that had the French actually landed, they would have taken the Cork Harbour forts, including Fort Westmoreland.

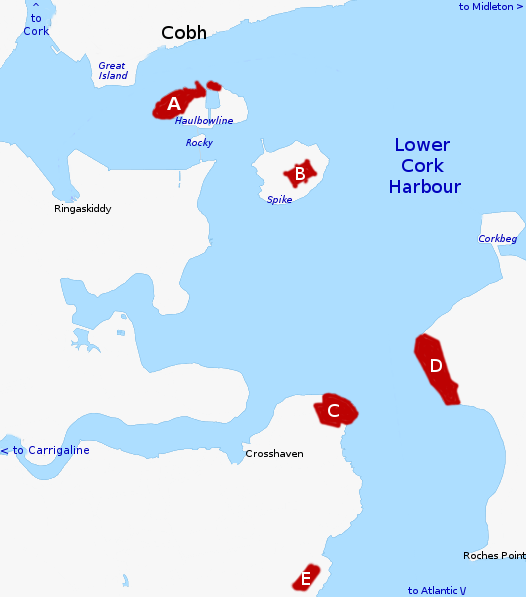
Plan of lower harbour showing location relative to other installations: (A) Haulbowline Naval Base, (B) Fort Mitchel/Westmoreland, (C) Fort Meagher/Camden, (D) Fort Davis/Carlisle, (E) Fort Templebreedy

In 1802, General John Hope, 4th Earl of Hopetoun, recommended that a major fortress be constructed on Spike Island, capable of holding 2,000 to 3,000 men. He considered Spike Island was "the true point of defence" for Cork Harbour. Lieutenant General David Dundas was consulted by the Duke of York, Commander in Chief, who also recommended that a fortress should be erected on Spike Island. William Twiss of the Royal Engineers concurred.

In 1801, the Acts of Union came into force and responsibility for fortifications in Ireland passed from the Irish Board of Ordnance, which was abolished, to the Board of Ordnance in London. It was the job of this board to implement the decision to erect the fortress and it fell to Charles Holloway, Commanding Engineer Cork District, to begin the works. In 1804, the Hampshire Chronicle reported that the overall height of Spike island had been reduced by 25 feet and the spoil used as infill to create a level foundation. The same paper reported that, on 6 June 1804, General Sir Eyre Coote had laid the foundation stone of the new fortress.

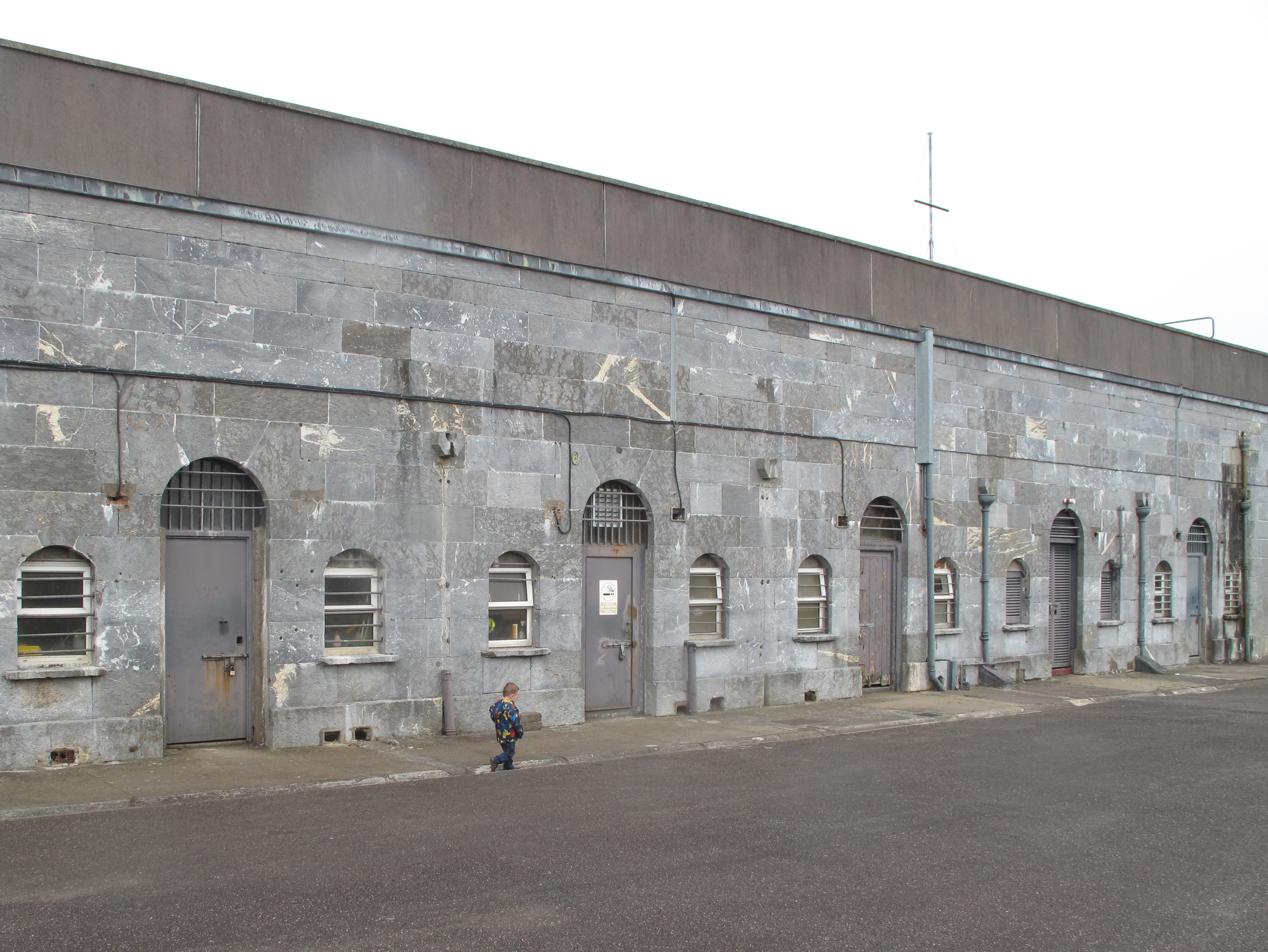
North-western accommodation block, later used as a prison

Two alternative proposals had been made for accommodation within the fort. One envisaged six barrack blocks, one of which was actually constructed in the fort, this being the officers mess block, The ground floor of these blocks consisted of a series of bombproof brick vaulted rooms. The first floor was slate-roofed and open to destruction in the event of a bombardment. The second proposal was for six sets of bombproof casemates set into the ramparts. Two such sets of casemates were actually constructed, these being the north-east and north-west casemates. The second accommodation block to be constructed, the A Block, shows a divergence from the original plan in that the bombproofing is incorporated into the roof. The ground floor of a third block, the B Block, was intended to follow the design of the A block, was erected before the first phase of construction ended (circa 1817). The four magazines were also constructed around this time. A large workforce was employed in the construction, and included both troops and civilian workmen.

=== Later use ===
Later a prison and convict depot, the island was used to house convicts prior to penal transportation. Opened in 1847 to deal with growing number of convictions for theft during the Great Famine, the prison grew into what "for a few years in the mid-19th century [..] was probably [..] the biggest prison in the British Empire". It later gained a reputation as "Ireland's Alcatraz".

Spike Island was home to Ellen (Nellie) Organ who gained special permission to take First Communion shortly before her death at the age of 4. On hearing her story, the pope lowered the age at which communion could be taken, from 12 to 7.

The island remained in use as a garrison and prison through the Irish War of Independence, when IRA prisoners were held there. Richard Barrett was among those detained there, but escaped during the truce of 1921. Over 1400 men were held on the island at its peak until the signing of the Anglo-Irish Treaty. On 6 December 1921, the Anglo-Irish Treaty was concluded. It provided for the establishment of the Irish Free State which happened on 6 December 1922. The Treaty included provisions by which the British would retain sovereignty over three strategically important ports known as the Treaty ports, one of which is described in the Treaty as:

Queenstown (b) Harbour defences to remain in charge of British care and maintenance parties. Certain mooring buoys to be retained for use of His Majesty's ships.

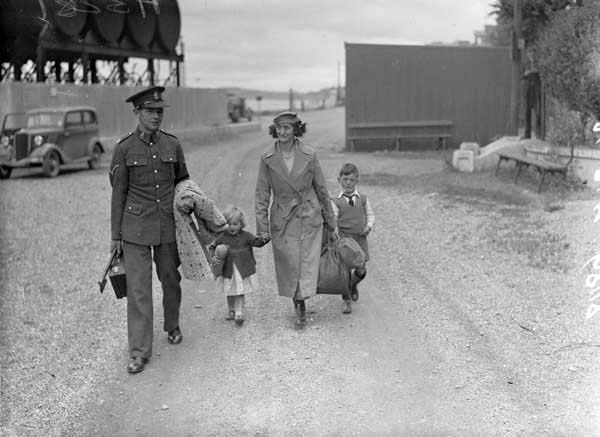
A member of the British Army (with family) departing following the cession of Spike Island (July 1938)

Accordingly, even after the establishment of the Irish Free State, the Royal Navy continued to maintain its presence at Spike Island. Spike Island remained under British sovereignty until 11 July 1938 when pursuant to the Anglo-Irish Trade Agreement of 25 April 1938, the territory was ceded to Ireland. The handover ceremonies were attended by senior military and political figures, including Éamon de Valera and Frank Aiken.

=== History since handover ===
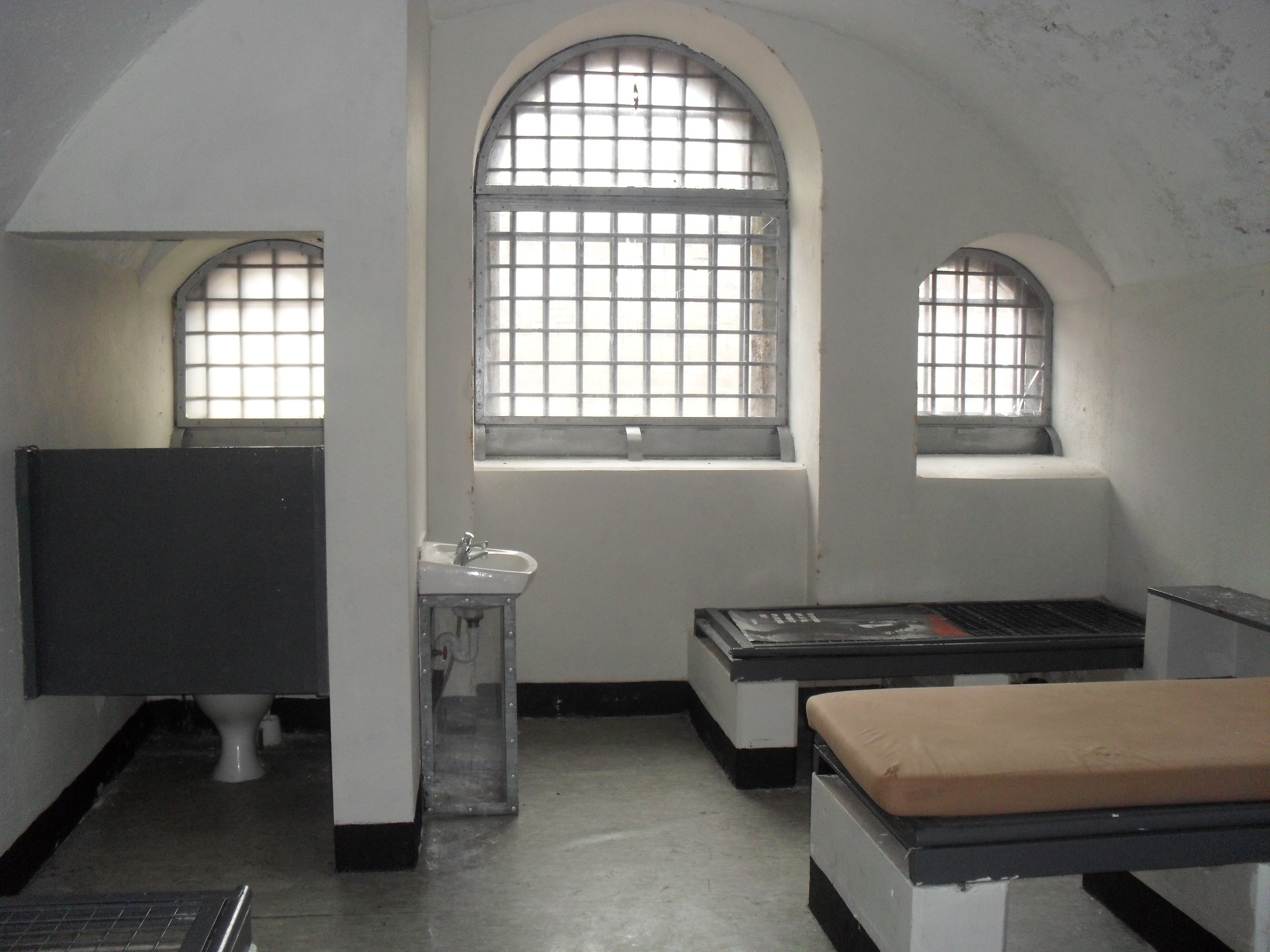
Cell in the "young offenders" prison, closed in 2004.

Following its handover to Ireland, the island's installations were renamed Fort Mitchel - after John Mitchel, nationalist activist and political journalist who was held on the island for a time. (Similar Treaty Port fortifications at Fort Camden and Fort Carlisle were similarly renamed to Fort Meagher and Fort Davis respectively.)

The island remained the site of a prison and military base (for the regular Irish Army, the FCÁ and later the Navy) for some time. Late into the 20th century, it was used as a youth correctional facility. On 1 September 1985 inmates rioted and, as a subsequent Dáil committee reported, "civilians, prison officers and the Gardaí on the Island were virtual prisoners of the criminals". During the riot, one of the accommodation blocks, Block A, caught fire and is known as the Burnt Block. This prison facility closed in 2004.

The island also had a small civilian population; a small school, church and ferry (launch) service to Cobh served the population. The civilian population has since left the island.

== Demographics ==
Historical population

| Year | Pop. | ±% |
|---|---|---|
| 1841 | 202 | — |
| 1851 | 2,323 | +1050.0% |
| 1861 | 1,139 | −51.0% |
| 1871 | 1,310 | +15.0% |
| 1881 | 1,072 | −18.2% |
| 1891 | 735 | −31.4% |
| 1901 | 580 | −21.1% |
| 1911 | 617 | +6.4% |

| Year | Pop. | ±% |
|---|---|---|
| 1926 | 442 | −28.4% |
| 1936 | 430 | −2.7% |
| 1946 | 218 | −49.3% |
| 1951 | 299 | +37.2% |
| 1956 | 259 | −13.4% |
| 1961 | 194 | −25.1% |
| 1966 | 199 | +2.6% |
| 1971 | 185 | −7.0% |

| Year | Pop. | ±% |
|---|---|---|
| 1979 | 103 | −44.3% |
| 1981 | 130 | +26.2% |
| 1986 | 60 | −53.8% |
| 1991 | 113 | +88.3% |
| 1996 | 103 | −8.8% |
| 2002 | 61 | −40.8% |
| 2006 | 0 | −100.0% |

Source: Central Statistics Office. "CNA17: Population by Off Shore Island, Sex and Year". CSO.ie.

== Tourism development ==
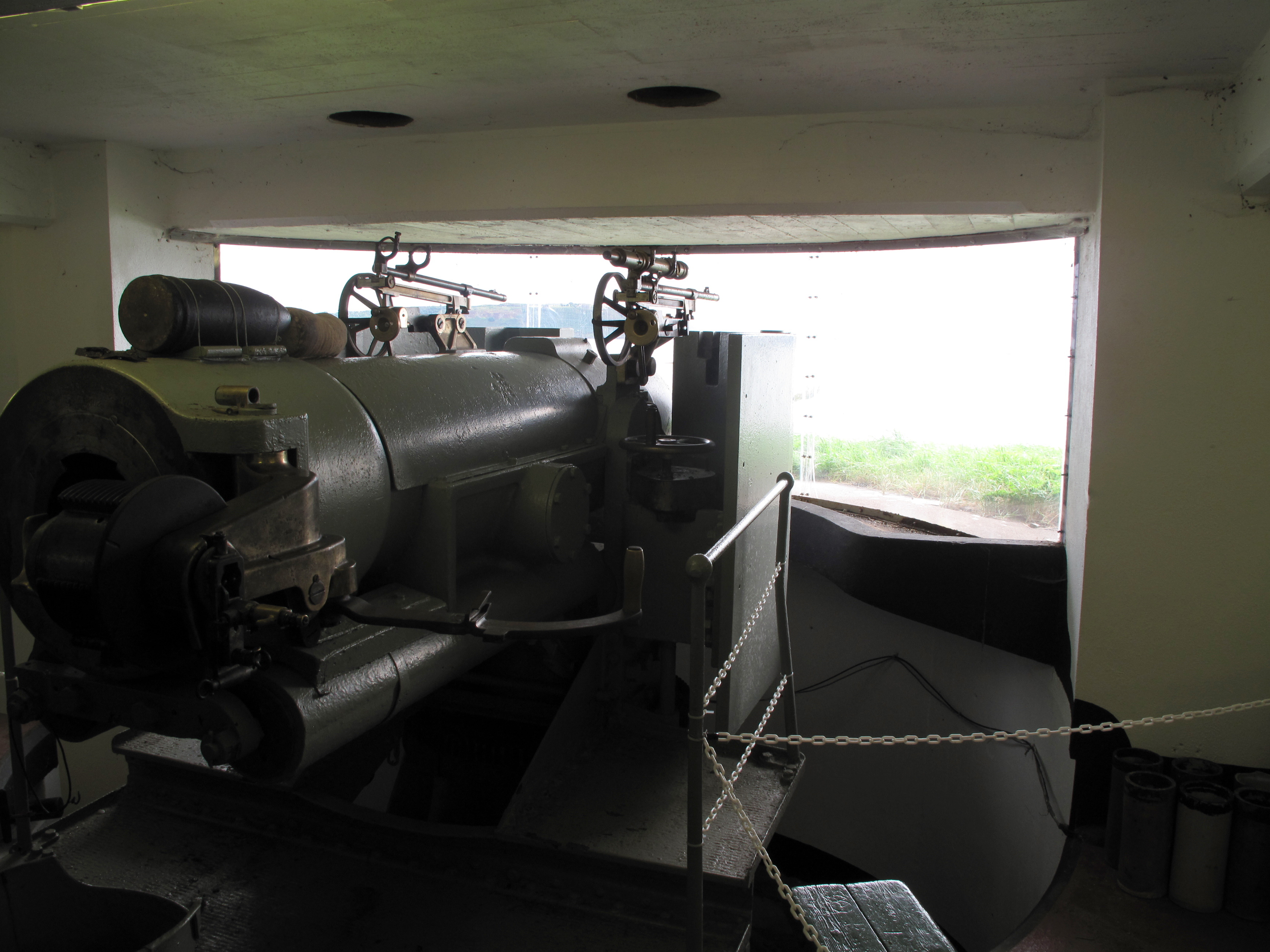
Six inch coastal defence gun in casemate in the fort

In May 2006, the then Minister for Justice, Michael McDowell, announced plans to build a new prison on the island. However, in January 2007, it was decided to explore an alternative site for the new prison, and a local task group was set up to re-open Spike Island as a historical tourist site. In 2009, it was announced that ownership of the island would be transferred, free of charge, to Cork County Council to enable its development as a tourist attraction. The Council formed a steering group to explore how Spike Island might be developed as a tourist site, and the Council subsequently licensed operators to give guided tours of the island.

Since 2015, tours depart from Cobh during the summer, taking in the fort, prison cells, gun emplacements, and key points of interest. Following additional €5.5m investment by Cork County Council, and Fáilte Ireland, additional attractions and facilities were opened for the summer 2016 season. As well as the previously opened buildings and 6-inch gun emplacements, as of summer 2016, visitors to the "Fortress Spike Island" cultural heritage attraction can also tour the "punishment block", the 1980s cells (which include an exhibition on the 1985 Spike Island riot), the recreation of the hull of a "transportation ship", and an interpretative installation on John Mitchel, for whom the fort is named.

In September 2017, at the World Travel Awards, Spike Island was named "Europe's Leading Tourist Attraction".
