= Camden Fort Meagher =

Coastal defence fort in County Cork, Ireland

- Near Crosshaven in County Cork in Ireland
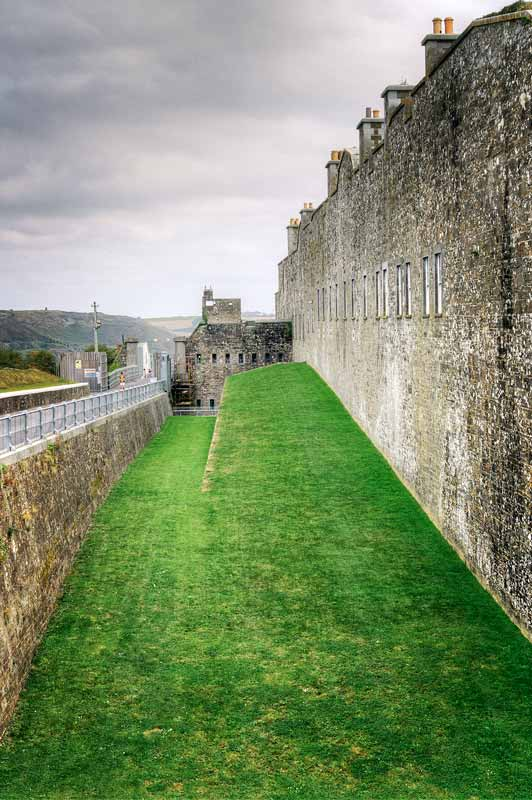
- Landward wall and moat of Fort Camden

Site information
- Type: Coastal defence fortification
- Owner: Cork County Council
- Open to the public: Yes (seasonal, weekends)
- Condition: Largely restored
- Website: Camdenfortmeagher.ie

Location
- Coordinates: 51.808°N 8.279°W

Site history
- Built: 1550 (original structure); 1860s (significant reconstruction)
- In use: 1980s (demilitarisation)
- Events: Siege of Kinsale (1601); Williamite War in Ireland (1690); Brennan torpedo installation (1891); Treaty Port handover (1938)

Garrison information
- Occupants: British Armed Forces, Irish Defence Forces

Camden Fort Meagher is a coastal defence fortification close to Crosshaven, County Cork, Ireland. Together with similar structures at Fort Mitchell (Spike Island), Fort Davis (Whitegate), and Templebreedy Battery (also close to Crosshaven), the fort was built to defend the mouth of Cork Harbour. Though originally constructed in the 16th century, the current structures of the fort date to the 1860s. Originally named Fort Camden and operated by the British Armed Forces, the fort (along with other Treaty Port installations) was handed-over to the Irish Defence Forces in 1938. Renamed Fort Meagher in honour of Thomas Francis Meagher, it remained an Irish military installation until 1989 when the Irish Army handed the fort over to Cork County Council. It remained largely overgrown until 2010 when a group of local volunteers began restoration and development of the fort for heritage and tourism purposes. The fort was renamed Camden Fort Meagher and is now open seasonally to visitors, with exhibits on the fort's Brennan torpedo installation (the world's first "practical guided weapon").

== History ==
The headland known as Ram's Head overlooks the entrance to Cork Harbour – one of the world's largest natural harbours, and historically of strategic defensive and naval importance to Ireland and the region. The first harbour defences built at Ram's Head date from 1550 and were originally known as "James' Battery". This fortification was extended in 1600, but fell into disuse after the Nine Years' War. The fort was reinforced in 1690 to defend Cork Harbour during the Williamite War in Ireland, but a party secretly came ashore and took the fort in an overland assault. The ports at Cork and Kinsale were later captured by forces under John Churchill, 1st Earl of Marlborough (later created, in 1702, the 1st Duke of Marlborough), a Williamite commander.

By the Napoleonic War (1779) the defences were known as the "Ram's Head Battery", and upgraded and remodelled to complement other installations at Haulbowline, Spike Island (Fort Westmoreland/Mitchell) and Whitegate (Fort Carlisle/Davis). In 1795 these fortifications were named "Fort Camden" in honour of John Pratt, 2nd Earl Camden, then Lord Lieutenant of Ireland.

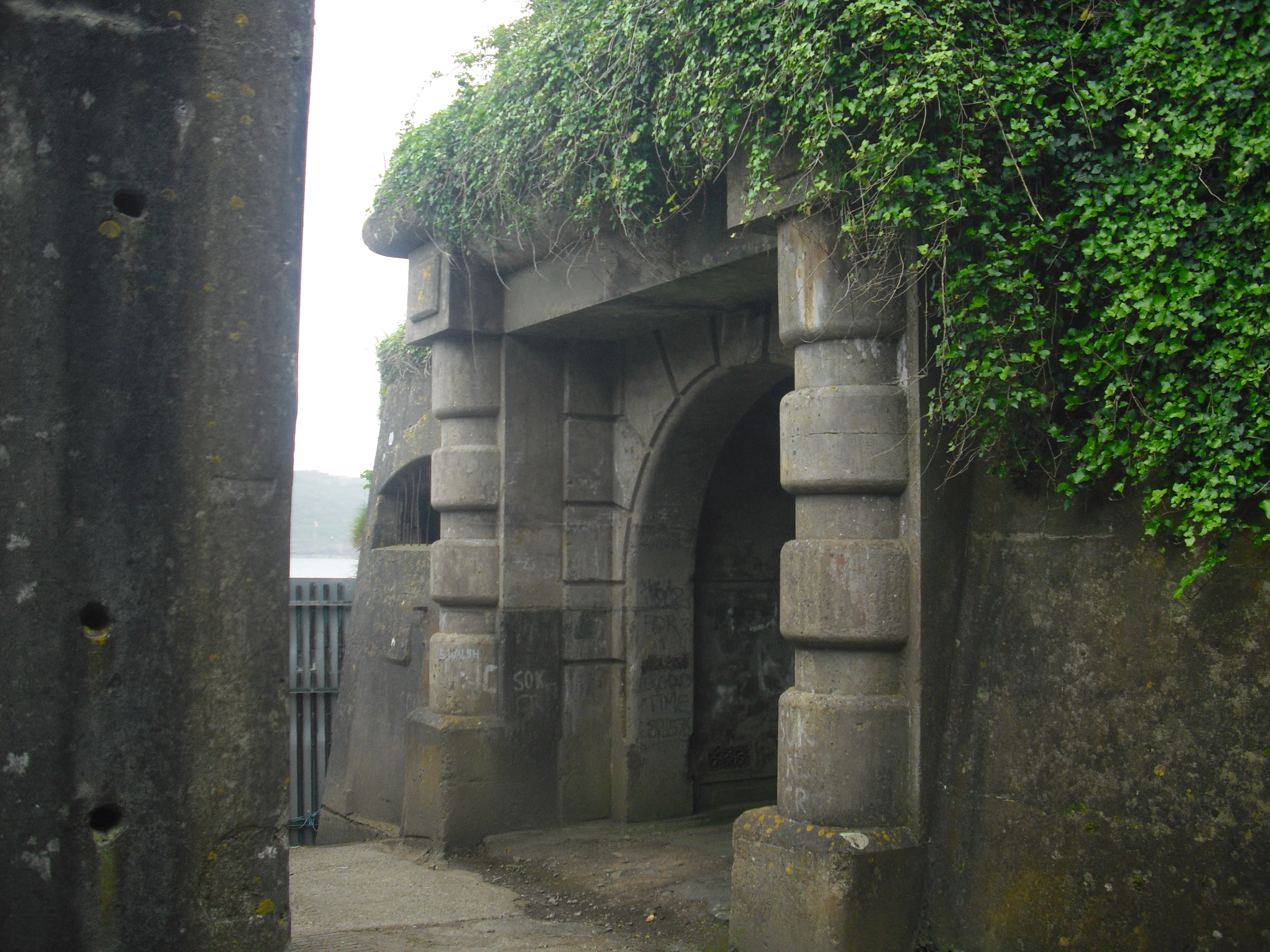
Gateway from pier area to lower courtyard

By the 1830s, Fort Camden had been reduced to a token force, and the fort was briefly repurposed as a prison. However, a Royal Commission in the 1850s gave renewed consideration to the strategic importance of the harbour, and proposed enhancements to landward defences and seaward gun batteries. This construction work started in 1861, using convict, military and civilian labour. The fort was extended during these works, with many of the site's structures being constructed underground. The current structures of the fort are attributable primarily to these works.

In the 1880s and 1890s, the guns were upgraded with breech-loading rifled guns, newer larger cannons were installed, a minefield was laid across the channel and a launching position was added for the "world's first practical guided weapon", the "Brennan Torpedo".

During the First World War, the harbour was used as a naval base to cover the "Western Approaches", an anti-submarine net was added and further upgrades were applied to harbour defences. After the Irish War of Independence, under the Anglo-Irish Treaty the harbour defences remained in the control of the British government. These Treaty Port installations, including Fort Camden, were handed over to the Irish authorities in July 1938.

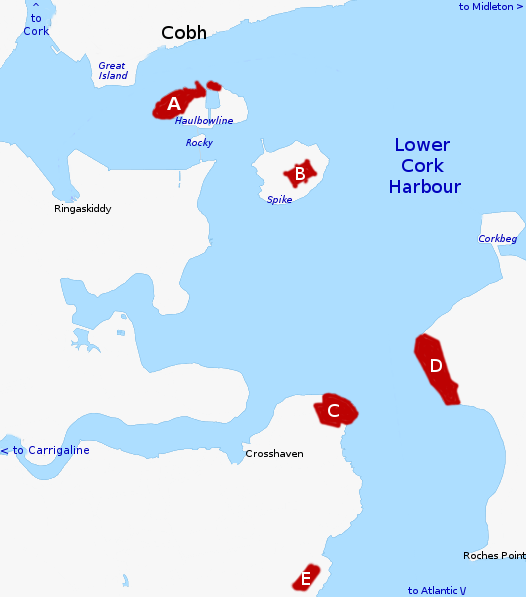
Plan of lower harbour showing location relative to other installations: (A) Haulbowline Naval Base, (B) Fort Mitchel/Westmoreland, (C) Fort Meagher/Camden, (D) Fort Davis/Carlisle, (E) Fort Templebreedy

During "the Emergency" (1939–1945), elements of the Coastal Defence Artillery (CDA) of the Irish Artillery Corps operated from the fort and the nearby Templebreedy Battery.

The fort was later renamed "Fort Meagher" for Thomas Francis Meagher – who had fought in the Young Irelander Rebellion of 1848. (Similarly, "Fort Westmoreland" on Spike Island was renamed "Fort Mitchell", and "Fort Carlisle" at Whitegate was renamed "Fort Davis").

By the mid-to-late-20th century, the CDA was merged into other artillery regiments of the Irish Army, and the fort was used primarily for the training of Civil Defence and Reserve Defence Forces. In the 1980s the army handed over the fort to the local civil administration authority, Cork County Council. The facility remained disused, however, and became overgrown and derelict in the following decades. In 2010 Cork County Council afforded a lease to community members from Crosshaven, who instrumented a volunteer campaign to clear and redevelop the fort as a heritage tourism site.

== Tourism development ==
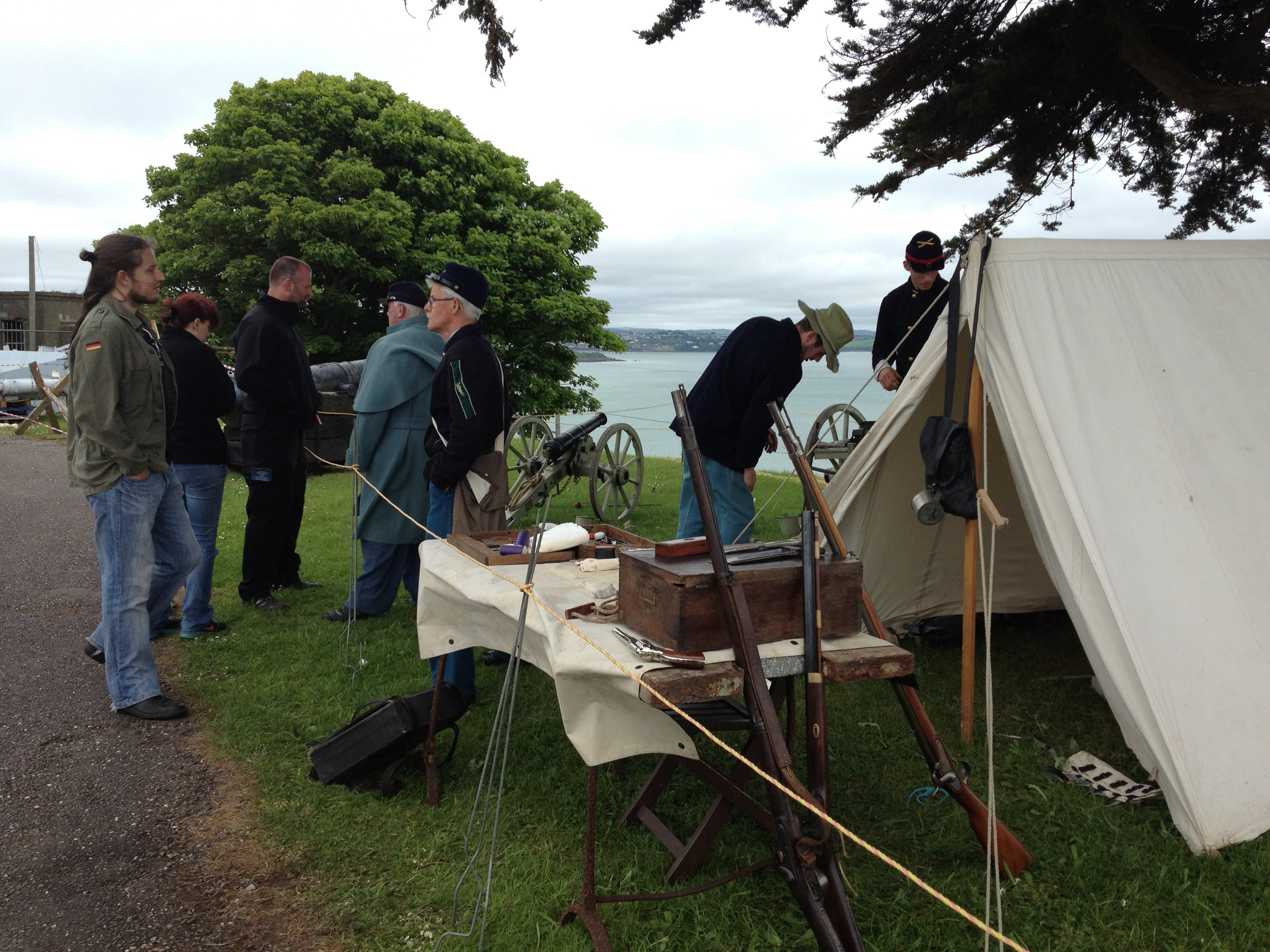
Historical reenactors on the fort's parade ground

In 2010, under a "Rescue Camden" banner, a community group of volunteers began reclaiming and restoring "Camden Fort Meagher". With input from Cork County Council, FÁS, and other partners, the group began to clean, restore, develop and (ultimately) operate the fort as a tourism and heritage centre. Some of these works were covered in documentary programming by RTÉ. As of 2017, the fort and its surrounding 45-acre site were open visitors, but limited to weekends and bank holidays between May and September.

Parts of the site have been restored for self-guided and guided tours – though several areas are not accessible to visitors with reduced mobility. Several exhibits and installations cover the British and Irish military heritage of the fort, and the site houses one of the only resident 9/11 exhibits outside of the United States. There is a café with views of the harbour mouth, and historical reenactment events are sometimes held on the parade square.

== Features ==
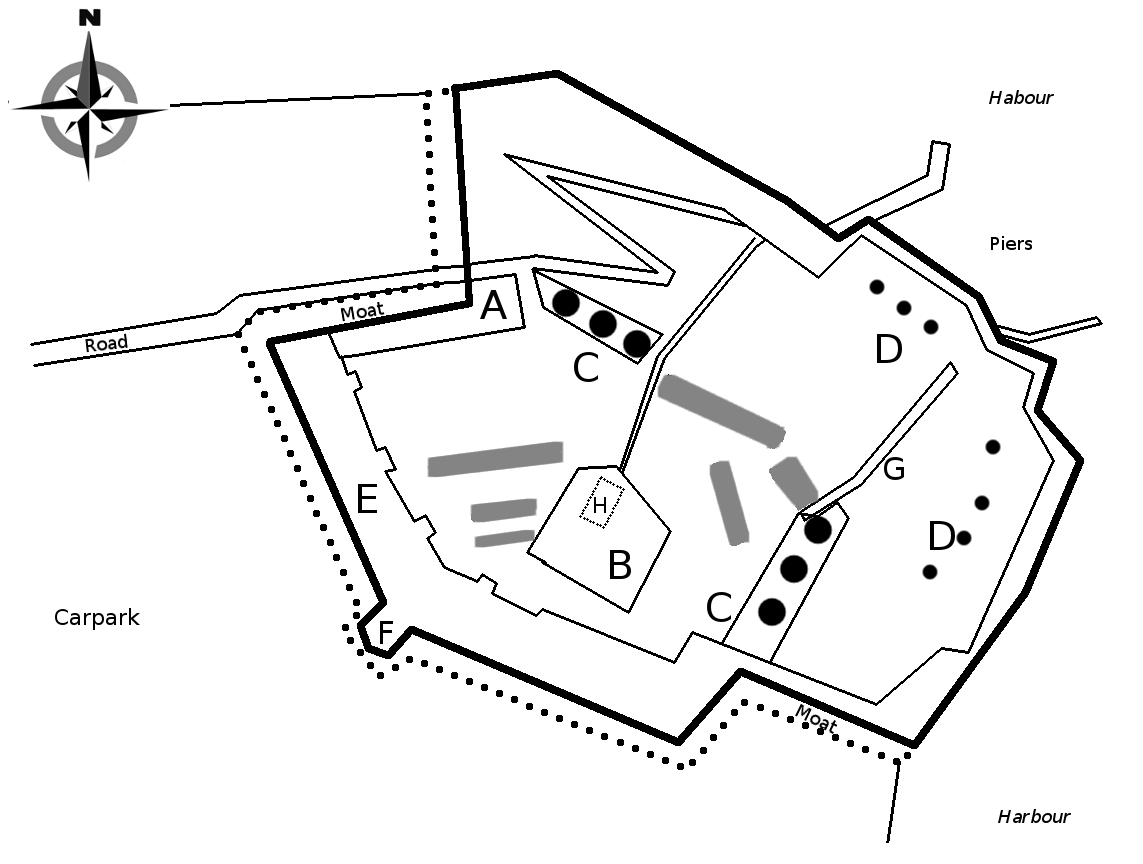
Plan with key features: (A) Barracks, (B) Square, (C) Upper batteries, (D) Lower batteries, (E) Terreplein, (F) Caponier, (G) Bright Tunnel, (H) Main magazine

The features of the fort date primarily to developments in the 19th century, when – at its peak – the fort had 7 officers, more than 200 men, and upwards of 20 guns.

On the landward side, a ditch, ramparts, terreplein, caponier and flanking batteries defended the approaches. The casemated barracks on the north-east corner (close to the land entrance) housed the garrison and commanded the landward defences. The barracks overlooks the approach road which enters the fort on a bridge over the dry moat. A two-tiered musketry gallery and a number of flanking galleries also covered this moat – which at points is 28 feet (8.5 m) wide. Additionally a two-storied caponier had positions for landward gunners. On the ramparts, the terreplein had a number of movable cannon (supported by fixed magazines) and covered an arc of the landward approaches. In 1898, the landward defences are recorded as having four 32 pounder smooth bore breech loading guns.

On the seaward side, land batteries were trained on the harbour from upper and lower batteries. The lower casemated batteries had 10 gun positions (behind shields) extending along the seafront. The upper en-barbette batteries had three guns each on the left and right batteries. In 1898 the upper batteries are recorded as having two 6-inch breech-loading guns and five QF 12-pounder guns, with QF 6-pounder guns in the lower batteries.

At the waterfront, a Brennan Torpedo station was constructed in the 1890s, and a second torpedo slipway was added after 1900. The fort had two piers for boat access.

In the centre of the fort a spiral staircase leads down from the parade ground to the vaulted main powder magazine. This main magazine is connected to the lower batteries by a tunnel. The garrison area connects to the lower batteries and piers via a zigzag path to the west. The upper batteries and parade ground also link to the lower areas via a tunnel (known as the "bright tunnel") to the east.

== See also ==
- Charles Fort, a comparable coastal artillery fort defending Kinsale Harbour
- List of coastal fortifications of County Cork
