= 2009 Irish budget =

- Presented: 14 October 2008
- Country: Ireland
- Parliament: 30th Dáil
- Government: 28th Government of Ireland
- Party: Fianna Fáil; Green Party; Progressive Democrats
- Minister for Finance: Brian Lenihan

The 2009 Irish budget was delivered on 14 October 2008, as the first budget in the tenure of Fianna Fáil's Brian Lenihan as Minister for Finance and the first of Taoiseach Brian Cowen's tenure. It was brought forward from its usual December date due to the 2008 financial crisis. The budget, labelled "the toughest in many years", included a number of controversial measures such as a proposed income levy and the withdrawal of previously promised HPV vaccines for schoolgirls. Other results of the budget included a new income levy being imposed on all workers above a specified threshold and the closure of a number of Irish Army barracks near the border with Northern Ireland.

Public outcry arose over the proposed withdrawal of medical cards and the reinstatement of university fees. A series of demonstrations ensued amongst teachers and farmers, whilst on 22 October 2008, at least 25,000 pensioners and students descended in solidarity on government buildings at Leinster House, Kildare Street, Dublin. Changes to education led to a ministerial meeting with three Church of Ireland bishops over what was viewed as a disproportionate level of cuts to be suffered by Protestant secondary schools. Separately, representatives of the Roman Catholic Church were assured by Minister for Education and Science Batt O'Keeffe that it would continue to be able to provide religious instruction to pupils in primary schools not under its patronage.

Rebellion within the ranks of the ruling coalition government led to a number of defections of disenchanted coalition members. County Wicklow TD Joe Behan resigned from the Fianna Fáil party in protests at the proposed medical card changes. He, alongside two other government deputies, later voted against his former colleagues in two crucial Dáil votes on medical cards and cancer vaccines. These defections reduced the Irish government's majority of twelve by one quarter.

== Announcement ==
The Irish government announced on 3 September 2008 that it was to bring forward the 2009 government budget from its usual December date to 14 October 2008. In a statement the government claimed that this was largely due to a decrease in the global economy.

== Important budget features ==
Irish government budget for 2009 introduced a number of new proposals which generated controversy in the weeks that followed. Ultimately a number of these proposals were either altered or abolished entirely.

The budget announcement included an increase in stamp duty on cheques.

The initial announcements included:

- A new levy of between 1% and 2% on all incomes.
- Excise duties on cigarettes, wine and petrol all increased. The price of 20 cigarettes and bottles of wine were both increased by 50c. The price of a litre of petrol increased by 8c. Betting tax doubled to 2%, whilst motor tax increased by between 4% and 5%.
- DIRT rates, motor tax and VAT all increased. The standard rate of VAT rose by 0.5% to 21.5%, whilst DIRT rose 3% to 23%.
- Automatic entitlement to a medical card for the over-70s was abolished.
- Old-age pensions increased by €7 per week.
- Limitations were placed on entitlements to child benefit and childcare supplement.
- A€200 levy was imposed on employer-provided parking spaces in urban centres.
- 41 state agencies and bodies were to be abolished, amalgamated or privatised.
- There was to be a slowdown in decentralisation.
- Stamp duty on ATM cards was halved, paid for by an increase in stamp duty on cheques.
- Extra stamp duty relief was announced for first time buyers as was an increase in the size of local council mortgages, and a cut in stamp duty on commercial property.
- Ministers and Ministers of State took a 10% pay cut.

Lenihan expected the economy to decrease by 1.5% in 2009, as measured by GNP, with GDP contracting by 0.75%. He suggested that unemployment would increase to 7.3% but inflation would decrease to 2.5%. He suggested a budget deficit of 6.5% of GDP in 2009, (compared to the EU limit of 3%). Current spending was predicted to rise by 1.8%, with a current deficit of just over €4.7 billion and a capital deficit of €8.7 billion expected.

== Health cuts ==
=== Medical card controversy ===
Prior to the announcement of the government budget on 14 October 2008, each person over the age of seventy living in the Republic of Ireland was entitled to a medical card providing free medical, dental and optical treatment and medicines. The budget proposed to change this and introduced a means-tested system of benefits. The proposed income eligibility limits to be introduced for over seventies were published on the Health Service Executive's website on 15 October 2008. The site stated that the net weekly income limit for medical card eligibility would be €201.50 for a single person, €173.50 for a single person living with a family and €298 for a married couple. One day later, these eligibility levels were increased so that the income rate for a single person would be €240.30, the income rate for a married couple was increased to €480.60 per week, whilst the previously proposed rate of €173.50 for a single person living with a family was abolished.

Significant political upheaval in the Oireachtas followed the publication of the proposals. On 17 October, County Wicklow Deputy Joe Behan resigned his position citing his discomfort with the medical card changes and the proposals to increase school class sizes. He suggested that past taoisigh Éamon de Valera and Seán Lemass "would be turning in their graves at the decisions made in the past week". Independent Deputy Finian McGrath then threatened to withdraw his support for the government unless the plan to remove the overs 70s automatic right to a medical card was withdrawn completely. Taoiseach Brian Cowen postponed a planned trip to China, sending Minister for Education and Science Batt O'Keeffe ahead to lead the delegation.

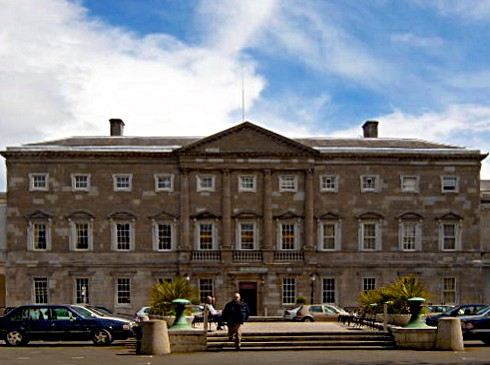
Leinster House on Kildare Street, Dublin (above) was the target of many protests following the government budget announcement in October 2008.

Despite a government promise to retain medical cards for 95% of over-70s, an estimated 15,000 pensioners joined in a demonstration organised by the Irish Senior Citizens Parliament on 22 October. This protest, dubbed "the grey army" by media reports included representatives from organisations such as the Tara Disabled Mineworkers, Pensioners' Association, Mayo Active Retirement Association and the Socialist Party as well as numerous independent protesters, marched on Dublin's Leinster House to protest the changes to their medical card scheme. Iarnród Éireann claimed that up to 1,000 pensioners had travelled on early morning trains from Counties Cork and Kerry for the protest rally, with a spokesman suggesting that the 06:30 and 07:30 trains from Cork were particularly busy. An extra train had to be commissioned from Cork at 08:20 to cope with the demand by pensioners for transport to reach Dublin in time for the demonstration. All five carriages on the 07:30 train were fully booked by the previous evening; ironically, many of the passengers were pensioners using their free travel passes also provided by the government. The pensioners also availed themselves of taxis offering free journeys to the over-70s especially for the protest. One elderly man clutched a banner heralding the invitation "Just shoot us, it would be quicker".

Later that evening, a motion put forward by the opposition party Fine Gael seeking a reversal of the government's decision was defeated by 81–74 in a vote which took place in Dáil Éireann. Behan and McGrath both voted with the Opposition for the first time.

=== Cervical cancer vaccine withdrawal ===
A €10million scheme to vaccinate 26,000 12-year-olds against cervical cancer by September 2009 was announced in September 2008. Minister for Health and Children Mary Harney pulled the scheme just three months later due to a withdrawal of funding as a result of the government budget. She cited that there would not be enough money to fund her scheme even though it would only cost 0.07% of the HSE's annual €14billion budget. There was a public backlash, with a "Harney must reinstate cervical cancer vaccine" protest Facebook attracting 8,000 members and unions also launching a campaign to bring back the vaccines. The opposition parties were silenced when they pointed out the unusual timing of the announcement, with Fine Gael accusing Harney of attempting to hide the decision which was announced on the same day as the 2008 US presidential election. Labour Party leader Eamon Gilmore was ruled out of order by the Ceann Comhairle when he attempted to raise the matter in Dáil Éireann. Fine Gael health spokesperson James Reilly suggested that bonuses paid to HSE management would have funded the scheme's administration. County Donegal Deputy and former Fianna Fáil Minister Jim McDaid, a 20-year-old friend of Harney, abstained in a Dáil vote on 13 November in protest at the withdrawal of the vaccine, stating: "The withdrawal of a life-saving vaccine is not one that I can support" and calling it a "death sentence". Just as in the medical card vote, the government defeated the Opposition.

Thousands of students marched down O'Connell Street (pictured above on a quieter day in 2008) in protest against the reintroduction of university fees.

== Education cuts ==
=== University fees controversy ===
On the same day as the pensioners protested, the students of Ireland also protested over a proposal to reinstate university fees. On 11 August 2008, Ireland's Minister for Education and Science, Batt O'Keeffe, had indicated that fees for university students were back on the agenda in a move which contravened prior government policy. University fees were abolished in 1995 by the Fine Gael-Labour government. With university presidents putting pressure on the government to approve this proposal, Brian Lenihan announced an increase in the annual college registration fee by €600 on budget day. The Union of Students in Ireland (USI) arranged a protest in response to claims that any increase in tuition fees would prevent many from attending college.

Despite intense garda presence, the 14:00 lunchtime protest of 15,000 students caused widespread traffic disruption in Dublin city centre, with the students gathering in Parnell Square ahead of a steel drum beating march down O'Connell Street, on to College Green, up Dawson Street and across Molesworth Street. The march culminated in a rally outside the national parliament at Leinster House as the protesters were addressed by student leaders and opposition politicians. In what the USI President Shane Kelly called "one of the largest student protests in years", students waved banners and placards imprinted with the slogans "education not recession", "free fees means more degrees" and "Enda Kenny (leader of the Opposition) would not approve of this" and chanted a multitude of dialogues such as "no cutbacks, no fees, no Fianna Fáil TDs" and "education is a right not a privilege". TDs and senators waited at Leinster House to address the students upon their arrival included Labour Party education spokesperson Ruairi Quinn, Fine Gael education spokesperson Brian Hayes, Sinn Féin Senator Pearse Doherty and Independent Senator Ivana Bacik. There were no arrests and no trouble was reported. Quinn stated it was possible that the students demands would be met since the government had backed down on the budgetary issues of medical cards and income levies. A spokeswoman for Minister for Education and Science Batt O'Keeffe was said to have responded to a request to meet student leaders but later cancelled this "due to commitments arising following the budget".

Since then, a number of government ministers have encountered hostility from students whilst visiting campuses at University College Dublin and National University of Ireland, Galway. Three people were arrested for breaches of the peace following two minor scuffles as 100 students took part in a banner-bearing protest at the Clinton Institute on the Belfield campus of UCD on 20 October 2008. Brian Lenihan was to chair a function at the Institute but met with a blockade as students responded to the proposed barrier to their education by creating a physical barrier of their own against the Minister. On the evening of 12 November 2008, student campaign group Free Education for Everyone (FEE) attempted to blockade Minister of State, Conor Lenihan (a brother of Minister for Finance Brian Lenihan) from his visit to University College Dublin, in protest at the proposed re-introduction of university fees.

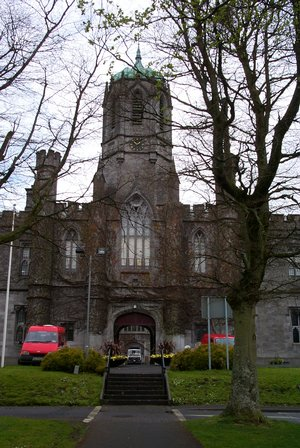
In December 2008, the Minister for Community, Rural and Gaeltacht Affairs Éamon Ó Cuív and his secretary became involved in a scuffle with student protesters whilst wandering around the Quadrangle (front entrance pictured above) at NUI Galway.

Meanwhile, at NUI Galway on the evening of 9 December 2008, the Minister for Community, Rural and Gaeltacht Affairs Éamon Ó Cuív became involved in a violent student demonstration which made national headlines. Ó Cuív was on the campus for the official launch of a new €50 million engineering building in place of the Minister for Education and Science Batt O'Keeffe, who had pulled out over fears that he would be met with violent action. As he entered the Quadrangle Ó Cuív was met by a group of fifty students, one of whom the Minister later accused of manhandling his secretary. Ó Cuív stepped in and physically assailed at least one protester by the arms as himself and his assistants were blockaded against a wall. University security intervened and brought the Minister and his assistants to another door which they managed to successfully manoeuvre away from the baying crowd. A spokeswoman claimed that the crowd crushed the Minister's secretary against a wall and kicked her as one of the students set about "waving a big stick at her". A protester insisted that the demonstration had only become violent when Ó Cuív became physically active. The protest was organised by NUI, Galway Students' Union and FEE in the form of the NUIG societies of Labour Youth, Ógra Sinn Féin, Young Greens and Young Fine Gael. Ó Cuív was previously targeted by some of the same students who stormed and occupied his constituency office for over an hour less than a week prior to the university riot. On 2 February 2009, former Taoiseach Bertie Ahern was blockaded and jostled out of NUI Galway by a group of angry students protesting over the reintroduction of fees as he attempted to lecture the Literary and Debating Society.

On 13 November 2008, 3000 students were involved in a lunchtime anti-fees protest on O'Connell Street, Sligo. The students chanted slogans such as "no cutbacks, no fees, no Fianna Fáil TDs" and carried a variety of posters such as "the Batt-man is Robin students", whilst one waved a placard advertising his "Ford Fiesta for sale" followed by his mobile number.

=== Substitute teachers controversy ===
Brian Lenihan encountered further controversy over his proposal to reduce the number of substitute teachers made available to schools. More protests followed as the teachers unions took to the streets in Galway, Tullamore (which included people from counties Kilkenny, Laois, Offaly, Meath, Westmeath, Longford and Tipperary), Cork and Donegal Town (which included 5,000 people from counties Donegal, Leitrim and Sligo) before a mass protest of at least 10,000 people through Dublin on 6 December 2008. At a cost of €2 million, the Department of Education then readjusted some of the substitution teacher cuts called for by Lenihan in his budget. Under a deal agreed with the schools, each would receive substitution cover composed of a certain number of hours based upon the number of teachers absent on a particular day. Primary schools would receive substitute cover for teachers on uncertified sick leave after their first day of absence. Schools with more than one teacher absent would receive substitute cover for the second day of absence. Full cover would be provided in schools with two teachers or less.

=== Protestant Schooling Controversy ===
The minority Protestant population in the Republic were particularly incensed by cuts announced by the Minister for Education to grants previously available to the 21 Protestant denomination secondary schools which breached a 40-year-old agreement reached when free secondary education was introduced in the Republic by the then Minister for Education, Donogh O'Malley. Under that agreement, Protestant secondary schools which had to provide a boarding element (and therefore charge fees) to provide education for the widespread but sparse Protestant population were treated in the same manner as "free" Roman Catholic schools. The Protestant community in return accepted that they could not expect the State to provide a "free" secondary school in every locality, and that they would have to pay a level of fees to educate their children. It was planned that Protestant churches through their administration of the grants provided by the department would ensure that those least able to pay fees are assisted to the greatest extent possible.

In October 2008, the Minister of Education grouped these Protestant schools which provided boarding for students living at a distance into the same category as Roman Catholic schools which charged fees. This change meant that the schools must employ fewer teachers per child, and the schools would not receive government funding for non-teaching staff, as the free Roman Catholic schools do. Opposition to these cuts was mounted by the Church of Ireland, the Methodist Church and the Presbyterian Church.

== Income levy difficulties ==
Unions warned the Irish government that its proposal to introduce an income levy of between 1% and 2% on all incomes would undermine a previously negotiated national pay agreement. In response, the government abolished the proposal and replaced it with a 3% levy on all incomes over €250,000.

== Social welfare controversy ==
Within the government budget was announced a Social Welfare Bill worth €515 million. When the Minister for Social and Family Affairs, Mary Hanafin introduced it to Dáil Éireann she was accused of "kicking the unemployed when they are down". An Opposition attempt to defeat the Bill due to "savage cuts" was again defeated, this time by 68–60. Labour Party spokesperson Róisín Shortall objected saying "it provides for savage cuts on the most vulnerable people in our society, and it deliberately targets the poor, the unemployed, children and people with disabilities". Fine Gael spokesperson Olwyn Enright objected because of the Minister's intention "to bring in amendments on Committee Stage two days after the Bill's publication", to abolish the Combat Poverty Agency. Shortall also criticised a proposal to remove child benefit from 18-year-olds, saying it would affect poorer children.

== Farming protests ==
On 29 November 2008, approximately 300 farmers protested over budget cuts which affected them in Offaly. The farmers, members of the Irish Cattle and Sheep Farmers Association, demonstrated outside the Tullamore Court Hotel where Taoiseach Brian Cowen was attending a meeting with county councillors from around the country. Tánaiste and Minister for Enterprise, Trade and Employment Mary Coughlan spoke at the event at which she, Cowen and Minister for Transport Noel Dempsey, Minister for Education and Science Batt O'Keeffe and Minister for Agriculture, Fisheries and Food Brendan Smith face questions on their various roles in the budget. Over 7,000 farmers from counties Clare, Limerick, Tipperary, Cork, Kerry, Galway, Offaly, Roscommon and Wexford were involved in a mass demonstration in Ennis on 30 November 2008. Padraig Walshe, the President of the Irish Farmers Association (IFA), claimed budget cutbacks would affect his union's members and would lead to a €20 million loss to farmers in the region each year.

== Sale of army barracks ==
Rockhill Barracks (pictured) in Letterkenny, County Donegal was one of four army barracks facing closure in the wake of the budget announcement.

In the build-up to the budget, Minister for Defence Willie O'Dea suggested that some army barracks in Ireland would be sold. Four barracks and a military hospital located along the border with Northern Ireland were deemed suitable for closure as the British Army had withdrawn a number of years previously. The closure of Rockhill Barracks and Lifford Barracks in County Donegal was expected to impact heavily on the economy of nearby Letterkenny. Two other army barracks closed as of January 2009; Monaghan Barracks was the first to close on 22 January, with Connolly Barracks in Longford following suit on 29 January. Barracks expenditure had previously been discussed in the Dáil in 1983 and six barracks were sold in 1999 by the then Minister for Defence Michael Smith.

== See also ==
- 2009 Irish emergency budget
- Air Travel Tax
