= Irish Wolfhound =

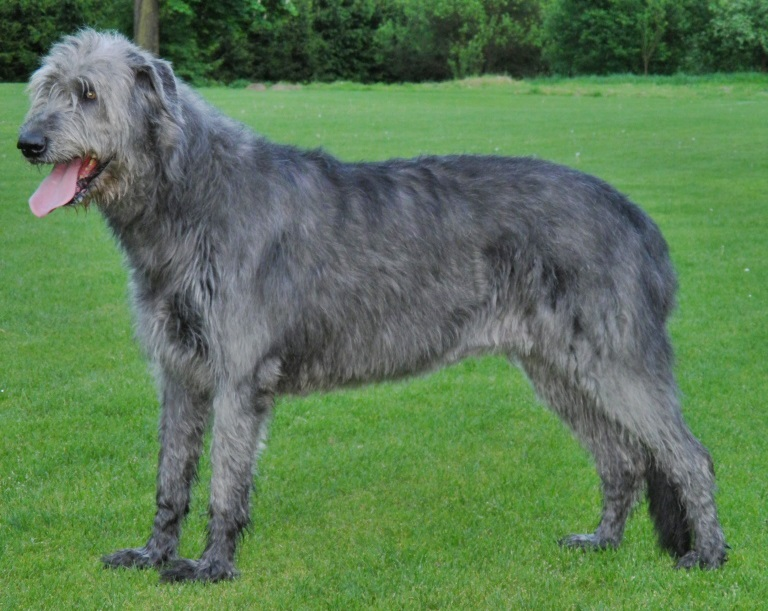
- Origin: Ireland (original breed); England (modern breed) (Note: The original, historic Irish Wolfhound originated in Ireland. The modern breed, however, was developed in Gloucestershire, England (for further information, see Modern wolfhound).)
- Foundation stock: Two Irish dogs; Scottish Deerhound; Great Dane
Traits
- Height: 81–86 cm (32–34 in)
	Males	minimum 79 cm (31 in)
	Females	minimum 71 cm (28 in)
Weight	Males	minimum 54.5 kg (120 lb)
	Females	minimum 40.5 kg (89 lb)
- Coat: rough and hard on the head, body and legs; beard and hair over eyes particularly wiry
- Colour: black, brindle, fawn, grey, red, pure white, or any colour seen in the Deerhound
- Litter size: 4–12
Kennel club standards
- Irish Kennel Club: standard
- Fédération Cynologique Internationale: standard

The Irish Wolfhound (Irish: Cú Faoil) is a breed of large sighthound that has, by its presence and substantial size, inspired literature, poetry and mythology. One of the largest of all breeds of dog, the breed is used by coursing hunters who have prized it for its ability to dispatch game caught by other, swifter sighthounds. In 1902, the Irish Wolfhound was declared the regimental mascot of the Irish Guards.

== History ==
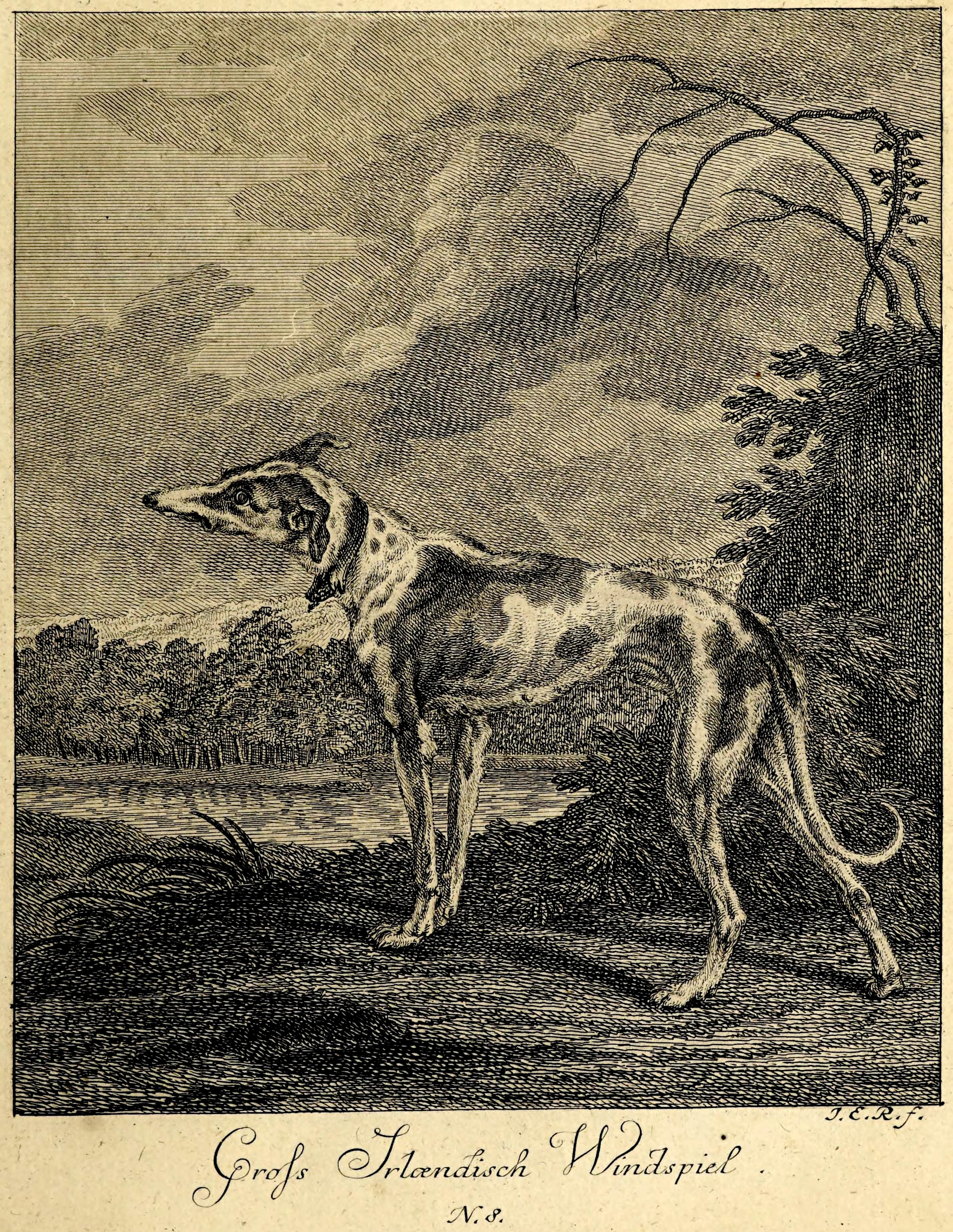
Groſs Irlændisch Windspiel, 'large Irish greyhound', from Entwurf einiger Thiereby Johann Elias Ridinger, 1738

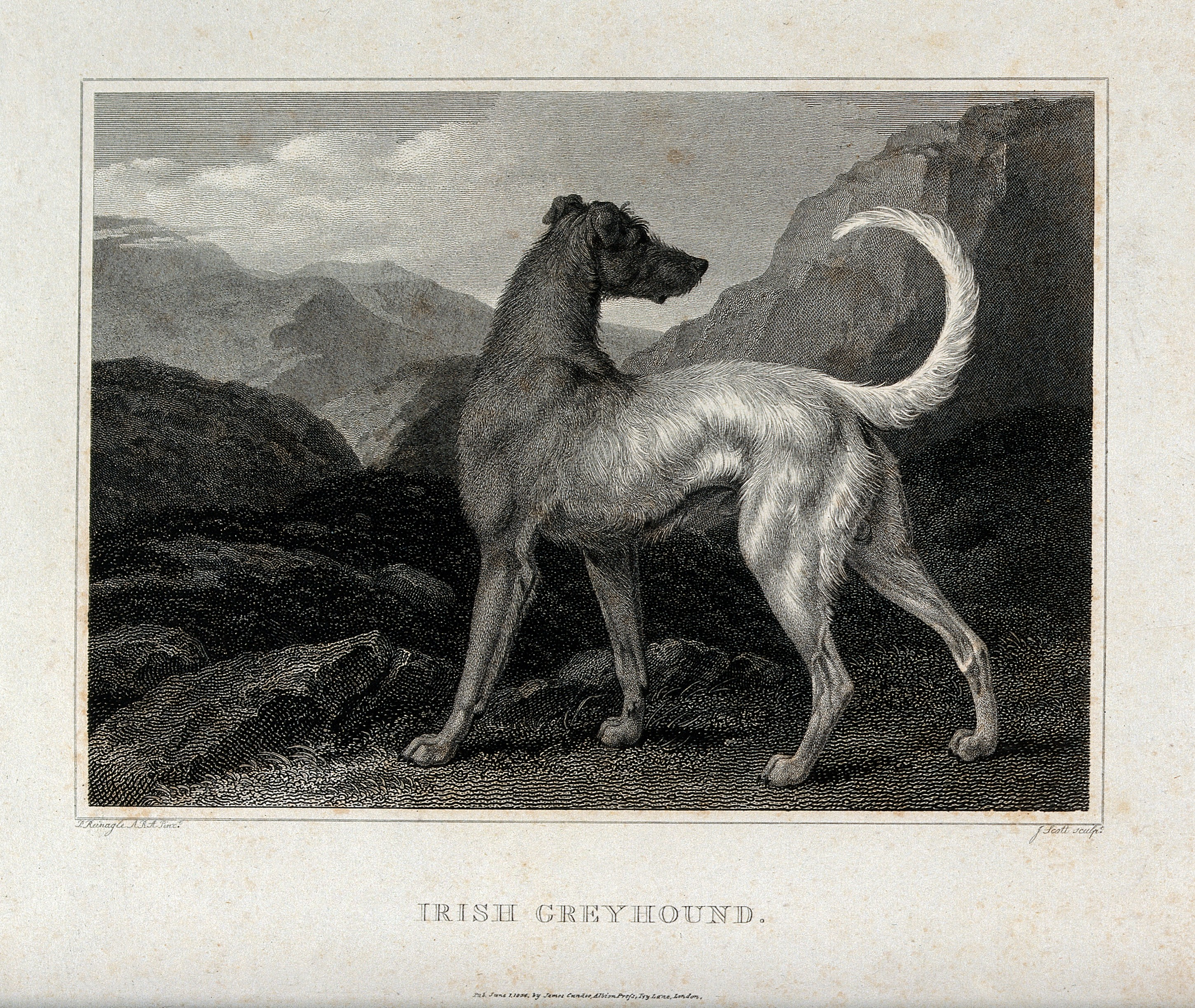
Irish Greyhound in a mountainous landscape, etching by Philip Reinagle, 1804

=== Pre-19th century ===
In 391, there is a reference to large dogs by Quintus Aurelius Symmachus, a Roman consul who got seven "canes Scotici" as a gift to be used for fighting lions and bears, and who wrote "all Rome viewed (them) with wonder". Scoti is a Latin name for the Gaels (ancient Irish). Dansey, the early 19th century translator of the first complete version of Arrian's work in English, On Coursing, suggested the Irish and Scottish "greyhounds" were derived from the same ancestor, the vertragus, and had expanded with the Scoti from Ireland across the Western Isles and into what is today Scotland.

Wolfhounds were used as hunting dogs by the Gaels, who called them Cú Faoil (Irish: Cú Faoil [ˌkuː ˈfˠiːlʲ], composed of the elements "hound" and "wolf", i.e. "wolfhound"). Dogs are mentioned as cú in Irish laws and literature dating from the sixth century or, in the case of the Sagas, from the old Irish period, AD 600–900. Cú Chulainn, a mythical warrior whose name means "hound of Culann", is supposed to have gained this name as a child when he slew the ferocious guard dog of Culann. As recompense he offered himself as a replacement.

In discussing the systematic evidence of historic dog sizes in Ireland, the Irish zooarchaeologist Finbar McCormick stressed that no dogs of Irish Wolfhound size are known from sites of the Iron Age period of 1000 BC through to the early Christian period to 1200 AD. On the basis of the historic dog bones available, dogs of current Irish Wolfhound size seem to be a relatively modern development: "it must be concluded that the dog of Cú Chulainn was no larger than an Alsatian and not the calf-sized beast of the popular imagination".

In his Historie of Ireland, written in 1571, Edmund Campion gives a description of the hounds used for hunting wolves in the Dublin and Wicklow mountains. He says: "They (the Irish) are not without wolves and greyhounds to hunt them, bigger of bone and limb than a colt". Due to their popularity overseas many were exported to European royal houses leaving numbers in Ireland depleted. This led to a declaration by Oliver Cromwell being published in Kilkenny on 27 April 1652 to ensure that sufficient numbers remained to control the wolf population.

References to the Irish Wolfhound in the 18th century tell of its great size, strength and greyhound shape as well as its scarcity. Writing in 1790, Thomas Bewick described it as the largest and most beautiful of the dog kind; about 36 inches high, generally of a white or cinnamon colour, somewhat like the Greyhound but more robust. He said that their aspect was mild, disposition peaceful, and strength so great that in combat the Mastiff or Bulldog was far from being an equal to them.

The last known wolf in Ireland was killed in County Carlow in 1786. It is thought to have been killed at Myshall, on the slopes of Mount Leinster, by a pack of wolfdogs kept by a Mr Watson of Ballydarton. The wolfhounds that remained in the hands of a few families, who were mainly descendants of the old Irish chieftains, were now symbols of status rather than used as hunters, and these were said to be the last of their race.

Thomas Pennant (1726–1798) reported that he could find no more than three wolfdogs when he visited Ireland. At the 1836 meeting of the Geological Society of Dublin, John Scouler presented a paper titled "Notices of Animals which have disappeared from Ireland", including mention of the wolfdog.

=== Modern wolfhound ===
Captain George Augustus Graham (1833–1909), of Rednock House, Dursley, Gloucestershire, was responsible for reviving the Irish wolfhound breed. He stated that he could not find the breed "in its original integrity" to work with:

That we are in possession of the breed in its original integrity is not pretended; at the same time it is confidently believed that there are strains now existing that tracing back, more or less clearly, to the original breed; and it appears to be tolerably certain that our Deerhound is descended from that noble animal, and gives us a fair idea of what he was, though undoubtedly considerably his inferior in size and power.

— Captain G. A. Graham

In Ireland, Graham acquired "Faust" of Kilfane and "Old Donagh" of Ballytobin, County Kilkenny; these were the respective progenitors of Graham's breeding program and said to descend from original Irish wolfhound strains. Based on the writings of others, he had concluded that the Scottish Deerhound and Great Dane were derived earlier from the wolfhound. As a result, said breeds were heavily emphasized in his breeding program. For an outbreed, a Borzoi and "Tibetan wolfdog" may also have been included. It has been suggested that the latter was a Tibetan Kyi Apso.

In 1885, Captain Graham founded the Irish Wolfhound Club, and the Breed Standard of Points to establish and agree the ideal to which breeders should aspire. In 1902, the Irish Wolfhound was declared the regimental mascot of the Irish Guards.

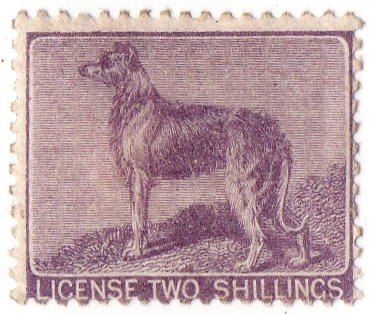
Nineteenth-century dog-licence stamp

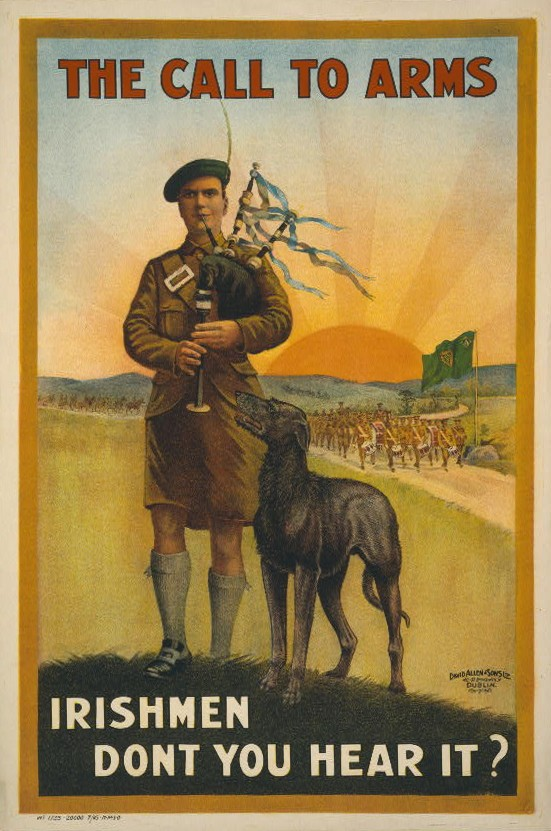
Recruitment poster, 1915

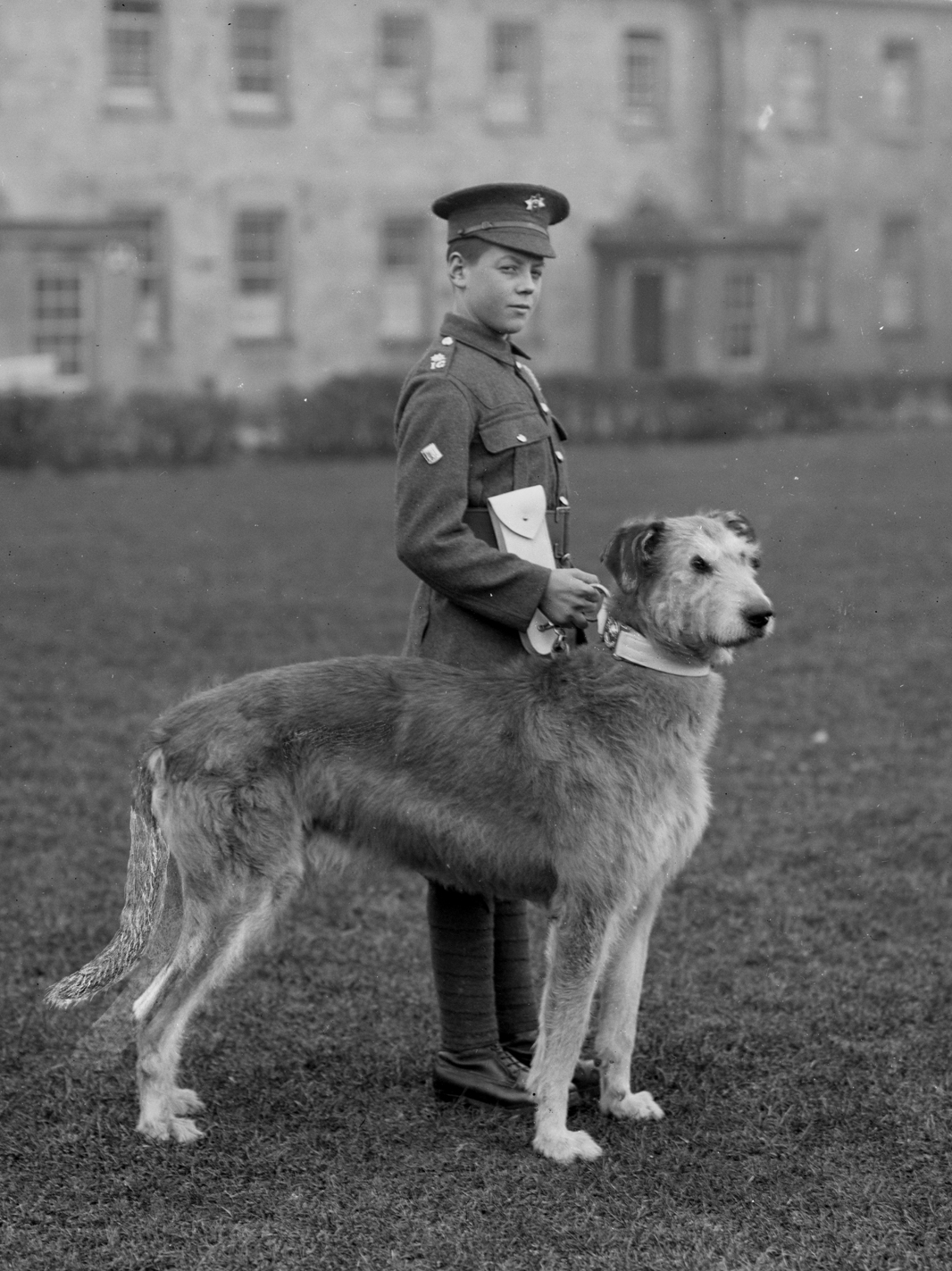
Leitrim Boy, mascot of the Irish Guards, at Waterford Barracks, 1917

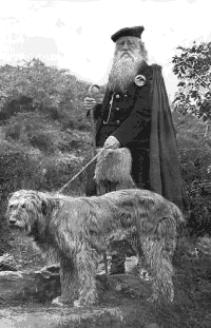
The O'Mahony of Kerry, 1930

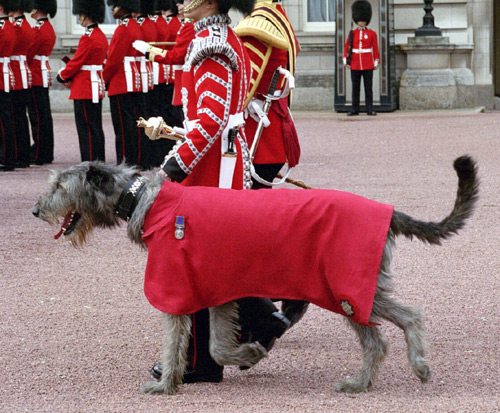
Irish Guards, mascot in parade dress

=== DNA analysis ===
Genomic analysis indicates that although there has been some DNA sharing between the Irish wolfhound with the Deerhound, Whippet, and Greyhound, there has been significant sharing of DNA between the Irish Wolfhound and the Great Dane. One writer has stated that for the Irish Wolfhound, "the Great Dane appearance is strongly marked too prominently before the 20th Century". George Augustus Graham created the modern Irish wolfhound breed by retaining the appearance of the original form, but not its genetic ancestry.

== Characteristics ==
The Irish Wolfhound is characterised by its large size. According to the FCI standard, the expected range of heights at the withers is 81–86 centimetres (32–34 inches); minimum heights and weights are 79 cm (31 in)/54.5 kg (120 lb) and 71 cm (28 in)/40.5 kg (89 lb) for dogs and bitches respectively. It is more massively built than the Scottish Deerhound, but less so than the Great Dane.

The coat is hard and rough on the head, body and legs, with the beard and the hair over the eyes particularly wiry. It may be black, brindle, fawn, grey, red, pure white, or any colour seen in the Deerhound.

The Irish Wolfhound is a sighthound, and hunts by visual perception alone. The neck is muscular and fairly long, and the head is carried high. It should appear to be longer than it is tall, and to be capable of catching and killing a wolf.

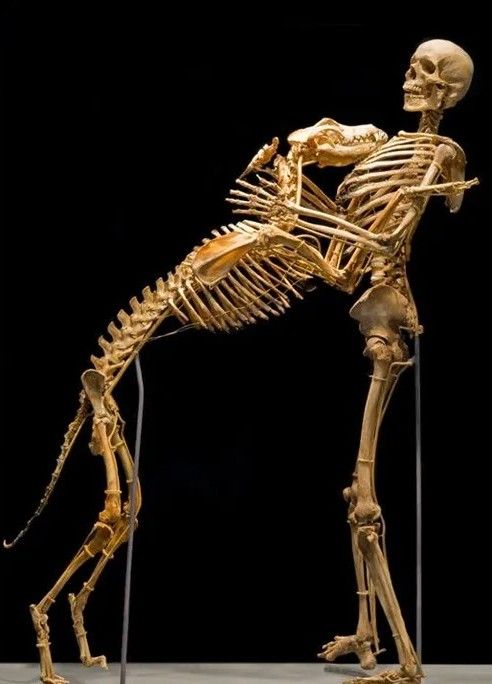
The skeleton of an Irish Wolfhound compared to that of a human (Grover Krantz)

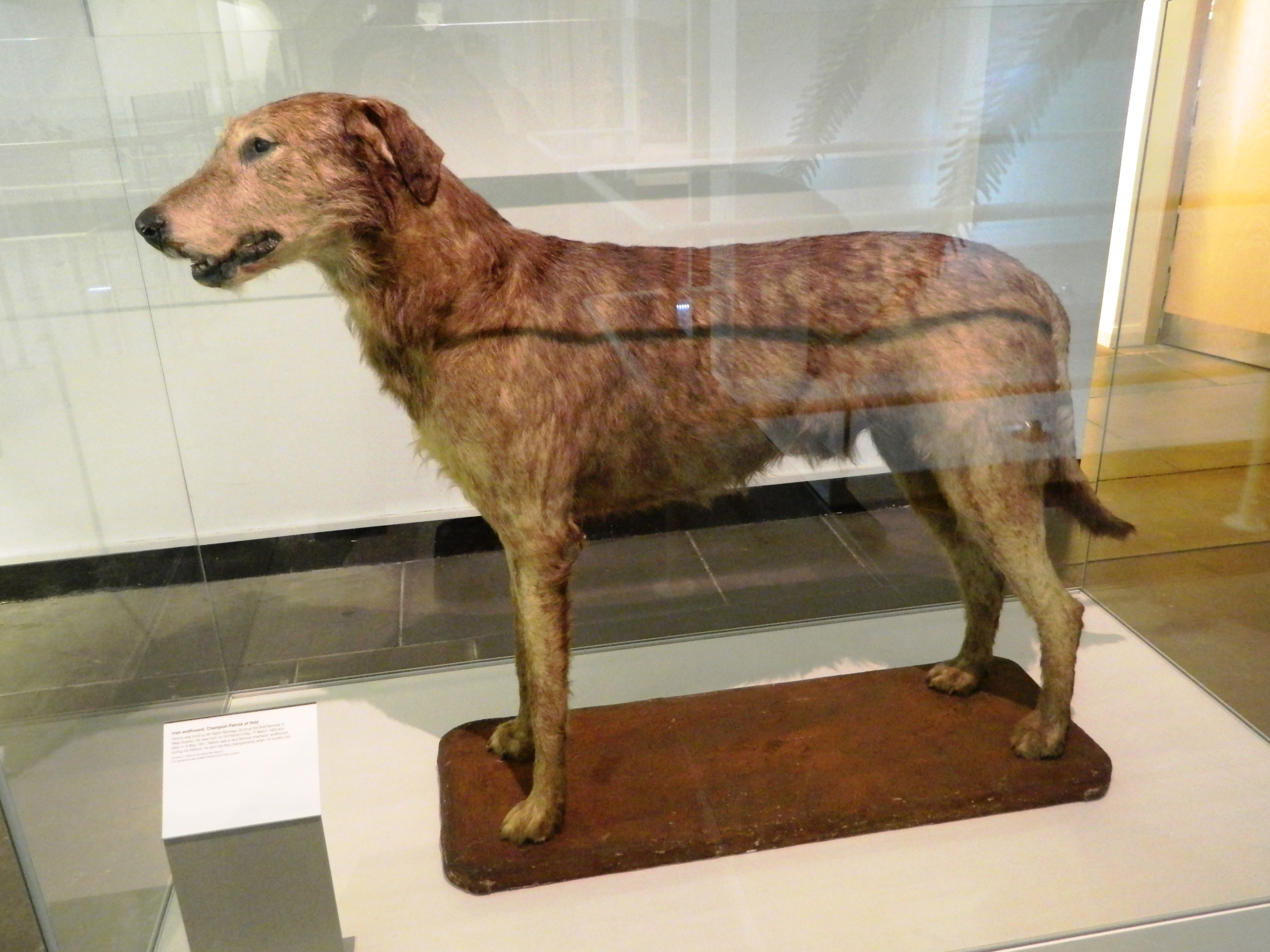
Patrick of Ifold, born 1923, now in the Ulster Museum

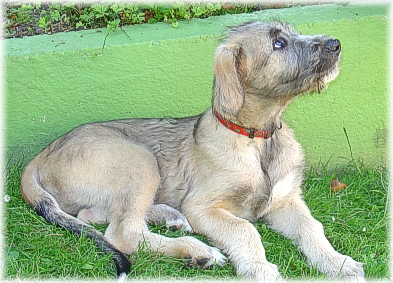
A puppy

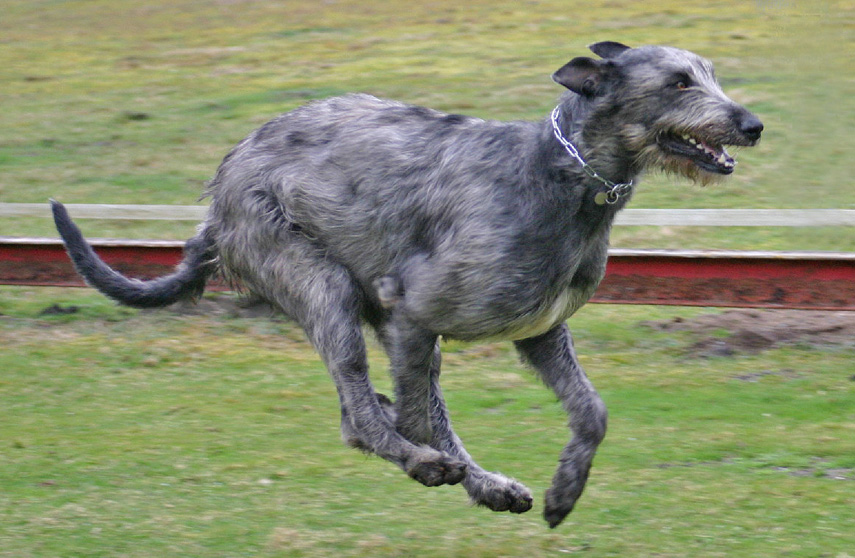

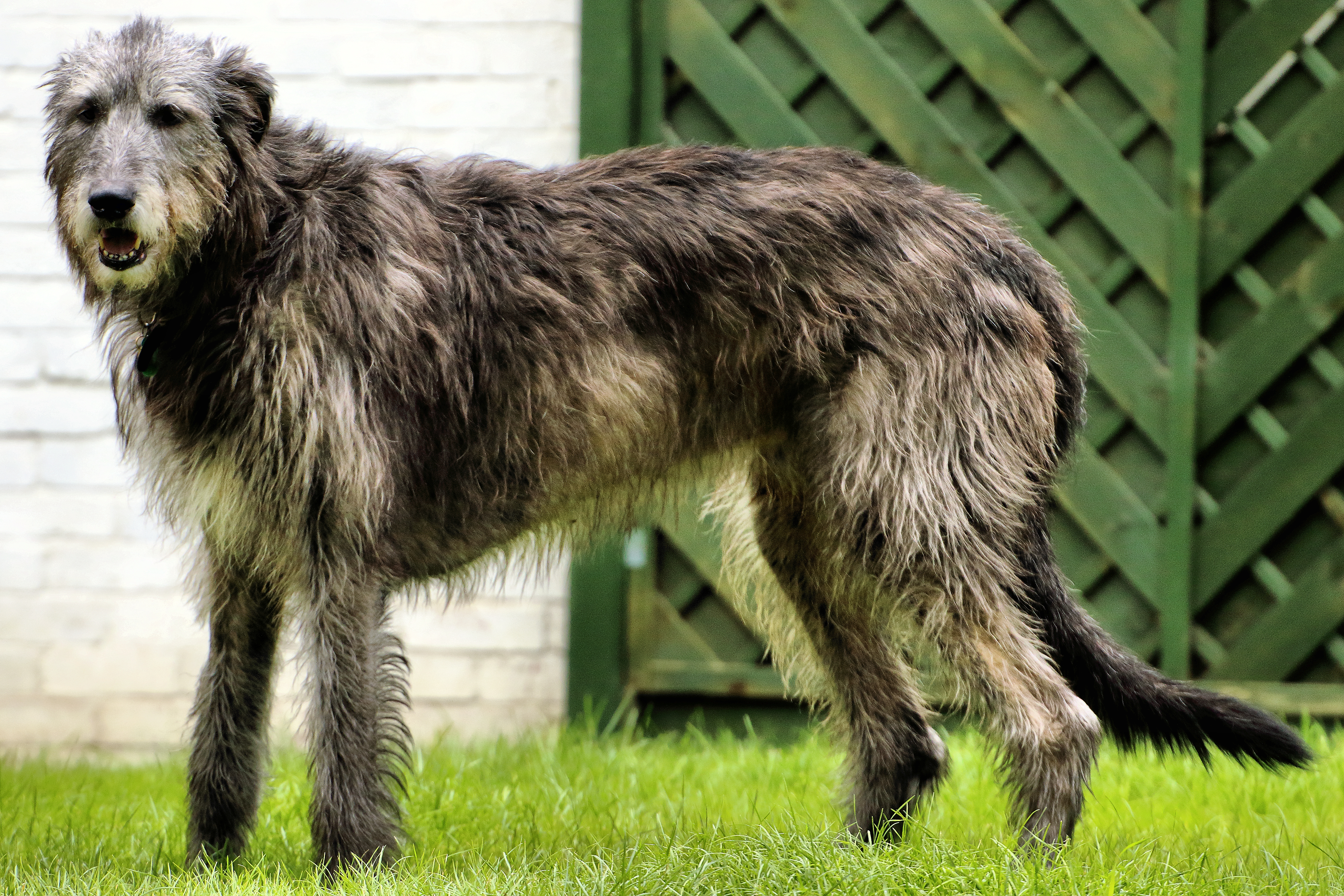
Tricolour coat

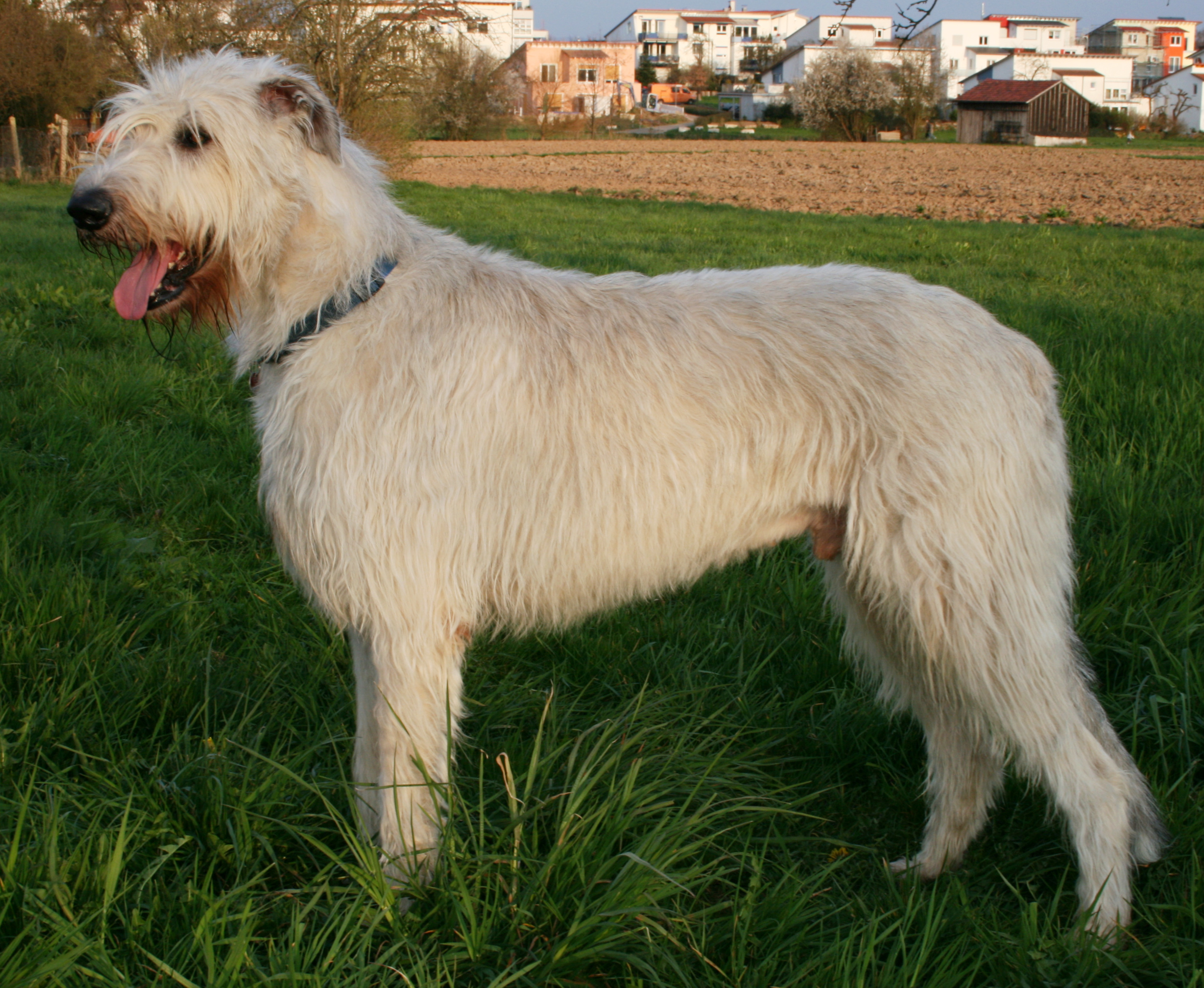
White coat

== Temperament ==
Irish Wolfhounds have a varied range of personalities and are most often noted for their personal quirks and individualism. The breed is generally introverted, intelligent, and reserved in character. Wolfhounds often create a strong bond with their family and can become quite destructive or morose if left alone for long periods of time.

The Irish Wolfhound makes for an effective and imposing guardian. The breed becomes attached to both owners and other dogs they are raised with and is therefore not the most adaptable of breeds. Bred for independence, an Irish Wolfhound is not necessarily keen on defending spaces. A wolfhound is most easily described by its historical motto, "gentle when stroked, fierce when provoked".

Irish Wolfhounds are often favored for their loyalty, affection, patience, and devotion. Although at some points in history they have been used as watchdogs, unlike some breeds, the Irish Wolfhound is often unreliable in this role as they are often friendly toward strangers, although their size can be a natural deterrent. Author and Irish Wolfhound breeder Linda Glover believes the dogs' close affinity with humans makes them acutely aware and sensitive to ill will or malicious intentions leading to their excelling as a guardian rather than guard dog.

== Health ==
Like many large dog breeds, Irish Wolfhounds have a relatively short lifespan. Published lifespan estimations vary between 4.95 and 8.75 years. More recently a 2024 UK study found a life expectancy of 9.9 years for the breed compared to an average of 12.7 for purebreeds and 12 for crossbreeds. A 2005 Swedish study of insurance data found 91% of Irish Wolfhounds died by the age of 10, higher than the overall rate of 35% of dogs dying by the age of 10.

The most frequently reported diseases are dilated cardiomyopathy, bone cancer, gastric dilatation volvulus, and osteochondrosis. Different studies have reported a rate of dilated cardiomyopathy in the breed between 12.1% and 44.7% of Irish Wolfhounds. In a study that compared multiple breeds the Irish Wolfhound had a 3.4 odds ratio of the condition compared to overall. The condition is likely hereditary in the breed.

One study found the Irish Wolfhound to be 27.5 times more likely to contract osteogenic sarcoma than the overall dog population.
