= 2012 Irish budget =

- Presented: 5–6 December 2011
- Parliament: 31st Dáil
- Government: 29th Government of Ireland
- Party: Fine Gael; Labour Party
- Minister for Finance: Michael Noonan (FG)
- Minister for Public Expenditure and Reform: Brendan Howlin (Lab)
- Total revenue: €35.825 billion
- Total expenditures: €55.8 billion
- Deficit: €18.9 billion (8.6% of GDP)
- Website: Budget 2012

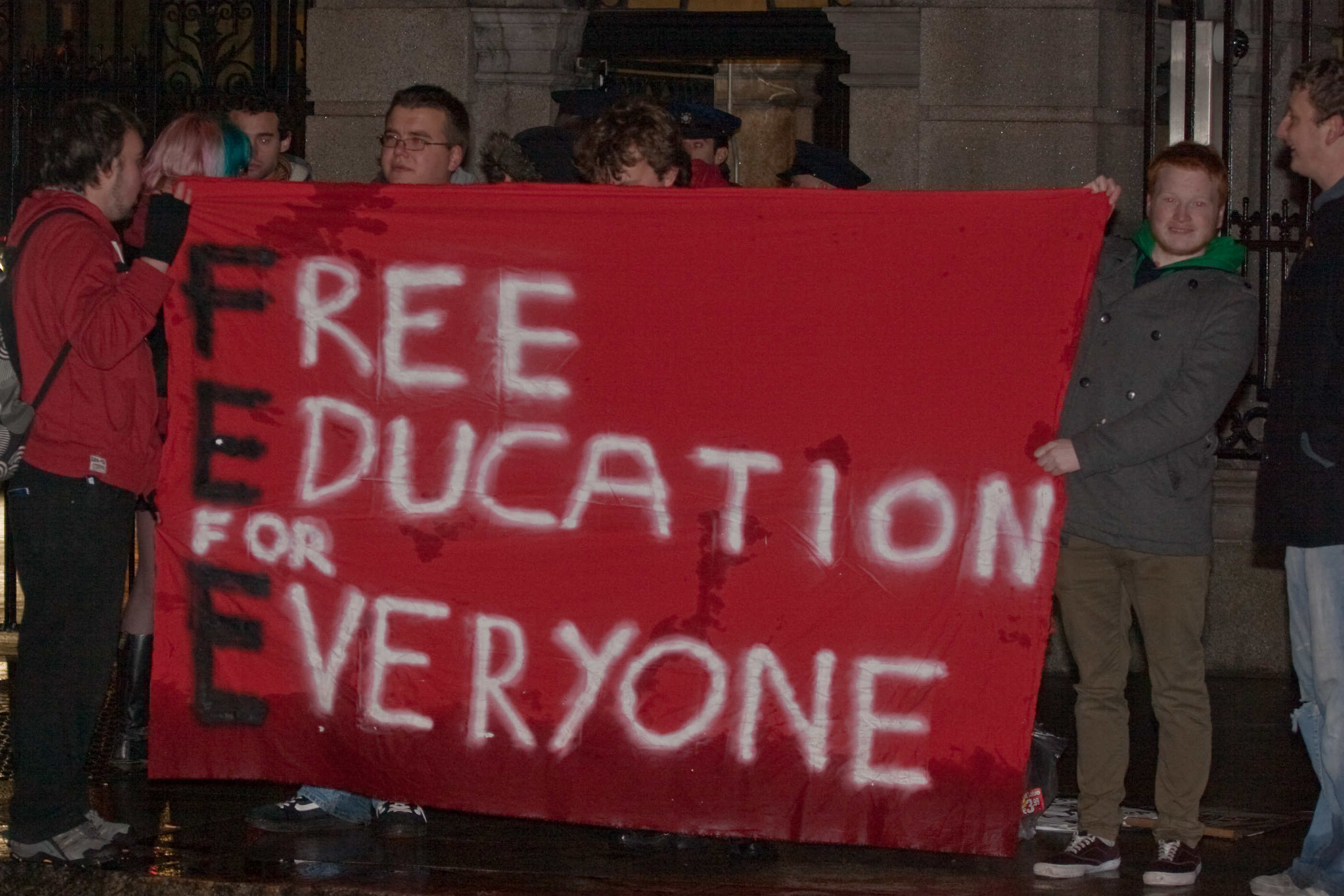
A Free Education for Everyone banner outside Dáil Éireann as the government delivers the 2012 Irish budget on 6 December 2011.

The 2012 Irish budget was the Irish Government budget for the 2012 fiscal year, the first budget of the 29th Government of Ireland. It was presented to Dáil Éireann in two parts on 5–6 December 2011, with the first part delivered by Minister for Public Expenditure and Reform Brendan Howlin, and the second part delivered by Minister for Finance Michael Noonan. The budget contained tax increases, and spending cuts of €3.6bn for 2012.

== Before the budget ==
The budget was preceded by a rare televised national address by a Taoiseach when Enda Kenny spoke to the country two days beforehand. This was only the sixth time that a Taoiseach has addressed the nation, reflecting the gravity of the Irish economic condition, in what Kenny stressed were "exceptional" circumstances. The address drew the second highest television audience of the year on Irish television. The following day, Thomas Pringle TD replied on television in an address on behalf of the opposition technical group of TDs in Dáil Éireann.

In another departure from tradition, the public spending allocation was announced the day before Budget Day by Minister for Public Expenditure and Reform, Brendan Howlin, in the Comprehensive Expenditure Report.

== Main points ==
- Increase in motor tax from 1 January.
- Reduction in the VAT rate on district heating from 21 percent to 13.5 percent, to benefit businesses.
- Farmers to be able to claim a VAT refund on wind turbines purchased from 1 January 2012.
- Broaden the base for pay related social insurance (PRSI) through removal of the remaining 50 percent employer PRSI relief on employee pensions.
- Broaden PRSI base to cover rental, investment, and other forms of income from 2013.
- Increase the rate of notional distribution on the highest value Approved Retirement Funds and similar products to 6 percent.
- Increase the rate of tax on the transfer of an ARF retirement fund on death to a child over 21 from 20 to 30 percent.
- Abolish the "citizenship" condition for payment of the Domicile Levy so as to ensure that "tax exiles" cannot avoid it by renouncing their citizenship.
- Increase the current rate of Capital Acquisitions Tax from 25 to 30 percent after Budget Day.
- Increase Capital Gains Tax from 25 to 30 percent after Budget Day.
- carbon tax not to be applied to solid fuels.
- Household charge of €100 can be paid in installments.
- Increase in carbon tax to be applied to petrol and auto diesel from midnight following Budget Day (1½ cents per litre).
- Reduce the Group A Tax-free threshold for Capital Acquisitions Tax from €332,084 to €250,000.
- Increase deposit interest retention tax (DIRT) from 27 to 30 percent.
- VAT increased by 2 percent. Government commits to not raise the standard rate of VAT beyond 23 percent during its lifetime.
- 300,000 people to move from liability to pay Universal Social Charge.
- Universal Social Charge: From 1 January, exemption level to be raised from €4,004 to €10,036. Revenue to collect USC on a cumulative basis in 2013.
- Additional new tax measures of €1 billion.
- No increase in income tax.
- General government deficit to be 10.1 percent of GDP in 2012 and 8.2 percent in 2013 - both below targets in troika bailout.
- A property relief surcharge of 5 percent to be imposed on investors with an annual gross income over €100,000.
- Increased mortgage interest relief for first time buyers buy from Budget Night up to a year, but nothing if wait until 2013
- Non-first time buyers in 2012 to benefit from mortgage relief at 15 percent instead of 10 percent proposed by the last Government.
- Mortgage interest rate relief increased to 30 per cent.
- No changes on residential stamp duty.
- Capital Gains Tax incentive also announced; modifying retirement relief from Capital Gains Tax so it better incentivises the timely transfers of farms and businesses before the current owners reach the age of 66.
- Fifty percent stock relief for all registered farm partnerships and 100 percent stock relief for certain young trained farmers forming such partnerships.
- Stamp Duty on commercial property including farmland to be cut by 6 to 2 percent from midnight following Budget Day.
- Nine per cent rate of VAT for tourism extended to open farms.
- The first €100,000 of R&D expenditure of all companies will be allowed on a volume basis for the purpose of the R&D Tax Credit.
- Corporate tax exemption for new start-up companies to be extended for the following three years and to be available for companies that commence trading in 2012, 2013 and 2014.

== After the budget ==
The Bill proposing the introduction of a "household charge" passed by 90 to 47 votes in the Dáil late on 14 December 2011. The following day, nine TDs helped launch a nationwide campaign against the household charge.
