= List of Irish military installations =

This is a list of Irish military installations occupied by the Defence Forces (including Army, Air Corps, Naval Service and Reserve Defence Forces) in the Republic of Ireland by province and overseas.

The Irish Defence Forces maintains approximately 20,000 acres of land for military training in the state.

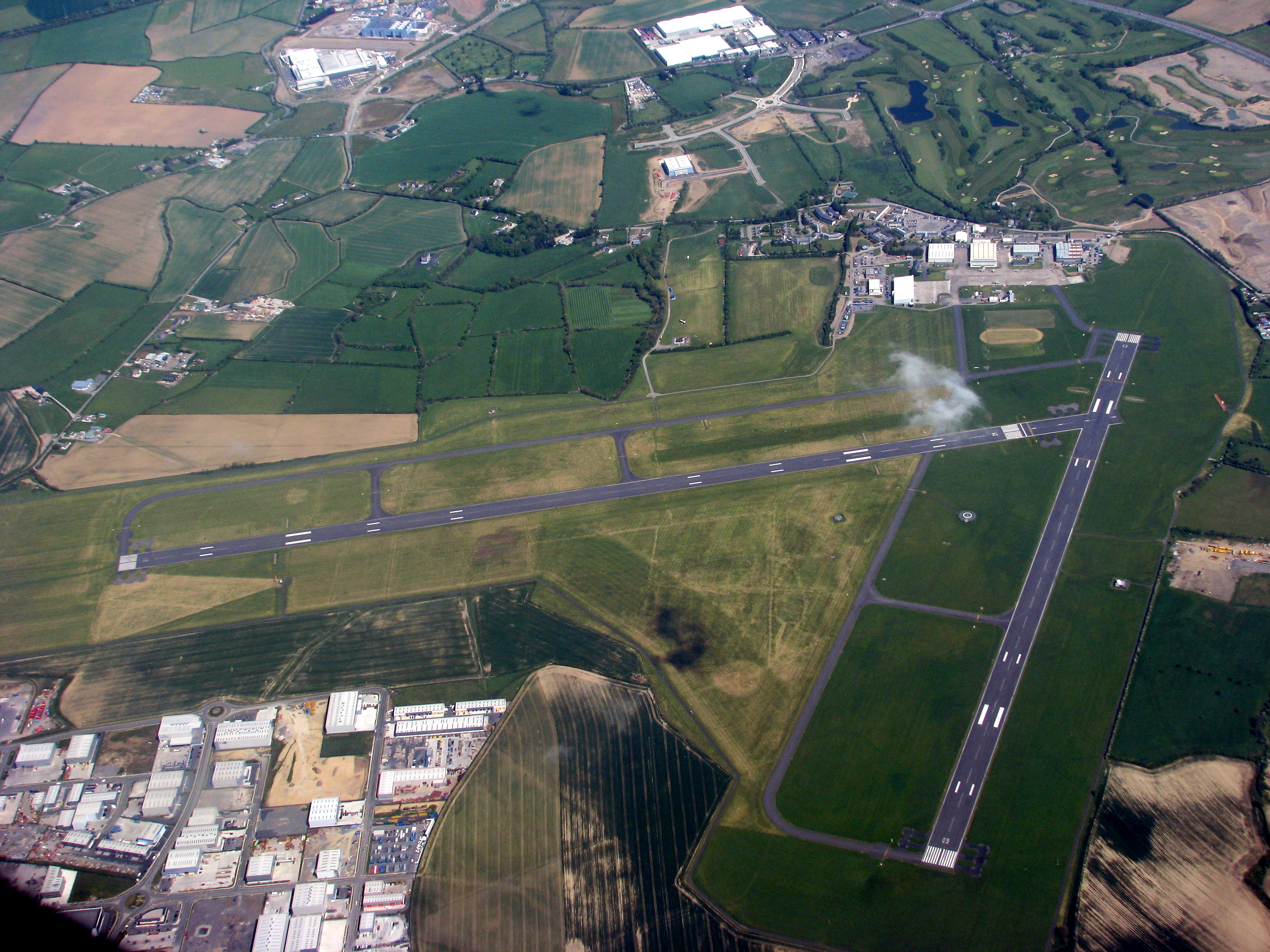
Casement Aerodrome (Baldonnel) is home to the Irish Air Corps

== Connacht ==
- Renmore Barracks, Renmore, County Galway
- RDF Clifden, County Galway
- RDF Boyle, County Roscommon
- RDF Sligo, County Sligo
- Carnagh Rifle Range, County Roscommon
- Oranmore Rifle Range, County Galway

== Leinster ==
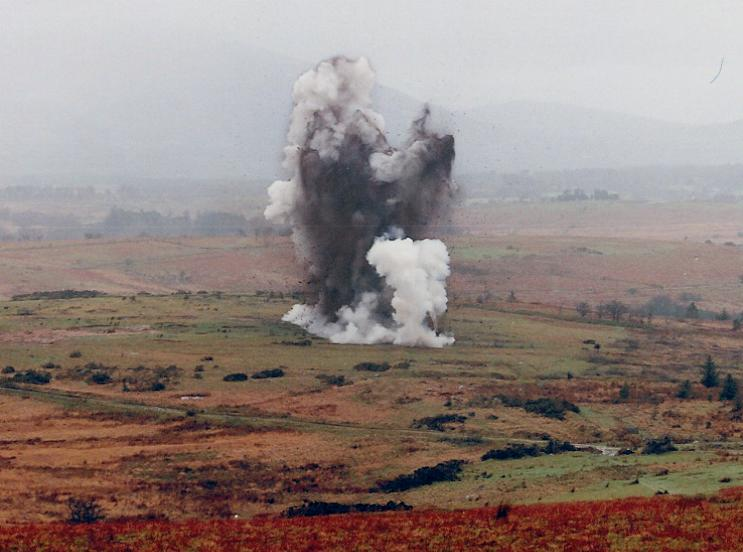
Irish Army Corps of Engineers detonate explosives in the Glen of Imaal

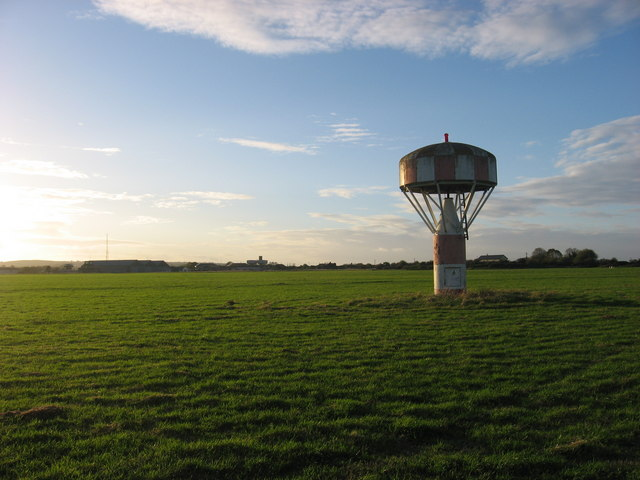
Gormanston Camp houses a former aerodrome

- Cathal Brugha Barracks, Rathmines, Dublin
- McKee Barracks, Blackhorse Avenue, Dublin
- St Bricin's Military Hospital, Dublin 7
- Church of the Sacred Heart, Dublin
- Casement Aerodrome, Baldonnel, County Dublin
- DFTC, Curragh Camp, County Kildare
- Department of Defence Headquarters, Station Road, Newbridge, County Kildare
- Stephens Barracks, County Kilkenny
- RDF Portlaoise, County Laois
- Aiken Barracks, Dundalk, County Louth
- Red Barn Rifle Range, Dundalk, County Louth
- Gormanston Camp and Aerodrome, County Meath
- RDF Navan, County Meath
- Custume Barracks, Athlone, County Westmeath
- Military Barracks Wexford, County Wexford
- Glen of Imaal, County Wicklow
- Kilbride Camp and Rifle Range, County Wicklow
- Coolmoney Camp, County Wicklow
- Range Warden's Post, Seskin, County Wicklow

== Munster ==
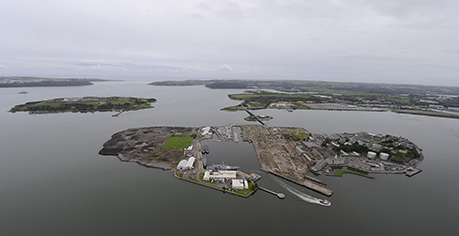
Haulbowline Naval Base is home to the Irish Naval Service

- RDF Premises Ennis, County Clare
- Lynch Camp Kilworth, County Cork
- Bere Island, County Cork
- Naval Base, Haulbowline, County Cork
- Fort Davis, Whitegate, County Cork
- Fort Templebreedy, Crosshaven, County Cork
- Collins Barracks, County Cork
- RDF Fermoy, County Cork
- RDF Kilcrohane, County Cork
- RDF Skibbereen, County Cork
- RDF Mallow, County Cork
- Ballymullen Barracks Tralee, County Kerry
- Fort Shannon, Tarbert, County Kerry
- RDF Premises Killorglin, County Kerry
- Sarsfield Barracks, County Limerick
- Military Barracks Nenagh, County Tipperary
- McCan Barracks, Templemore, County Tipperary
- Kilcoran Rifle Range, County Tipperary
- Military Barracks Waterford, County Waterford

== Ulster ==
- Finner Camp, County Donegal
- RDF Letterkenny, County Donegal
- RDF Cavan, County Cavan

== Former ==
The list includes barracks, forts and other military installations located in the Republic of Ireland that have been occupied by Irish forces (any Irish force, pro-treaty or anti-treaty) after the Anglo-Irish Treaty of December 1921.

- Connolly Barracks, County Longford (closed 2009)
- Castlebar Military Barracks, Castlebar, County Mayo (closed 2012)
- Columb Barracks, Mullingar, County Westmeath (closed 2012)
- Collins Barracks, Dublin (closed 1997)
- Clancy Barracks, Islandbridge, Dublin (closed 1998)
- Devoy Barracks, Naas, County Kildare (closed 1998)
- Kildare Barracks, Kildare, County Kildare (closed 1998), also known as Magee Barracks
- Newbridge Barracks, Newbridge, County Kildare (closed 1920s), also known as Cavalry Barracks
- Birr Barracks, Crinkill, County Offaly (closed/destroyed 1920s)
- Fermoy Barracks, Fermoy, County Cork (closed/destroyed 1920s)
- Kickham Barracks, Clonmel, County Tipperary (closed 2012)
- Rockhill Barracks, Letterkenny, County Donegal (closed 2009)
- Strand Barracks, Limerick, County Limerick (closed 1935)
- Waterford Barracks, Waterford, County Waterford (closed/destroyed 1920s)
- Murphy Barracks, Ballincollig, County Cork (closed around 1998)
- Beggars Bush Barracks, Dublin, County Dublin (closed 1929)
- Griffith Barracks, Dublin, County Dublin (closed 1988)
- Richmond Barracks, Dublin, County Dublin (closed 1922), also known as Keogh Barracks
- Ship Street Barracks, Dublin, County Dublin (closed after 1922)
- Magazine Fort, Dublin, County Dublin (closed 1988)
- Camden Fort Meagher, Crosshaven, County Cork (closed 1989)
- Fort Mitchel, County Cork (closed sometime late 20th century)
- Fort Dunree, County Donegal (closed 1990)
- Duncannon Fort, County Wexford (closed 1993)
- Arklow Barracks, Arklow, County Wicklow (closed/destroyed 1922)
- Elizabeth Fort, Cork, County Cork (closed/destroyed 1922)
- Charles Fort, Kinsale, County Cork (closed/destroyed 1922)
- Troopers Close, Kinsale, County Cork (closed/destroyed 1922)
- Bandon Barracks, Bandon, County Cork (closed/destroyed 1922)
- Clonakilty Barracks, Clonakilty, County Cork (closed/destroyed 1922)
- Fort Berehaven, Bere Island, County Cork (Defence Forces withdrawn sometime after 1938)
- Kilkerrin Battery, Labasheeda, County Clare (closed sometime before 1973)
- Castle Barracks, Limerick, County Limerick (closed 1920s)
- Mulgrave Street Barracks, Limerick, County Limerick (closed mid-1920s)

== Overseas ==
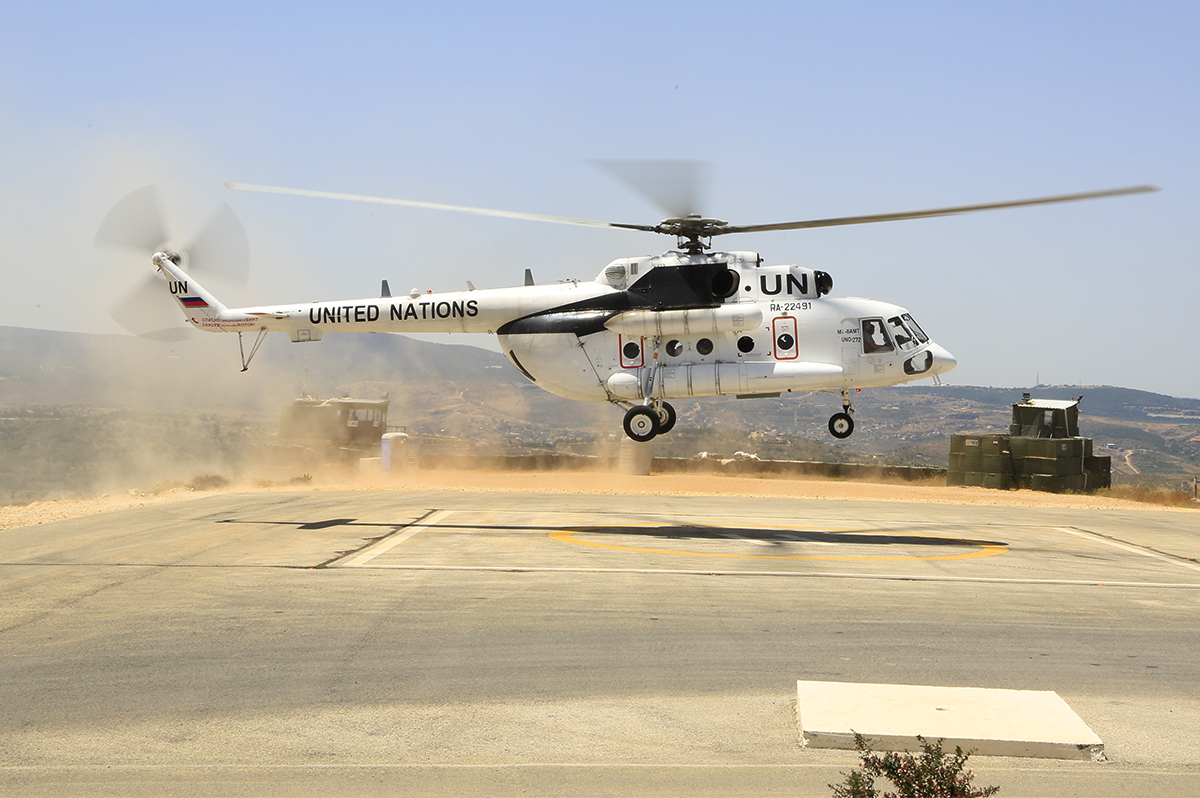
A UN helicopter lands at an Irish outpost in At Tiri, Lebanon

- Camp Shamrock, United Nations Post 2-45, At Tiri, Lebanon
- United Nations Post 6-52, Maroun al-Ras, Lebanon
