= Medical card =

A medical card (Irish: cárta leighis) is a personal document issued by the Republic of Ireland in the form of a plastic card issued to residents of Ireland who are entitled to free or reduced-rate medical treatment. Those eligible fall below a certain income tax threshold or have costly ongoing medical requirements. The medical card system is administered by the Health Service Executive (HSE).

== Benefits ==
The card entitles the holder to free visits to general practitioners (GPs), free or drastically reduced-price hospital and dental treatment, and prescribed medication for a nominal charge of €1.50 per item. Some holders are eligible for reduced Universal Social Charge rates and are entitled to a range of other benefits. Holders, or children dependent on holders, are exempt from paying State Examination fees, including the Junior Certificate and Leaving Certificate.

A GP visit card is available to people earning up to 50% above the income limit. As the name suggests, it grants free visits to GPs but does not include any of the other benefits.

== History and politics ==
Medical cards were introduced by Part III of the Health Act 1953, passed by the then Fianna Fáil government after the failure of the previous inter-party government's somewhat more ambitious Mother and Child Scheme. It was described as a "white card replacing the red ticket", the latter being a proof of pauperism required under the Irish poor laws for access to the public dispensary. The medical card scheme was administered by county councils until the newly created Health Boards took over in 1970; these in turn were replaced by the HSE in 2005.

Until the 2008 financial crisis, persons aged over 70 were automatically entitled to free medical cards. One of the austerity measures of the 2009 Irish budget was the abrogation of this entitlement. After several protests, the benefit was reinstated to all who earn under €700 per week, more than three times the limit for younger people.

In March 2016 the HSE's National Medical Card Unit invited public comment on its draft three-year plan for 2016–18.

Commentators criticising the alleged clientelism of TDs often instance representations TDs make on behalf of constituents who have been denied a medical card, despite such representations having no effect on the outcome of any review of the constituent's case.
