= Free Education for Everyone =

Student campaign in Ireland

- Location: Ireland

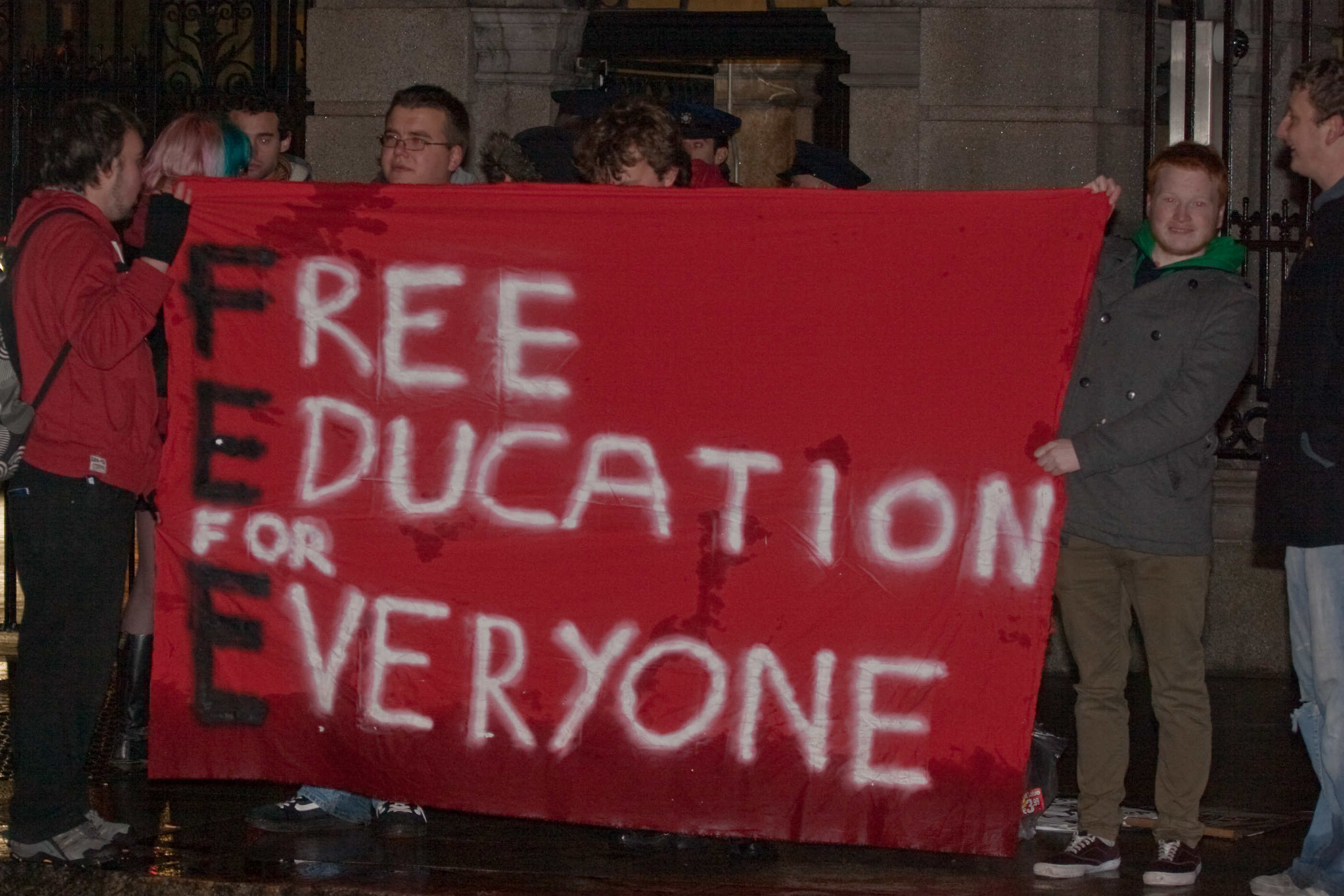
A Free Education for Everyone banner outside Dáil Éireann as the government delivers the 2012 Irish budget on 6 December 2011.

Free Education for Everyone (FEE) was an Irish student campaign group which was set up in September 2008 in University College Dublin (UCD) to fight the proposed re-introduction of university fees. FEE was active in Ireland's main universities, including University of Limerick (UL), University College Dublin (UCD), Trinity College Dublin (TCD), NUI Maynooth (NUIM), University College Cork (UCC) and NUI Galway (NUIG) and Queen's University Belfast.

Activists organised mass protests (in conjunction with the Union of Students in Ireland or USI). It was mainly known for its occupations of government constituency offices and blockades against government ministers and of government buildings. Politicians such as the former Taoiseach Bertie Ahern, and Ministers Batt O'Keeffe, Éamon Ó Cuív, Brian Lenihan and his brother Conor Lenihan were targeted.

== Background ==
On 11 August 2008, Ireland's Minister for Education and Science, Batt O'Keeffe indicated that fees for university students were back on the agenda in a move which contravened prior government policy. With university presidents putting pressure on the government to approve this proposal, the Minister for Finance, Brian Lenihan announced an increase in the annual college registration fee by €600 on budget day, 14 October 2008. The Union of Students in Ireland (USI), in co-ordination with the fledgling FEE, arranged a mass protest in response to claims that any increase in tuition fees would prevent many from attending college.

== University blockades ==
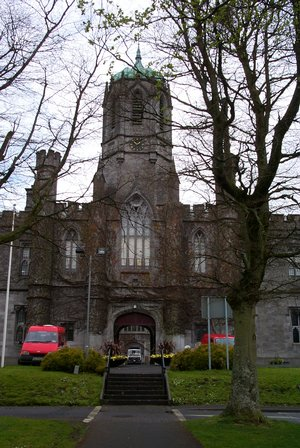
The Quadrangle at NUI Galway where a number of blockades have taken place against members of the ruling Fianna Fáil party.

A number of government ministers encountered hostility from students whilst visiting campuses at UCD and NUIG. Three members of FEE, including the chair of Sinn Féin's UCD branch were arrested for breaches of the peace following two minor scuffles as 100 students took part in a banner-bearing protest at the Clinton Auditorium on the Belfield campus of UCD on 20 October 2008. The three were later released without charge. Brian Lenihan was to chair a function at the Institute but met with a blockade as students responded to the proposed barrier to their education by creating a physical barrier of their own against the Minister. On the evening of 12 November 2008, FEE activists attempted to blockade Minister of State, Conor Lenihan (a brother of Minister for Finance Brian Lenihan) from his visit to University College Dublin, in protest at the proposed re-introduction of university fees.

On 9 December 2008, Eamon Ó Cuív was accused of "manhandling" a student activist at NUI Galway after claiming that his secretary was being "squashed up against the wall with students kicking her and one of them waving a big stick at her". The student has said he was on the opposing side of a railing and photographic evidence has proven this to be the case, with one photo clearly showing the Minister grappling the student.

A visit by Bertie Ahern to NUI Galway on 2 February 2009 was disrupted by FEE activists, forcing the former Taoiseach to cancel a scheduled lecture on the campus. There were scuffles with gardaí as Ahern was blocked from entering the college grounds and booed by a group of FEE activists and other NUIG students. One man was arrested but later released.

== February 2009 protest ==
FEE and the USI planned a further major demonstration in Dublin for 4 February 2009 to protest against the proposed move to reintroduce third-level fees, following comments from Batt O'Keeffe which suggested he would like to do so. FEE produced 20,000 leaflets to promote this protest which their activists distributed across the country. The USI argued that if it were to happen then poorer people would be prevented from attending college and that in turn would damage Ireland's knowledge-based economy. The protest gathered at Parnell Square at 13:30 before marching to Leinster House on Kildare Street. Despite extreme weather conditions which caused widespread traffic disruption across Ireland that week, 15,000 students were involved.

== Blockade at Paul Gogarty's office ==
On 4 December 2008, eleven FEE activists from UCD occupied the office of the Green Party Spokesperson on Education Paul Gogarty in Lucan, as part of a national day of protest across the country. The occupation lasted for about four hours until the activists and door were removed by the Gardaí. The "Lucan 11" were arrested but not charged for the incident. On the same day, over 20 FEE (Free Education for Everyone ) activists in Cork occupied a room in the President of UCC's office for over an hour before being removed by the Gardaí and almost 20 students staged an in-house protest at the constituency office of Éamon Ó Cuív in Galway for almost two hours.

== Referendums ==
In March 2009 the campaign's focus switched towards organising a national one day shutdown of third level education. In UCD a referendum was organised by FEE calling on the Students Union to organised a one-day shutdown of the college and campaign for a national shutdown which was passed by 83% of the vote (over 4000 students). Similar referendums were organised around the country.

== Blockade at the Department of Finance ==
On 16 April, students from both the National University of Ireland Maynooth (NUIM) and University College Dublin (UCD) branches of FEE staged a direct action protest at the Department of Finance. While almost 30 students held a demonstration outside the department, another 15 were inside. This achieved mass-media coverage on radio at the time, being picked up by Newstalk, Q102, Phantom FM and FM104, while also making it online and into the next days editions of many papers including the Irish Independent.

The students stayed inside the department building for almost three hours. No arrests were made in the end and the group left of their own free will, after handing in a letter to the department. A banner proclaiming 'UCD AGAINST FEES!' was hung over the stairs inside the building, while outside the NUIM banner read 'EDUCATION NOT EMIGRATION'.

== Occupation of Brian Walsh's constituency office ==
Nine FEE students participated in a peaceful sit-down protest by occupying the constituency office of Fine Gael TD and former mayor Brian Walsh in Bohermore, Galway, around midday on 30 November 2011. They unfurled a banner on the roof with the message, "FREE EDUCATION NOTHING LESS". They were imprisoned by the police and released a short time later.

== Enda Kenny egging ==
On 29 November 2012, members of FEE UCD disrupted the opening of the UCD Student Centre and Sports Complex by Enda Kenny in protest against education cuts. Two eggs were thrown at Kenny before four students were forcibly removed from the centre by Gardaí. One missed him and hit the vice president for students by accident.

== See also ==
- 2009 Irish budget
- 2010 student protest in Dublin
