= Kildare Barracks =

- Naas, County Kildare
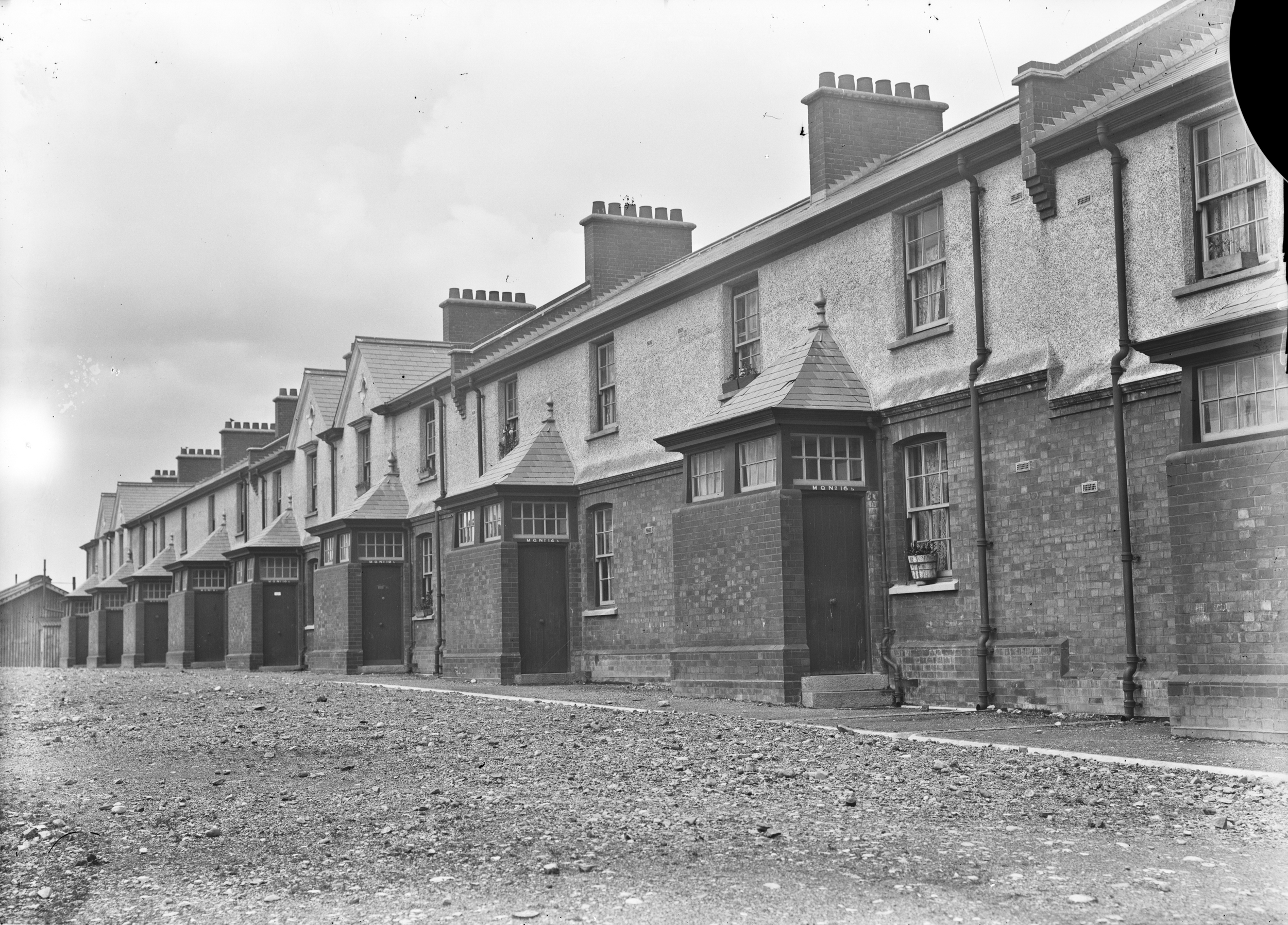
- Married quarters in the barracks

Site information
- Type: Barracks
- Operator: (Republic of Ireland) Irish Army

Location
- Location within Ireland
- Coordinates: 53.1570°N 6.9019°W

Site history
- Built: 1902
- Built for: War Office
- In use: 1902–1998

Garrison information
- Garrison: Royal Field Artillery

Kildare Barracks, also known as Magee Barracks, was a military installation in Kildare, County Kildare in Ireland. Built in the early 20th century, the barracks closed in the 1998.

== History ==
The barracks were commissioned for the use of the Royal Field Artillery on land acquired from Maurice FitzGerald, 6th Duke of Leinster in 1900. Initially, consisting of wooden huts and drill halls, it accommodated 1,700 British gunners from completion of the barracks in April 1902.

The barracks were the venue for the killing of Lieutenant John Wogan-Browne in an armed robbery by the Irish Republican Army in February 1922. After the barracks were secured by the forces of the Irish Free State later that month, they accommodated the Irish Artillery Corps for much of the 20th century.

In 1938, the installation was renamed Magee Barracks in memory of Gunner James Magee who took part in the Battle of Ballinamuck during the Irish Rebellion of 1798.

The barracks closed in 1998 and the 50 acres (20 ha) site was sold to a developer for €8.2 million in late 2016. The site was subsequently redeveloped, principally for residential use.

== See also ==
- List of Irish military installations
