= Rockhill House Estate =

- Interactive map of Rockhill House Estate
- 54.9332°N 7.7743°W
- Location: Rockhill, Letterkenny, County Donegal, Ireland (NIAH Ref: 40906102)

History
- Built: 17th century

Site notes
- Architect: John Hargrave (1824 extension)
- Architectural style: Georgian architecture
- Governing body: Donegal County Council (Protected Structure)
- Website: www.rockhillhouse.ie

Rockhill House Estate is a 17th-century country house and estate located in Letterkenny, County Donegal, Ireland. Historically the seat of the Stewart family and later an Irish Army post, the estate currently operates as a hotel, spa, and event venue. The property is recorded on the National Inventory of Architectural Heritage (NIAH reference 40906102) and the Donegal County Council Record of Protected Structures.

The estate comprises approximately 130 acres (53 ha), including roughly 100 acres (40 ha) of ancient woodland. Its architectural history is defined by a substantial four documented extensions and redesigns, one by then owners John Vandeleur Stewart and Lady Helen Toler-Stewart by the Dublin architect John Hargrave., another by Irish state and Irish Defense Forces throughout the 20th century and most recently by the Molloy family.

== History ==
=== Origins and early ownership ===
The lands at Rockhill were part of the Plantation of Ulster granted to Sir Thomas Cooch in the 17th century. The estate, originally known as Corr, was later occupied by Captain Thomas Chambers from approximately 1660.

In 1693, the Chambers family constructed a manor house on the site. The estate was sold to John Vandeleur Stewart of Ards in February 1832.

=== Stewart ownership and architectural development ===
John Vandeleur Stewart (1802–1872), an ornithologist and High Sheriff of Donegal, commissioned a remodel the house. Completed in 1824, the works included a three-storey range with a full-height three-bay bowed projection to the south-east elevation. The interior features a triple-height hall with paired Corinthian pilasters and a cast iron stair balustrade.

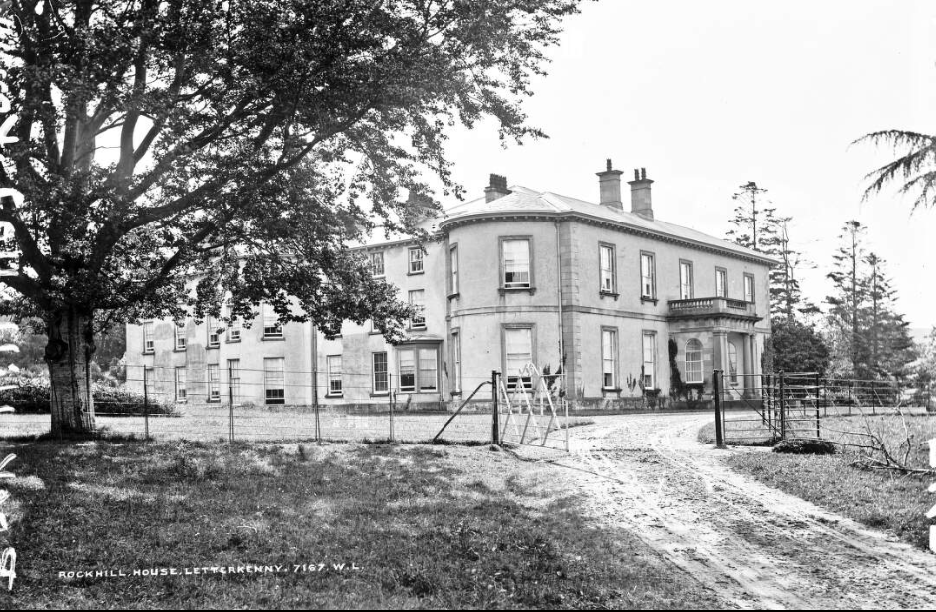
A historical photograph of Rockhill House taken around 1865–1914 by Robert French.

A photograph of Rockhill House taken by Robert French for the Lawrence Collection (c. 1865–1914) is held at the National Library of Ireland. Following the death of John Vandeleur Stewart in 1872, the estate passed to Sir Charles John Stewart. The building was sold in October 1936.

=== Military use (1940–2009) ===
The Irish Defence Forces occupied Rockhill on a permanent basis from 1969 until 2009, when the barracks was closed as part of national government spending reviews. Rockhill Barracks served as the headquarters for the 24th Infantry Battalion.

=== Restoration (2014–present) ===
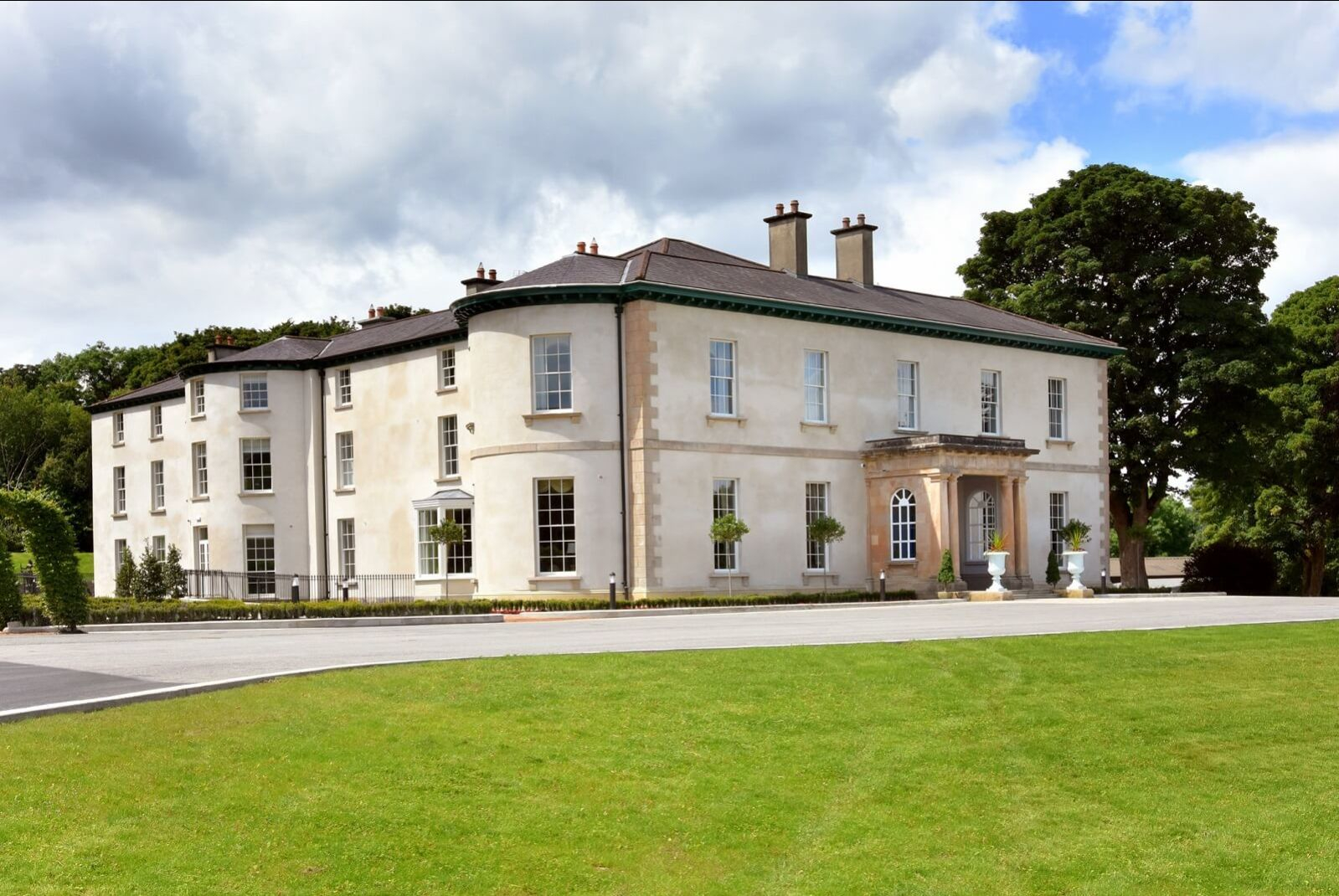
The restored exterior of Rockhill House on the Rockhill House Estate in Letterkenny, County Donegal, Ireland.

In August 2014, the estate was purchased by the Molloy family. A three-year restoration followed, focusing on structural repairs and the replication of original interior features including cornices, ceiling roses, and ironwork.

== Architecture and estate management ==
=== Main house and structural restoration ===
The interior of the main house retains its 19th-century floor plan, which includes historic drawing rooms, a library, and a basement cellar. During the 2014-2017 restoration, an Orangerie constructed of glass and ironwork was integrated into the U-shaped internal courtyard of the building. This structure functions as a thermal buffer, providing passive climate regulation that protects the original 17th-century masonry from thermal stress while facilitating natural ventilation. Guest accommodations are split between the main house and the converted 19th-century Coach House within the stable courtyard.

=== The Wellhouse ===
The estate's former mill, grain store, and stables have been repurposed into a wellness facility known as The Wellhouse. The structural conversion retained original 19th-century oak beams and restored the original stone work from the former stable block. The facility incorporates hydrotherapy and Nordic-inspired thermotherapy elements into the historic footprint.

=== The Church and military arboretum ===
A former Irish Army recreation hall and chapel, used during the property's time as a military barracks, has been structurally preserved and converted into a dining venue called The Church. The restoration retained the building's functional architectural structure with the steel suspension grid metalwork of the original dropped ceiling being on display. Adjacent to this structure, an arboretum was planted in memory of fallen Irish soldiers, acknowledging their role in United Nations peacekeeping missions and reflecting the site's military heritage.

=== Grounds and biodiversity ===
The 130-acre estate is managed with a focus on conservation. Approximately 100 acres are designated as ancient woodland, supporting native flora and fauna. The estate maintains active apiaries to monitor local pollinator health and utilizes the woodland for raptor conservation and falconry programs. Produce for the estate is sourced partially from a restored walled kitchen garden on the grounds.

== Recognition ==
The estate has been recognised by several tourism and hospitality organisations, including:

- Fáilte Ireland / Discover Ireland approved accommodation.
- Irish Independent "Fab 50".

== See also ==
- Rockhill Barracks
- Wild Atlantic Way
