= Castlebar Military Barracks =

Military installation in County Mayo, Ireland

- Castlebar, County Mayo
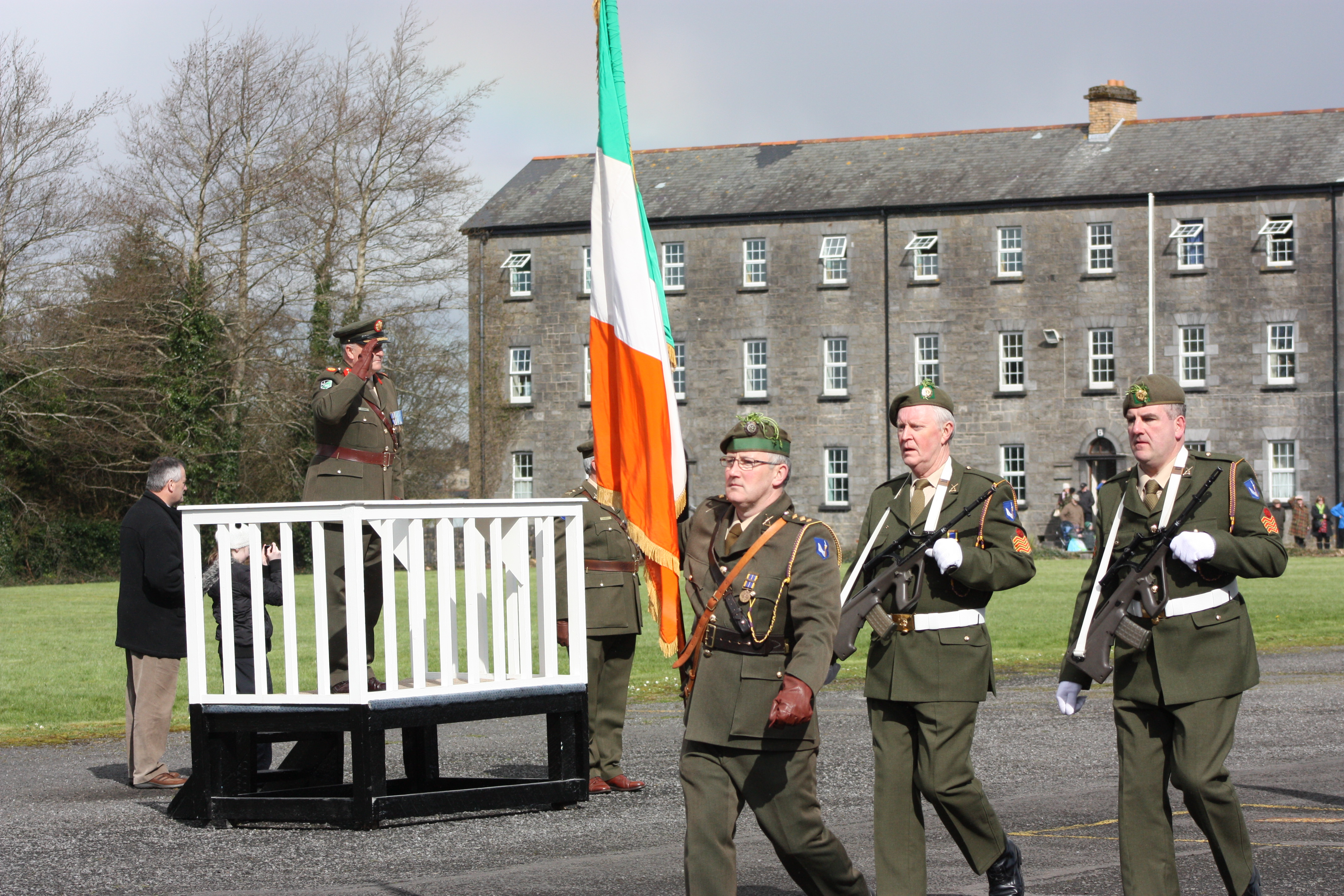
- Closure ceremony at Castlebar Barracks

Site information
- Type: Barracks
- Owner: Mayo County Council
- Operator: (Republic of Ireland) Irish Army

Location
- Location within Ireland
- Coordinates: 53.855°N 9.296°W

Site history
- Built: 1834
- Built for: War Office
- In use: 1834-2012

Garrison information
- Garrison: 3rd Battalion, the Connaught Rangers

Castlebar Military Barracks, sometimes referred to as Mitchell Barracks, was a military installation at Rock Square in Castlebar, County Mayo in Ireland. The barracks was closed in 2012 and sold to Mayo County Council with an agreement to lease a portion of the barracks back to the Defence Forces for the use of a reserve unit.

== History ==
The infantry barracks at Castlebar, which were built on the site of an old castle, were completed in 1834. The barracks became the home of the 3rd Battalion, the Connaught Rangers in the late 19th century and it was at Castlebar that the battalion was disbanded in 1901.

A part of barracks was burnt down by the Irish Republican Army in spring 1922. Blocks E/F and J/K/L and the hospital were completely destroyed before the site was secured by the forces of the Irish Free State in summer 1922.

On the night of 28 February 1957 the St. Patricks Boys National School building was burnt down, on 3 April 1957 the school was temporally relocated to blocks G and H of the barracks. A replacement school building was opened on 9 November 1961.

The barracks, which latterly were used as a training camp by the Reserve Defence Forces, closed in March 2012 and the site has since been acquired by Mayo County Council.

On 29 January 2016 when workers were probing the ceiling of block A they discovered a human skull.

Although the barracks has sometimes been referred to as "Mitchell Barracks", local media simply refers to it as "Castlebar Military Barracks".

== See also ==
- List of Irish military installations
