= Fermoy Barracks =

Former military base in County Cork, Ireland

- Dún Mainistir Fhear Maí
- Fermoy, County Cork
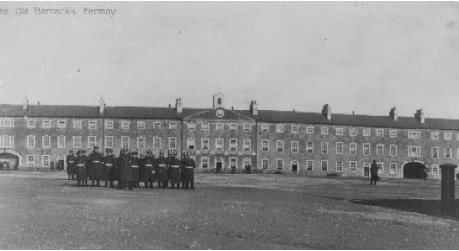
- The Old Barracks, Fermoy

Site information
- Type: Barracks
- Operator: (Republic of Ireland) Irish Army

Location
- Location within Ireland
- Coordinates: 52.1436°N 8.2801°W

Site history
- Built: 1801-1806
- Built for: War Office
- In use: 1806-1922

Fermoy Barracks (Irish: Dún Mainistir Fhear Maí) was a military installation in Fermoy, County Cork.

== History ==
The East Barracks were designed and built by Abraham Hargrave on a site provided by John Anderson between 1801 and 1806. In June 1808 Sir Arthur Wellesley used the barracks as an assembly point from where 9,000 troops would depart for the Cove of Cork and then sail for Portugal to take part in the Peninsular War.

The West Barracks and military hospital were added to the complex in 1809. The barracks were burnt to the ground by a group of Irish Republican Army irregulars after the British Army left in 1922. The site subsequently became known as "the showgrounds" and is now occupied by Fermoy Rugby Club.

== See also ==
- List of Irish military installations
