= Waterford Barracks =

- Beairic Phort Láirge
- Waterford
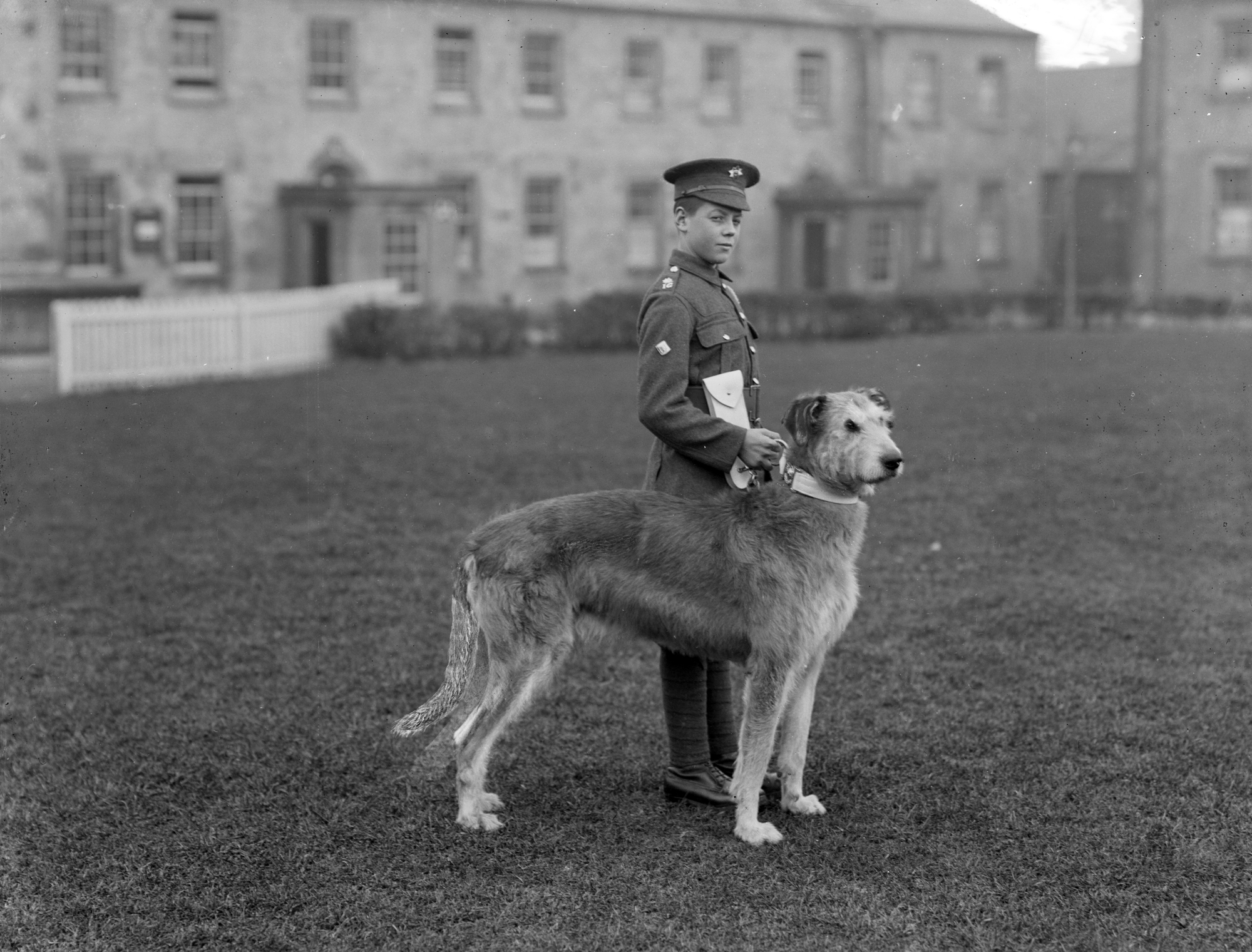
- Irish Guards Mascot at Waterford Barracks in 1917

Site information
- Type: Barracks
- Operator: (Republic of Ireland) Irish Army

Location
- Location within Ireland
- Coordinates: 52.25525°N 7.11986°W

Site history
- Built: circa 1799
- Built for: War Office
- In use: 1799–1922

Waterford Barracks (Irish: Beairic Phort Láirge) was a military installation in Waterford, Ireland.

== History ==
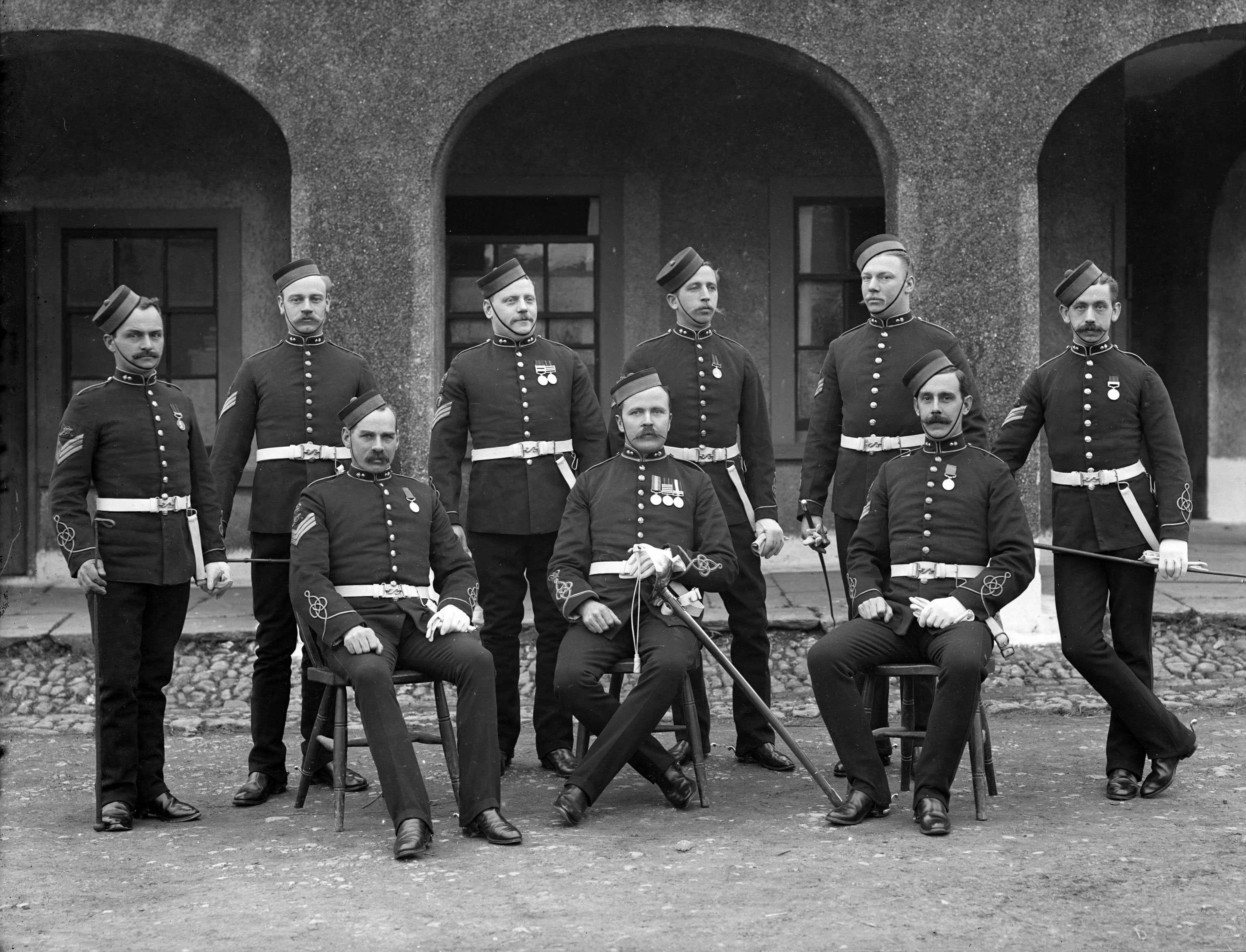
Group of Royal Artillery Sergeants at the Cavalry Barracks, Waterford, c1900 (National Library of Ireland)

There were two sets of barracks in Waterford: the infantry barracks on the North side of Barrack Street and the artillery barracks on the South side. It is not known when the infantry barracks were established but it is accepted that the artillery barracks were built in the aftermath of the Irish Rebellion and completed at the end of the 18th century. During the First World War the artillery barracks, at that time known as the cavalry barracks, served as the 1st cavalry depot providing accommodation for the 5th Royal Irish Lancers, the 9th Queen's Royal Lancers, the 12th Royal Lancers, the 16th The Queen's Lancers, the 17th Lancers and the 21st Lancers.

During the Irish Civil War the barracks were seized by the anti-treaty forces; however in the ensuing battle there were many direct hits from gunfire. By the end of the Irish Civil War the infantry barracks were in a very dilapidated state and the artillery barracks had been largely destroyed when a direct hit exploded in the magazine. The artillery barracks were gone by the 1930s and were replaced by St. Carthage's Avenue.

== See also ==
- List of Irish military installations
