= Rockhill Barracks =

- Beairic Chnoc na Carraige
- Letterkenny
- Rockhill Barrackst

Site information
- Type: Barracks
- Operator: (Republic of Ireland) Irish Army

Location
- Location within Ireland
- Coordinates: 54.93374°N 7.77513°W

Site history
- Built: 17th century
- In use: 1969–2008

Rockhill Barracks (Irish: Beairic Chnoc na Carraige) was an Irish Army barracks located in Letterkenny, County Donegal. The barracks was closed, in early 2009, due to the Great Recession. The site was subsequently restored and reopened as Rockhill House Estate, a luxury hotel, spa and wellness center, and wedding and events venue in 2017.

== History ==
Rockhill House is a 30-room period building originally built as a manor house in the 17th century for the gentry. Captain Thomas Chambers is the earliest recorded occupier of the house in 1660. The present structure dates from 1824 and is a listed building. Rockhill House was occupied by The Irregulars during the Irish Civil War. They were removed from the building by a pro-treaty crowd who were led by Letterkenny native James McMonagle. Rockhill House which houses the barracks was later privately owned by Sir Charles John Stewart. His two sons were killed during World War I. He sold the building in October 1936, through selling agent John King Robinson, due to the fear of attacks from the Irish Republican Army. The estate was subsequently sold in various lots in January 1937 to the Commissioners of Public Works.

During years of vacancy the building was used as a Preparatory Irish College. The premises was used by The 24th Battalion from 1969 to 1973. Rockhill also hosted military combatants before members of the "B" company of the 28th Infantry settled there in 1973. The barracks opened in 1969 and covers 29 acres (120,000 m^{2}) of land. The then Taoiseach, Jack Lynch, deployed Irish troops to the border during The Troubles in Northern Ireland.

There is evidence that golf was played at Rockhill before the 20th century, long before Letterkenny Golf Club was established in 1913. A steward wrote to his master stating that golf was being played on the land of Major General ACH Stewart. In a letter he stated "Mr Chambers, Manager of the Ulster Bank, Dr Carre and a few others been playing golf on the lawn starting at McDaid's old lodge and going across into the Fort Field".

== Closure ==
Closure led to a public rally

Due to the 2008 Budget cutbacks on military spending the barracks was forced to close. 135 personnel moved to Finner Camp in Ballyshannon on 31 January 2009. Willie O'Dea, Minister for Defence, who defended the closure, said "There were too many army barracks for an army and a country of Ireland's size". Local people protested and stated that "the Government was walking on the people and the proposals would mean the loss of €6.5 million to the local economy". Dessie Larkin, a local councillor, said "I think it is a huge mistake to leave the north of the county without an army presence. The county would be cut off if it was blown up. What do people do in north Donegal now if there is a flooding crisis or other disaster?"

=== Protest ===
A protest march was held in Letterkenny on Saturday 15 November 2008 in objection to the barracks closure. It began at the Bus Éireann depot at 1.30pm and came to a climax at the Market Square. The protest was organised by the Donegal Steering Group Against Barrack Closures who include former Rockhill service personnel. Fine Gael politician Dinny McGinley was forced to leave the Dáil after he caused a row with Willie O'Dea. When O'Dea failed to answer McGinley's request for him to visit Donegal, the Donegal TD demanded that he prove whether he is "a man or a mouse". Leas Ceann Comhairle, Brendan Howlin asked McGinley to leave when he repeatedly shouted at O'Dea.

An open day was held at the barracks on 14 January 2009 and a final mass was celebrated by army chaplain, Fr. Alan Ward, on 18 January 2009. On Wednesday, 28 January, soldiers marched down the Barracks Avenue for the last time before proceeding to march from the courthouse to the library on the town's main street.

== Current use ==
Following the departure of the Irish Defence Forces in early 2009, Rockhill House and the wider estate were sold at public auction in August 2014. The property was acquired by the Molloy family for €670,000 and subsequently underwent a three-year restoration between 2014 and 2017.

The estate reopened in 2017 as Rockhill House Estate, a luxury country house hotel comprising 27 bedrooms, The Wellhouse thermotherapy spa, and The Church Restaurant and Bar. The hotel is situated on the Wild Atlantic Way and has been listed in The Irish Times Top 50 Places to Stay in Ireland and recognised by Georgina Campbell Guides, among other awards.

== Proposals ==
A number of abandoned proposals were made for the use of the house and estate. A not-for-profit group, Rockhill House Heritage Association, campaigned from 2009 to have Rockhill protected and developed. The group saw the site's development as a possible "flagship tourism project".

On 25 July 2014, it was announced that Rockhill House would be sold at public auction during August 2014. It was acquired by John Molloy Snr and family for €670,000.

== Publications ==
Lt.-Col. Declan O'Carroll, commanding officer at the barracks for several periods in the 1980s and 1990s, published a 28-page history of Rockhill House in 1984. It was revised in 1994 and 1998.

== See also ==
- List of Irish military installations
