= Deposit interest retention tax =

Deposit interest retention tax (DIRT; Irish: Cáin Choinneála ar Ús Taisce) is a form of tax on interest earned on bank accounts in Republic of Ireland that was first introduced in the 1980s. In Ireland, income from any source is reckonable for taxation purposes. The Revenue Commissioners believed that the large majority of interest earners were declining to report it and that the most efficient method to collect at least the basic rate tax would be to deduct it at source. After PAYE, it was Ireland's second experience of a withholding tax.

== Rates ==
=== Current Rate ===
DIRT is deducted at source by financial institutions. The current rate of DIRT is 33%, having been reduced from higher rates in preceding years.

=== Higher DIRT Rate ===
A 'higher rate' of 36% applied to some interest up until the end of 2013. This applied where interest could not be calculated at least annually or could not be determined until it was paid.

== Exemptions and Refunds ==
People who are permanently incapacitated, as well as people who are at least 65 years old and receive income less than the exemption limit (currently €18,000), may claim a refund of DIRT or may submit an appropriate form to their banks or financial institutions to have interest paid free of DIRT.

== History ==
It was controversial because taxpayers cannot withhold it in protest because it is taken at source. Some argued that it discourages saving among low-income families, who would not otherwise be liable for taxation, but who might also not understand the need to claim exemption.

== Evasion ==
In the late 1990s a parliamentary inquiry under Jim Mitchell, TD, established the existence of a culture of encouraging tax evasion within Irish banks, which had allowed wealthy customers to set up non-resident (off-shore, international) bank accounts into which money was transferred, enabling the account holder to avoid paying DIRT. (Such accounts in theory should only have been set up by foreign investors, who would of course pay any tax due to their local authorities.) Thousands of tax-evaders were prosecuted as were leading banks, producing hundreds of millions of Irish pounds of the Irish Exchequer through financial settlements and fines. Several famous Irish people have been found evading the tax, including (former) Minister for Justice Pádraig Flynn. The Committee was of the view that the Central Bank of Ireland had an inappropriate and outmoded approach to supervision in the context of the growing sophistication of banking and the changing role of banks. It also found there was an insufficient concern with ethics and supervision other than from the standpoint of a traditional and narrow concern with prudential supervision in the Central Bank. The Chairman of the inquiry was "shocked and horrified" at the "careless and reckless" manner in which the Governor had quoted false statistics to the Public Accounts subcommittee.

== See also ==
- Taxation in the Republic of Ireland
- Retention tax
