= 2011 Irish general election =

Election to the 31st Dáil

- 25 February 2011

166 seats in Dáil Éireann (Note: Including Séamus Kirk, returned automatically for Louth as outgoing Ceann Comhairle.) 84 seats needed for a majority
- Turnout: 69.9% ▲2.9 pp (Note: Due to discrepancies in the electoral register, official turnout figures for Irish elections are not regarded as reliable. A 2016 Oireachtas study estimated that turnout in 2011 was 73 per cent of eligible adults.)
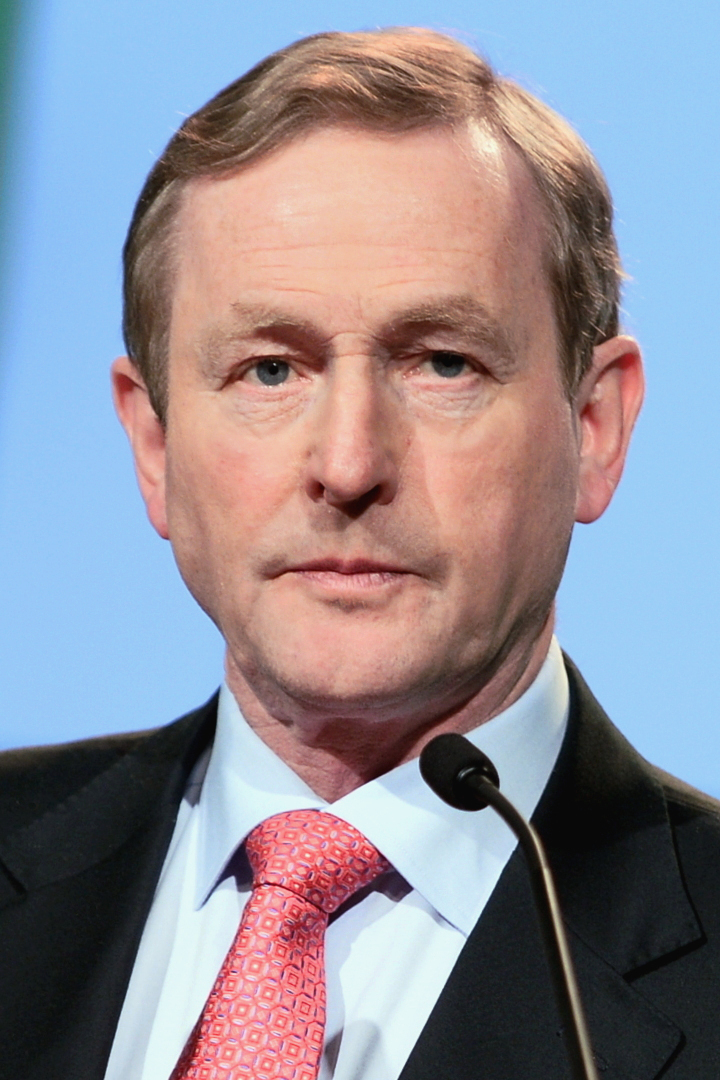

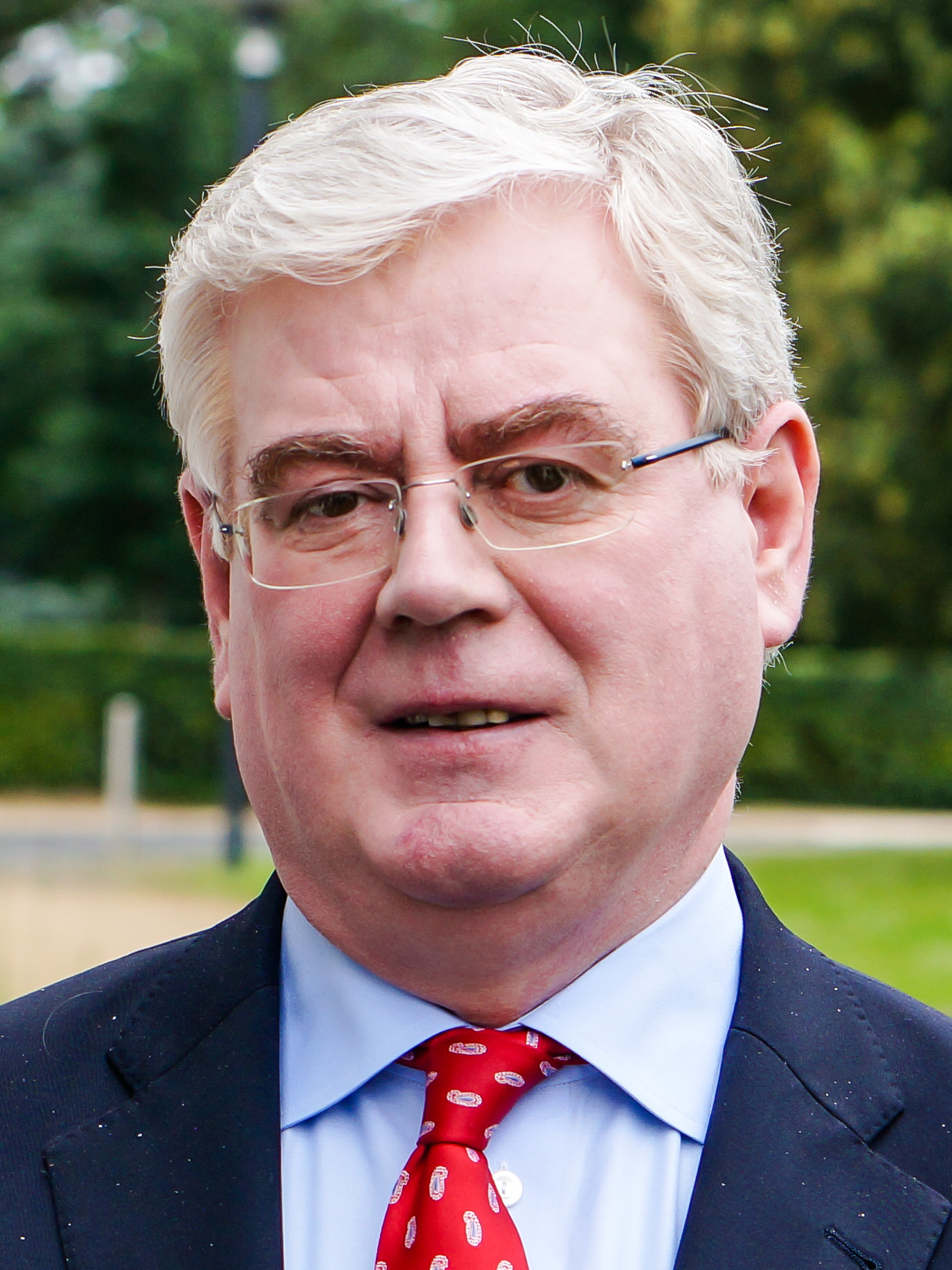

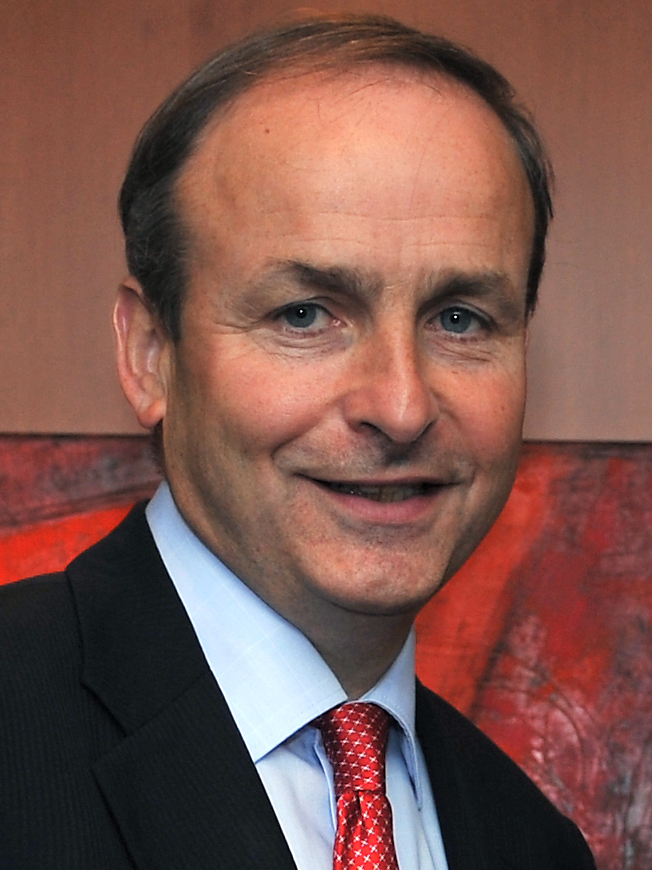

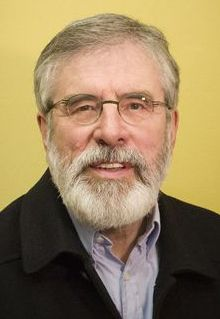

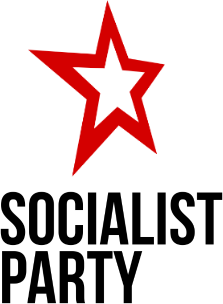

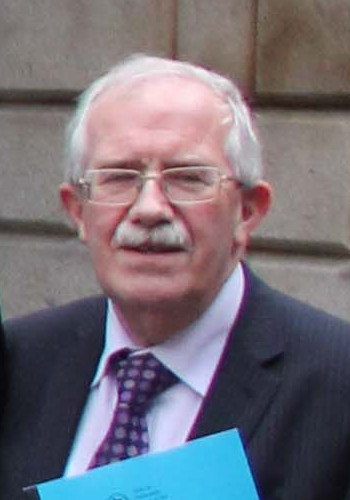

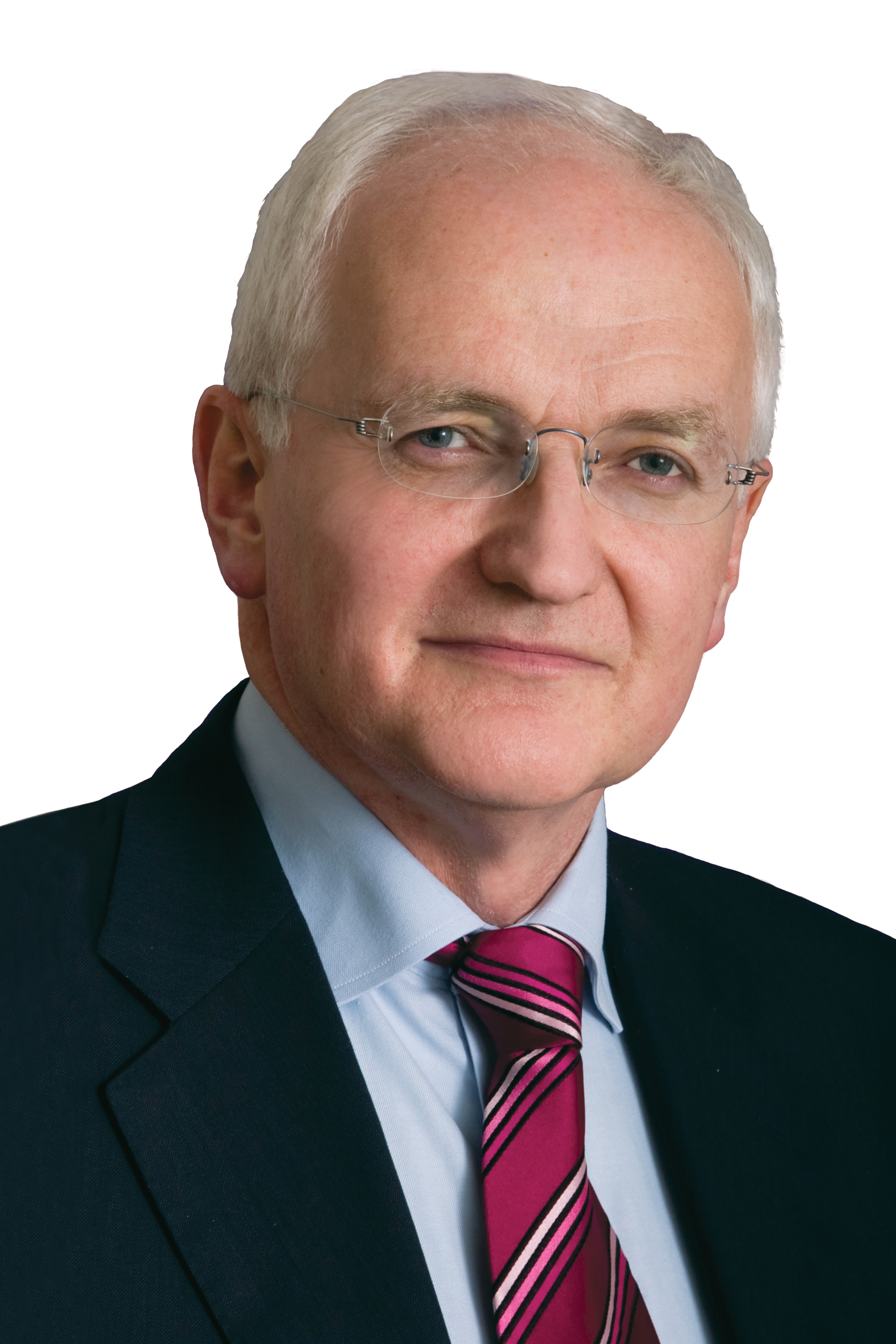
	First party	Second party	Third party
Leader	Enda Kenny	Eamon Gilmore	Micheál Martin
Party	Fine Gael	Labour	Fianna Fáil
Leader since	2 June 2002	6 September 2007	26 January 2011
Leader's seat	Mayo	Dún Laoghaire	Cork South-Central
Last election	51 seats, 27.3%	20 seats, 10.1%	78 seats, 41.6%
Seats won	76	37	20
Seat change	▲25	▲17	▼58
Popular vote	801,628	431,796	387,358
Percentage	36.1%	19.4%	17.4%
Swing	▲8.8 pp	▲9.3 pp	▼24.2 pp
	Fourth party	Fifth party	Sixth party
			PBP
Leader	Gerry Adams	Collective leadership (Note: The Socialist Party, People Before Profit and the Workers and Unemployed Action contested the general election under the joint banner of the United Left Alliance.)	Collective leadership
Party	Sinn Féin	Socialist Party	People Before Profit
Alliance		United Left Alliance	United Left Alliance
Leader since	13 November 1983 (Note: Although Adams had been president of Sinn Féin since 1983, its leader in Dáil Éireann since 1997 had been Caoimhghín Ó Caoláin.)	—	—
Leader's seat	Louth (won seat) (Note: Until 2011, Adams had represented Belfast West in the House of Commons and the Northern Ireland Assembly. He resigned both seats to stand for the Dáil.)	—	—
Last election	4 seats, 6.9%	0 seats, 0.6%	0 seats, 0.4%
Seats won	14	2	2
Seat change	▲10	▲2	▲2
Popular vote	220,661	26,770	21,551
Percentage	9.9%	1.2%	1.0%
Swing	▲3.0 pp	▲0.6 pp	▲0.6 pp
	Seventh party	Eighth party
Leader	Séamus Healy	John Gormley
Party	Workers and Unemployed	Green
Alliance	United Left Alliance
Leader since	1985	17 July 2007
Leader's seat	Tipperary South (won seat) (Note: Séamus Healy had previously represented Tipperary South from 2000 to 2007.)	Dublin South-East (lost seat)
Last election	0 seats, 0.3%	6 seats, 4.7%
Seats won	1	0
Seat change	▲1	▼6
Popular vote	8,818	41,039
Percentage	0.4%	1.8%
Swing	▲0.1 pp	▼2.9 pp
Taoiseach before election
Brian Cowen
Fianna Fáil
Taoiseach after election
Enda Kenny
Fine Gael

The 2011 Irish general election took place on 25 February 2011 to elect the 166 members of Dáil Éireann, the lower house of Ireland's parliament, the Oireachtas. Held amid a sharp economic downturn and the eurozone crisis, the election swept Fianna Fáil from power on one of the largest swings in Europe since 1945 and resulted in a Fine Gael–Labour Party coalition with a record majority.

Traditionally Ireland's dominant party and in government since 1997, Fianna Fáil's support declined after the near-collapse of the banking sector in 2008. With the economy in a deep recession, Taoiseach Brian Cowen's Fianna Fáil–Green Party coalition passed four austerity budgets and became highly unpopular. The government collapsed following its application for an international bailout in late 2010, which saw the so-called Troika take control of state fiscal policy. Cowen resigned as Fianna Fáil leader days before the Dáil was dissolved.

Because of the EU–IMF bailout, the election was seen internationally as significant for the future of the euro. While a glut of outgoing TDs opted to retire, a record number of candidates stood. With Fianna Fáil polling at historic lows, the campaign became a contest between the main opposition parties. Labour under Eamon Gilmore had surged to first place in polls in 2010, precipitating a failed attempt by Fine Gael frontbenchers to remove Enda Kenny as their party leader. By 2011, however, Fine Gael had a clear lead, and surveys during the campaign put them close to an overall majority. Amid high unemployment and a vast budget deficit, each party attacked the other: Labour were branded a high-tax option while Fine Gael were accused of favouring brutal spending cuts.

The election saw Fianna Fáil slide to third place and lose more than two-thirds of its TDs, a record decline at a Dáil election. It was the party's worst-ever result by far; its vote collapsed with every social group and in every region. Three of the six sitting cabinet ministers who contested the election lost their seats, and the Green Party was wiped out entirely. Fine Gael, Labour and Sinn Féin each won record seat totals, and an increased number of independents were elected. For the first time in its history, Fine Gael became the largest party. After it and Labour agreed a programme for government, Enda Kenny was elected Taoiseach by the 31st Dáil on 9 March 2011.

== Background ==
=== Economic crisis and Fianna Fáil decline ===
In the twentieth century, Fianna Fáil was arguably the most successful political party in a European democracy. With a big-tent ethos focused on strong leadership, localism, and economic pragmatism, it had won the most seats at every election since 1932 and been in government for all but twenty-four years of its eight-decade existence. Bertie Ahern became party leader in 1994 and formed a coalition with the Progressive Democrats in 1997. During his first two terms as Taoiseach, Ahern presided over a booming economy, known as the Celtic Tiger; his governments pursued expansionary fiscal policies while overseeing rapid growth in the property sector and increased reliance on construction-related revenue. Ahern was the first Taoiseach to lead a coalition through multiple terms.

Despite voter fatigue after a decade in office, Fianna Fáil won the general election in May 2007 on a promise to keep the economy strong. It formed a coalition with the Green Party, the Progressive Democrats, and independents. The main opposition parties were Fine Gael, the Labour Party, and Sinn Féin. Bertie Ahern was the first Taoiseach elected to three consecutive terms since Éamon de Valera. It was the first time the Green Party had entered government; Trevor Sargent stood down as party leader soon afterwards and was succeeded by John Gormley. Following disclosures at the Mahon Tribunal and controversy over his private financial affairs, Ahern resigned in April 2008; Brian Cowen replaced him as Fianna Fáil leader and Taoiseach the following month. Having lost three-quarters of their Dáil seats at the 2007 election, the Progressive Democrats disbanded in 2009, though former leader Mary Harney continued to serve in cabinet as an independent.

Amid a steep decline in property prices and a wider downturn in the economy, the near-collapse of Irish banks in 2008 shook the state to its foundations. In September, the government intervened to guarantee bank liabilities totalling €440 billion, about ten times Ireland's existing national debt. Within weeks, as the coalition announced an early austerity budget, Fianna Fáil's polling declined to historic lows. Fine Gael became the largest party in local government at the 2009 elections, while the Green Party fell from eighteen seats on city and county councils to three. The same day, Fianna Fáil had a poor European Parliament election, losing its seat in Dublin for the first time ever. In opinion polls, the government's satisfaction rating barely exceeded 10 per cent. Across all surveys in 2009, Fine Gael averaged 33 per cent support; Fianna Fáil, 23 per cent; and Labour, 20 per cent.

=== Labour surge and Fine Gael leadership heave ===
In opposition since 1997, Fine Gael and the Labour Party ran on a joint platform in 2007. Fine Gael leader Enda Kenny, in place since 2002, stayed on after gaining twenty seats at the election, despite criticism of his campaign from the media and some of his own TDs. Pat Rabbitte resigned as Labour leader in August 2007 and was replaced by Eamon Gilmore, who pledged to take the party out of the shadow of Fianna Fáil and Fine Gael.

In June 2010, Labour reached 32 per cent in a poll for The Irish Times, putting them in the lead. Gilmore's personal popularity considerably outstripped Kenny's, and Labour was polling particularly well with middle-aged swing voters. The journalist Deaglán de Bréadún attributed the party's surge to its perceived success in forcing the resignation of John O'Donoghue as Ceann Comhairle after an expenses scandal.

After failing to declare confidence in Kenny during two TV appearances after the poll, Richard Bruton was sacked as Fine Gael deputy leader and finance spokesperson on 14 June. Bruton announced he would challenge for the party leadership and gained the support of most of the frontbench. Some in Bruton's camp expected Kenny to resign, but he vowed to fight on. Olivia Mitchell, a frontbencher who supported Bruton, told reporters that voters she spoke to could not imagine Kenny as Taoiseach. Nevertheless, Kenny won a vote of confidence from the parliamentary party later that week. His victory steadied Fine Gael, and by the beginning of 2011 the party had a commanding lead in polls again.

=== Troika arrival and government collapse ===
Brian Cowen's government had sought to avoid the need for an international bailout, passing deep cuts to public spending and attempting to broaden the tax base. The coalition had withstood two no-confidence motions, the resignation of Willie O'Dea from the cabinet over a legal controversy, finance minister Brian Lenihan's pancreatic cancer diagnosis, and a September 2010 interview with RTÉ in which Cowen was alleged to have been hungover. John Downing, deputy government press secretary at the time, wrote in 2013 that Fine Gael politicians had told him it suited their party for Cowen to stay in office as long as possible, so he would be responsible for unpopular economic measures.

The coalition's numerical position in the Dáil had gradually deteriorated from the margin of twelve by which Cowen had been elected Taoiseach. By November 2010, the government had a majority of three, while three Dáil seats had been vacant for more than six months. The previous May, the government had blocked an attempt by Sinn Féin to hold a by-election in Donegal South-West because a likely defeat was seen as a threat to its stability. Sinn Féin senator Pearse Doherty took a successful High Court action against the decision. The vote took place on 25 November and Doherty won the seat, with the Fianna Fáil candidate in third.

Although a general election was not required until July 2012, events in November 2010 forced an early dissolution. The same week as the by-election in Donegal, after days of denials and secrecy, it emerged that the government was negotiating an €85 billion bailout with the Eurogroup, the European Central Bank, and the International Monetary Fund. In effect, the so-called Troika was now controlling Irish economic policy. The Irish Times said of Fianna Fáil in an editorial: "The Republican Party's ideals are in tatters now." The Green Party called for a general election to be held in January 2011, but said it would facilitate vital pre-dissolution measures, including the 2011 budget. Cowen accepted this proposal but did not set an election date.

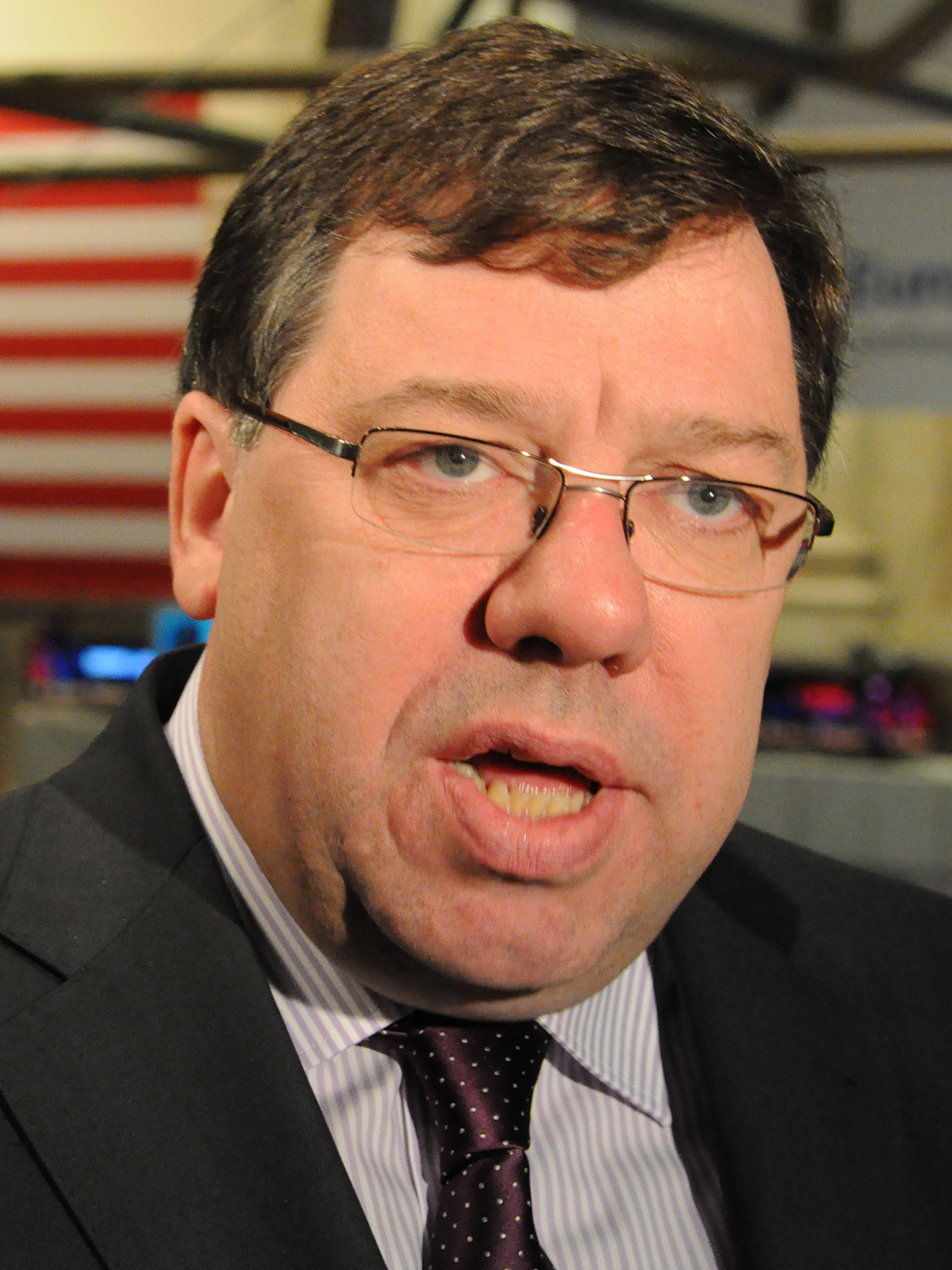
Taoiseach Brian Cowen (pictured in 2010) resigned as leader of Fianna Fáil in January 2011 and did not stand in the election.

Cowen's leadership of Fianna Fáil came into question following a further slump in polls to 14 per cent. Though he had intended to lead his party into the election, the Taoiseach faced a challenge from Micheál Martin, the Minister for Foreign Affairs. On 18 January 2011, Cowen won a vote of confidence from the Fianna Fáil parliamentary party; Martin then resigned from the cabinet while pledging loyalty to the government. Cowen attempted a reshuffle two days later, but following the resignations of five ministers who planned to retire at the election, the Green Party – who regarded the move as a cynical attempt to improve Fianna Fáil's electoral prospects – announced it would not vote to appoint their replacements. A standoff developed between the two parties. In response, the Fianna Fáil junior minister Conor Lenihan called for Cowen to resign. Cowen stood down as Fianna Fáil leader on 22 January, saying he would remain Taoiseach until after the general election on 11 March. The Green Party ministers formally resigned from government the next day, leaving a Fianna Fáil caretaker ministry of seven, the constitutional minimum. Four days after Cowen's announcement, the Fianna Fáil leadership was won by Micheál Martin.

Following the threat of no-confidence motions from Fine Gael and Labour, the government brought forward the election date from 11 March to 25 February in exchange for expediting the Finance Bill. The 30th Dáil was dissolved by President Mary McAleese on 1 February 2011.

== Electoral system ==
Under the Constitution of Ireland, once the Dáil was dissolved, an election had to take place within thirty days. The date was set for Friday 25 February and the first meeting of the 31st Dáil was scheduled for Wednesday 9 March. It was the first general election in February or in winter since 1987, and the first not to be held at a time of the outgoing Taoiseach's choosing since 1992.

Polls were open between 07:00 and 22:00 (WET). As usual, due to the possibility of adverse weather delaying the return of ballots, certain offshore islands voted earlier than the rest of the country. On Arranmore, Clare Island, Gola, Inishbiggle, Inishbofin (County Donegal), Inishfree, Inishturk and Tory Island, votes were cast on 23 February; the Aran Islands and Inishbofin (County Galway) went to the polls the following day.

Voting in general elections is not compulsory and turnout had increased in 2007 following a gradual decline since the 1980s. Across forty-three constituencies, 165 of the 166 seats in Dáil Éireann were up for election; the outgoing Ceann Comhairle (chairperson of the Dáil), Séamus Kirk, was returned automatically in Louth.

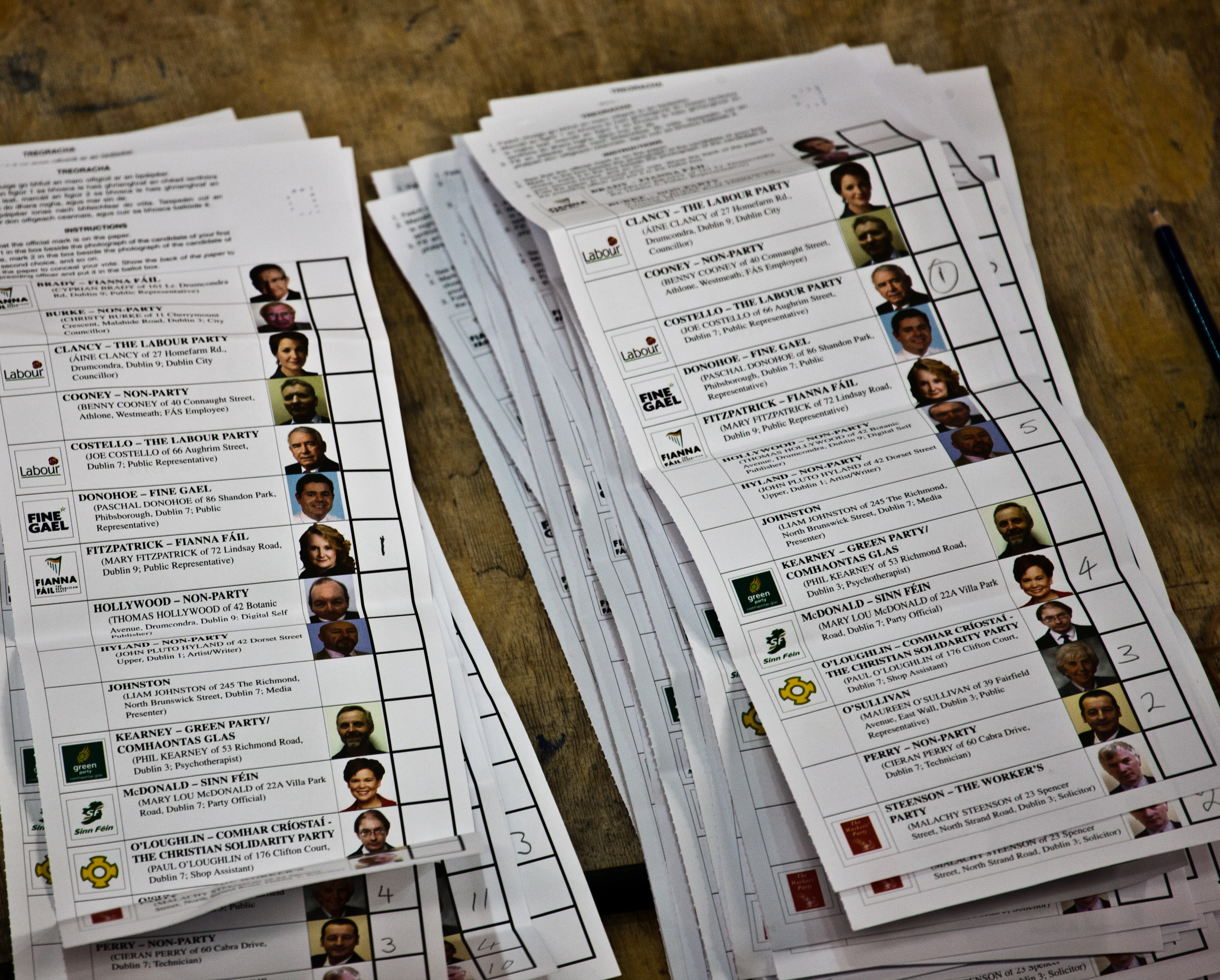
Completed ballot papers for the constituency of Dublin Central

As set out in the constitution, the election was conducted using proportional representation through the single transferable vote (PR–STV). Under this system, each voter was presented with a ballot paper listing all candidates standing in their constituency and could rank them in order of preference. Voters were not obliged to preference every candidate on the ballot paper. There was a quota of votes based on the number of seats available; each candidate who exceeded the quota was deemed elected. Their surplus votes were then distributed (a "transfer") to the remaining candidates in accordance with voters' preferences. Where no candidate had reached the quota, the lowest-ranking candidate or candidates were eliminated and their votes transferred until only enough candidates remained as there were seats to be filled.

The outcome of electoral contests in Ireland was often determined by local work, known pejoratively as "parish pump politics", rather than ideology. At constituency level, candidates could be competing directly with others from the same party. Large parties engaged in vote management to improve their chances of winning multiple seats in an area, trying to balance their vote evenly among their candidates; they did this by encouraging supporters to allocate preferences tactically, and dividing up territory between their contenders. For a party, running more candidates in a constituency meant increased diversity and geographic spread at the cost of votes scattering through preferences. Transfers were very significant, and Fianna Fáil's electoral success under Bertie Ahern had been partly attributed to an improved ability to win preferences.

Each constituency elected between three and five Teachtaí Dála (TDs). These relatively small PR constituencies meant Irish elections often produced outcomes favouring large parties (known as a "seat bonus") and disfavouring small ones, whose vote could be spread too thinly to win many seats. In 2007, for example, Sinn Féin had won 6.9 per cent of the vote but only 2.4 per cent of the available seats.

=== Constituency changes ===
Under the constitution, there had to be between 20,000 and 30,000 inhabitants for each Dáil member, with a broadly similar ratio throughout the country to prevent malapportionment. Following the five-yearly census in 2006, a Constituency Commission was established under High Court judge Iarfhlaith O'Neill to adjust boundaries in line with the constitution. The commission's report was published in 2007; its recommendations reflected high population growth in the Greater Dublin Area, particularly Counties Meath and Kildare, and became law in 2009.

The number of seats and constituencies remained unchanged. Among a large number of minor boundary changes, the main alterations were:

- Limerick East (5 seats) replaced by Limerick City (4 seats)
- Limerick West (3) replaced by Limerick (3)
- Kerry North (3) replaced by Kerry North–West Limerick (3)
- Dublin West (from 3 seats to 4 seats)
- Dún Laoghaire (from 5 to 4)
- Louth (from 4 to 5)

== Candidates ==
A record 566 candidates stood for election – nearly a hundred more than in 2007 – driven by a surge in the number of independents. By the time the government collapsed, party selections were at an advanced stage because the coalition had not been expected to last a full term. In 2007, Fianna Fáil and Fine Gael had recruited several personalities from sport and business; this time, there were fewer celebrity candidates, an outcome attributed to the failure of the journalist George Lee's career as a TD. 86 women put themselves forward, a numerical increase on 2007 but a decline in percentage terms. The two youngest candidates were both twenty-one years old; the oldest, Ian McGarvey, was eighty-one.

Fianna Fáil's organisation was in disarray in late 2010 and early 2011, and the leadership had less control over selections than usual. A glut of retirements helped the party reduce the size of its tickets to competitive levels, but local organisations sometimes selected more candidates than advised, most notably in Dún Laoghaire. Fianna Fáil stood 75 candidates, 31 fewer than in 2007 and three fewer than the number of seats it had won at the last election. The Green Party stood in every constituency, often with paper candidates. Despite poor polling over its time in government, the party believed it was important to contest everywhere, both for symbolic reasons and to improve its chances of getting the 2 per cent national vote needed to qualify for public funding.

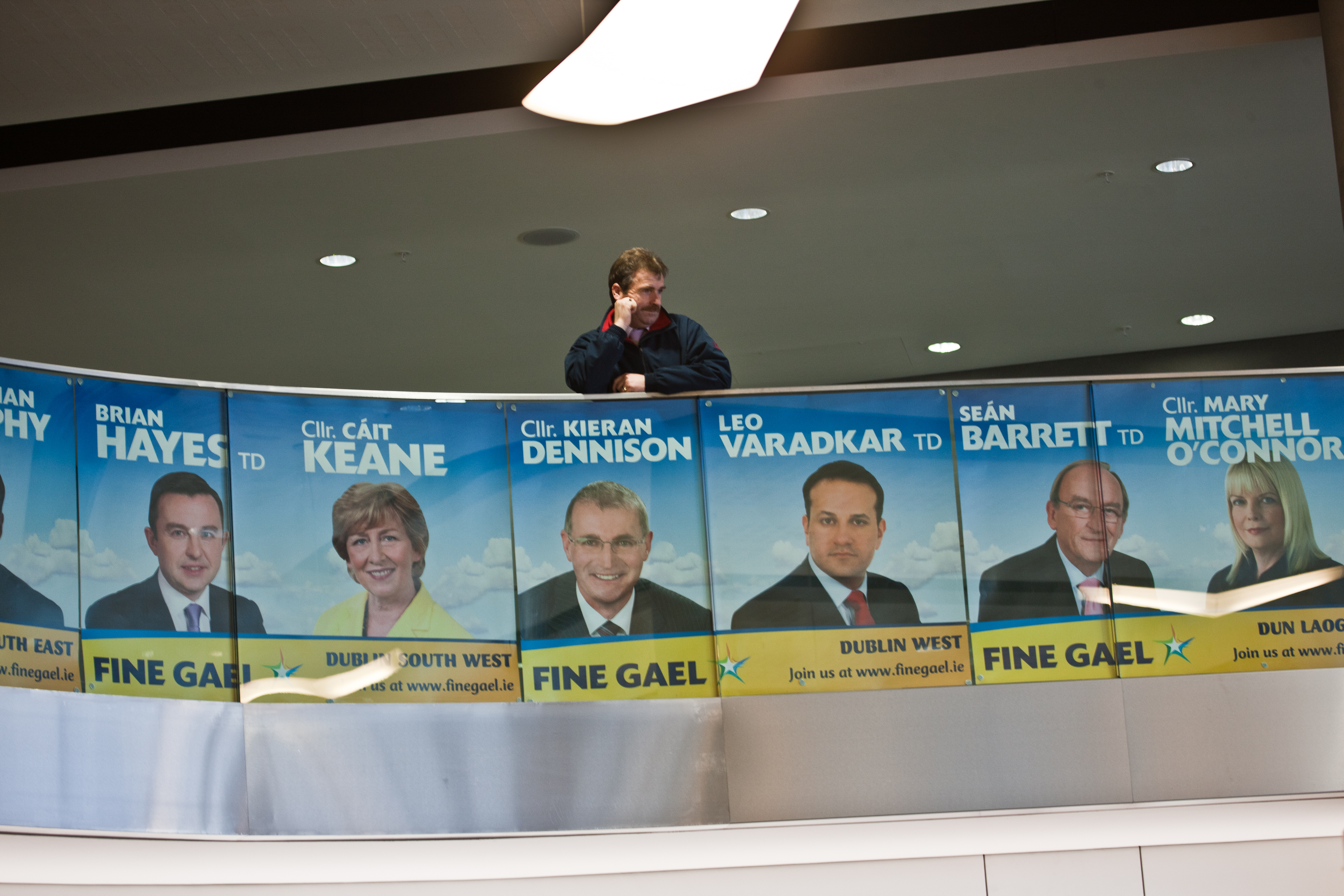
Fine Gael posters for candidates in Dublin

Fine Gael's selection process was centralised and tightly controlled, and it was the only party to run enough candidates to win a Dáil majority. The party engaged in strict vote management in some areas, especially Mayo and parts of Dublin. Labour's selection strategy was influenced by its experience at the 1992 election, when it was perceived to have stood too few candidates to take advantage of a spike in support. The party stood eighteen more candidates than in 2007 and all but one of its outgoing TDs had a running mate. Sinn Féin president and MP Gerry Adams announced in late 2010 that he would resign from the House of Commons and the Northern Ireland Assembly to contest the Dáil election in Louth.

=== Independents and new groups ===
During the economic crisis, the perceived failure of the established political forces motivated discussion of a potential new party. In 2010, a Sunday Independent poll found that a majority believed one was needed. Writing in 2012, the academic Liam Weeks remarked that while Ireland had fewer political parties than other European countries of its size during this period, voters had a long history of spurning new options, especially those not formed from splits or mergers of existing groups.

A number of public figures discussed forming a loose alliance called "Democracy Now", but the collapse of the government at the end of 2010 did not give them enough time to prepare. New Vision, a separate slate of independents, contested about half of constituencies. Several small left-wing groups combined to form the United Left Alliance: People Before Profit, the Socialist Party, Workers and Unemployed Action, and some former Labour Party members. Three of its candidates were former TDs. Also on the left, Fís Nua, a new party including several former Green Party members opposed to coalition, fielded a handful of candidates.

The public debate over the lack of experts in Irish politics may have contributed to an increased number of independent candidates with economic and financial credentials, including Shane Ross and Stephen Donnelly. Mick Wallace, a property developer, left-wing activist and the founder of Wexford Youths F.C., announced on television three weeks before the election that he would contest Wexford as an independent. Most other high-profile independents were former members of parties.

=== Retiring incumbents ===
A record thirty-nine TDs, almost a quarter of the total, stood down from the Dáil at the election, including four who had already resigned their seats before dissolution. Of the retirements, twenty-three were Fianna Fáil, nine were Fine Gael, four came from the Labour Party, one was Sinn Féin and two were independents.

Among the departures from the Fianna Fáil ranks were the Taoiseach, Brian Cowen, his predecessor, Bertie Ahern, and seven former ministers who had served under them. It was the first time a sitting Taoiseach had stood down at a general election. Amid the straitened economic circumstances, media attention focused on the termination payments and ministerial and Dáil pensions some from the party would receive upon retirement. Elsewhere, Mary Harney, the first female Tánaiste and the longest-serving female TD in history at the time, also retired from politics. Labour's Michael D. Higgins left the Dáil to contest the 2011 presidential election, which he won.

Constituency	Departing TD	Party
Carlow–Kilkenny	M. J. Nolan	Fianna Fáil
Cavan–Monaghan	Seymour Crawford	Fine Gael
Cavan–Monaghan	Rory O'Hanlon	Fianna Fáil
Clare	Tony Killeen	Fianna Fáil
Cork East	Ned O'Keeffe	Fianna Fáil
Cork North-Central	Bernard Allen	Fine Gael
Cork North-Central	Noel O'Flynn	Fianna Fáil
Cork North-West	Batt O'Keeffe	Fianna Fáil
Cork South-West	Jim O'Keeffe	Fine Gael
Cork South-West	P. J. Sheehan	Fine Gael
Donegal North-East	Niall Blaney	Fianna Fáil
Donegal North-East	Jim McDaid (Note: Resigned Dáil seat on 2 November 2010.)	Fianna Fáil
Dublin Central	Bertie Ahern	Fianna Fáil
Dublin Mid-West	Mary Harney	Independent (Note: Originally elected as a Progressive Democrats TD.)
Dublin North-East	Michael Woods	Fianna Fáil
Dublin North-West	Noel Ahern	Fianna Fáil
Dublin South	Tom Kitt	Fianna Fáil
Dublin South	George Lee (Note: Resigned Dáil seat on 8 February 2010.)	Fine Gael
Dublin South-Central	Seán Ardagh (Note: Resigned Dáil seat on 28 January 2011.)	Fianna Fáil
Dublin South-Central	Mary Upton	Labour Party
Galway East	Ulick Burke	Fine Gael
Galway East	Paul Connaughton Snr	Fine Gael
Galway East	Noel Treacy	Fianna Fáil
Galway West	Michael D. Higgins	Labour Party
Galway West	Pádraic McCormack	Fine Gael
Kerry South	Jackie Healy-Rae	Independent
Laois–Offaly	Olwyn Enright	Fine Gael
Laois–Offaly	Brian Cowen	Fianna Fáil
Limerick West	John Cregan	Fianna Fáil
Louth	Arthur Morgan	Sinn Féin
Louth	Dermot Ahern	Fianna Fáil
Mayo	Beverley Flynn	Fianna Fáil (Note: Originally elected as an independent TD.)
Meath East	Mary Wallace	Fianna Fáil
Meath West	Noel Dempsey	Fianna Fáil
Roscommon–South Leitrim	Michael Finneran	Fianna Fáil
Sligo–North Leitrim	Jimmy Devins	Fianna Fáil
Waterford	Martin Cullen (Note: Resigned Dáil seat on 24 March 2010.)	Fianna Fáil
Waterford	Brian O'Shea	Labour Party
Wicklow	Liz McManus	Labour Party

== Issues ==
The election was dominated by the fallout from the banking crisis and the EU–ECB–IMF "Troika" bailout in 2010. The opposition parties were critical of the government's decision to guarantee all bank liabilities in 2008; this had dramatically increased the state's risk exposure and put pressure on the value of Irish bonds, contributing to the need for external assistance. In late 2010, Labour leader Eamon Gilmore alleged that the government had known Anglo Irish Bank was insolvent in 2008 and accused Brian Cowen of "economic treason" for placing its debt burden on taxpayers. Cowen strongly rejected the claim.

As the first eurozone election to take place in a country facing the Euro area crisis, the vote was seen as important for the future of the currency. Fine Gael and Labour both proposed to renegotiate the Troika deal. Michael Noonan, Fine Gael's finance spokesperson, said the 5.8% interest rate demanded was likely to inhibit economic recovery and suggested that other European countries contribute to the recapitalisation of Irish banks. Economists criticised these proposals, saying they overstated the Irish government's leverage. Olli Rehn, the European Commissioner for Economic and Monetary Affairs and the Euro, said the terms of the bailout could not be renegotiated, but it might be possible to reduce the interest rate.

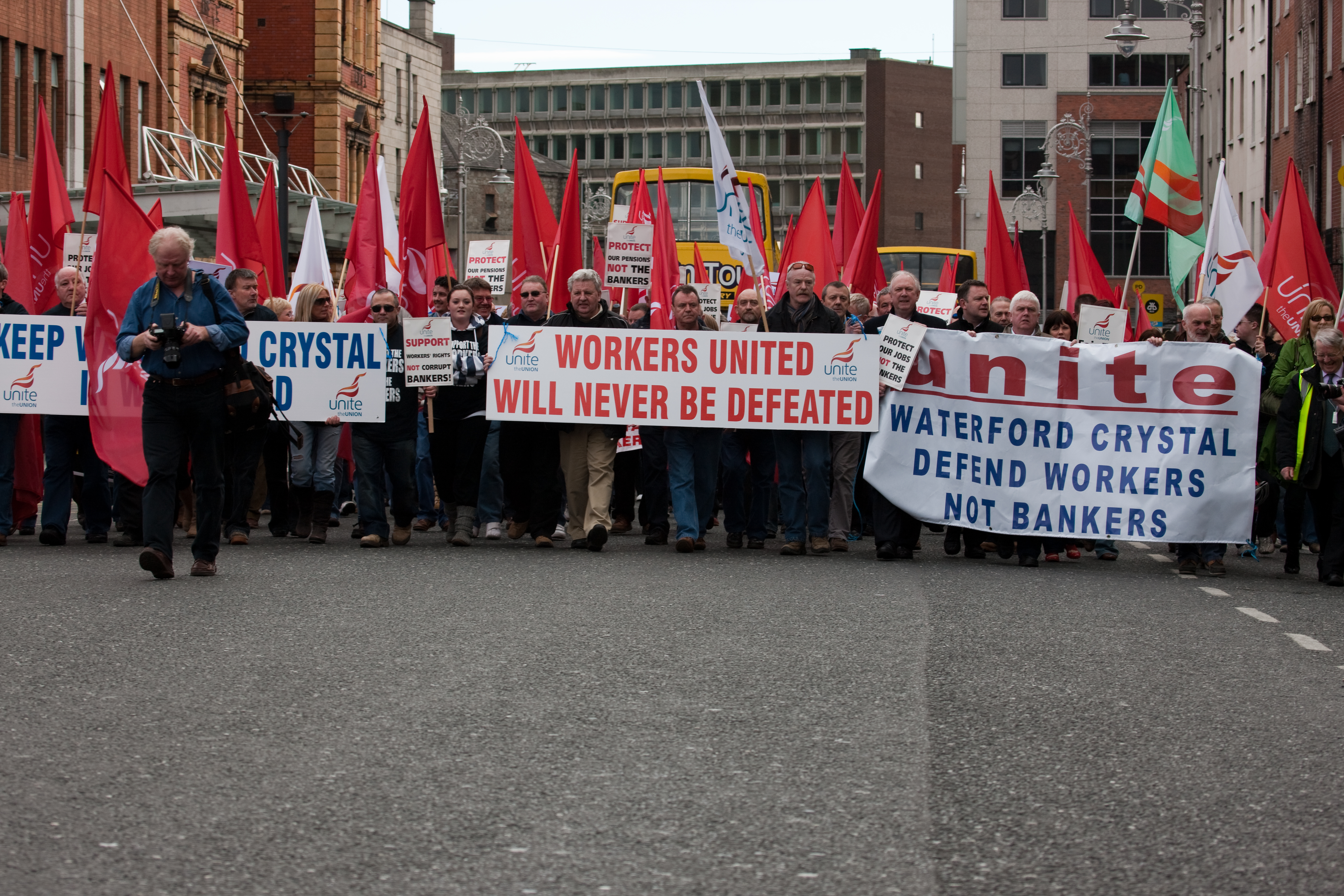
A February 2009 protest in Dublin against the government's handling of the economic crisis, organised by the Irish Congress of Trade Unions

At the time of the election, Ireland was emerging from a deep recession which had begun in late 2007. Almost half a million people were out of work, the unemployment rate stood at 13.4%, and emigration had sharply increased. The collapse of house prices meant that many people who had bought homes near the peak of the property bubble were now in negative equity. Despite the openness of Ireland's economy, voters overwhelmingly blamed Fianna Fáil for the crisis. Suggestions from Brian Lenihan, the Minister for Finance, that the economy was "turning the corner" in the months leading up to the Troika's arrival contributed to an atmosphere of distrust, as did justice minister Dermot Ahern's denial of a bailout in the days before it happened. Political scientists Michael Marsh and Slava Mikhaylov said that voters who perceived economic problems on the horizon in 2007 had been more likely to vote for Fianna Fáil, and this deepened their subsequent feelings of betrayal. They compared it to the collapse of the UK Conservative Party's economic credibility after Black Wednesday in 1992. Of her experience covering the election as a journalist, Olivia O'Leary wrote: "People wanted to show their wounds. Candidates were clung to like therapists, held on the doorsteps for ages. People felt cheated and betrayed but what hurt even more was that many of them felt they had been foolish."

Over the two and half years since the bank guarantee, the Fianna Fáil–Green government had introduced four austerity budgets. Among other measures, the coalition had reduced the availability of subsidised healthcare for old-age pensioners, created the Universal Social Charge to widen the tax base, established the National Asset Management Agency to isolate toxic assets from the wider banking system, and implemented across-the-board reductions in social welfare. The government and the Irish Congress of Trade Unions signed the Croke Park Agreement in 2010 to reduce the likelihood of strike action in the public sector and facilitate a programme of cost savings without further pay cuts or compulsory redundancies. Nevertheless, Ireland's government debt stood at €148 billion in 2010 (95 per cent of GDP) and the forecast deficit for 2011 was €15.7 billion. Under the Troika agreement, continued austerity measures were required. Fianna Fáil's manifesto largely restated the commitments in the EU–IMF deal. Fine Gael's "Five-Point Plan" advocated minimising tax rises on business and employment to stimulate job creation, and the sale of state assets to raise funds, for a total of 28% revenue raising to 72% spending cuts. Labour proposed an even mix of tax increases and spending reductions. Sinn Féin suggested a stimulus package to create jobs and the introduction of a wealth tax. Although Fine Gael and Labour did not run on a joint platform as they had in 2007, both parties shifted the language in their manifestos towards the centre ground, opening up space on the left for Sinn Féin, while a position on the economic right formerly occupied by the Progressive Democrats was taken up by Fianna Fáil.

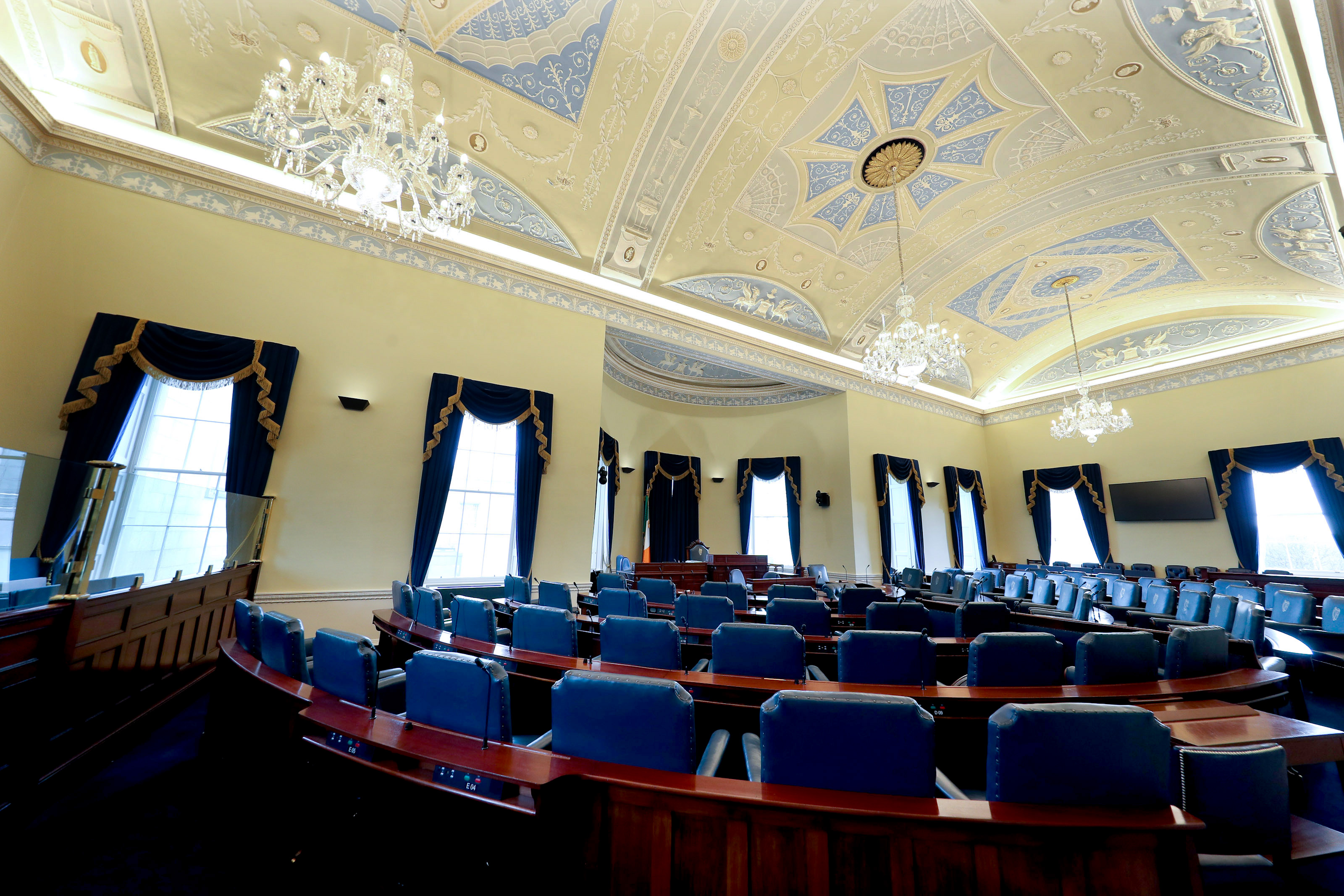
Fianna Fáil and Fine Gael advocated the abolition of Seanad Éireann (chamber pictured in 2020), the upper house of the Oireachtas.

Political reform played an unusually large role in this election. The academic Kevin Rafter compared the proposals to the "liberal agenda" under Garret FitzGerald in the 1980s, remarking that although the ideas were worthy, they served as a distraction from the economic malaise. They were also a way for Fianna Fáil's new leader, Micheál Martin, to distinguish himself from Brian Cowen. Fine Gael and Fianna Fáil supported the abolition of Seanad Éireann, the upper house of the Oireachtas, and the conversion of the Dáil into a unicameral parliament. Fianna Fáil proposed changing the electoral system for the Dáil to mixed-member proportional representation, while Fine Gael advocated reducing the size of the chamber by twenty members. Fine Gael and Labour wanted a register of lobbyists, seen as necessary due to close ties between Fianna Fáil and the banking and property sectors. Fine Gael had proposed statutory gender quotas for Dáil elections in its New Politics document in 2010, but due to internal opposition the policy was not in its manifesto. Labour and Sinn Féin supported gender quotas.

Elsewhere, Fine Gael proposed the abolition of the Health Service Executive and the introduction of the "Dutch model" of universal health insurance. Labour advocated splitting the HSE's functions to create an independent operator of care for vulnerable children but did not support wholesale abolition or an insurance-based healthcare model. Labour opposed the re-introduction of third-level fees, which they had abolished as part of the Rainbow Coalition in the 1990s, but Fine Gael supported a graduate tax. Fine Gael proposed making Irish optional at the Leaving Certificate exams, which was opposed by Conradh na Gaeilge and the ASTI. Labour advocated legislating for the X Case, permitting legal abortion in cases where there was a risk of suicide, but Fine Gael promised only to set up an all-party committee on the issue. No other major party manifesto mentioned abortion. Labour wanted a referendum on same-sex marriage but Fine Gael was non-committal.

== Campaign ==
=== Party strategies ===
At the beginning of the campaign, bookmakers regarded a Fine Gael–Labour coalition as near-certain. Despite years of media criticism of Enda Kenny's performance and a failed leadership challenge barely six months earlier, he was now overwhelming favourite to be Taoiseach. Fine Gael had more to spend on campaigning than any other party: €2.25 million, versus €1 million for Fianna Fáil and €800,000 for the Labour Party. The party's platform was built around a "Five-Point Plan" intended to reassure voters it was prepared for government. Party figures spread the message relentlessly, to the point of parody; Leo Varadkar, a frontbencher, said after the election that only once politicians had become sick of saying it could they be sure the public had heard it.

Labour's campaign focused on the prospect of Eamon Gilmore as the first politician from that party to lead an Irish government. Posters saying "Gilmore for Taoiseach" went up around the country. According to the party's national organiser, David Leach, every internal poll and focus group showed Gilmore beating Kenny hands down. The party's finance spokesperson, Joan Burton, was seen as an impressive media performer. Labour had declined from its polling highs of mid-2010, though, and by the time the campaign began, the party was in danger of being squeezed between Fine Gael and a resurgent Sinn Féin, which had begun making inroads among protest voters on the left.

In 2007, after re-entering the Northern Ireland Executive under the St Andrews Agreement, Sinn Féin had moved to the centre in the Republic's general election, abandoning its opposition to the 12.5% corporation tax rate with a view to governing with Fianna Fáil. This would have seen the party in power on both sides of the border; Sinn Féin's intent was advance a united Ireland, but the party fared poorly at the election. In 2011, with little chance of being in government, the party embraced a left-wing populist agenda, presenting itself as outside the state's political consensus and opposing the EU–IMF agreement under the slogan There is a Better Way.

At Fianna Fáil, the mood was phlegmatic. Seán Dorgan, the party's general secretary, said that the public's attitude had shifted after the Troika arrived; voters had gone from being angry at Fianna Fáil to ignoring them completely. The party's campaign focused on the future and the personality of Micheál Martin, under the slogan Real Plan, Better Future. The new leader appointed his own frontbench separate from the outgoing cabinet, including some figures who had not previously served in national politics. In contrast to previous elections at which Fianna Fáil had been accused of "auction politics", in 2011 the party made a virtue of its inability to promise new spending.

For the Green Party, the situation was bleak. The party had limited resources, and there was speculation that all six of its TDs might lose their seats. The Greens sought to distance themselves from the government's unpopular record, running an issued-based campaign focused on the need for strong climate policies and expressing openness to coalition with Fine Gael.

=== "Frankfurt's Way or Labour's Way" ===
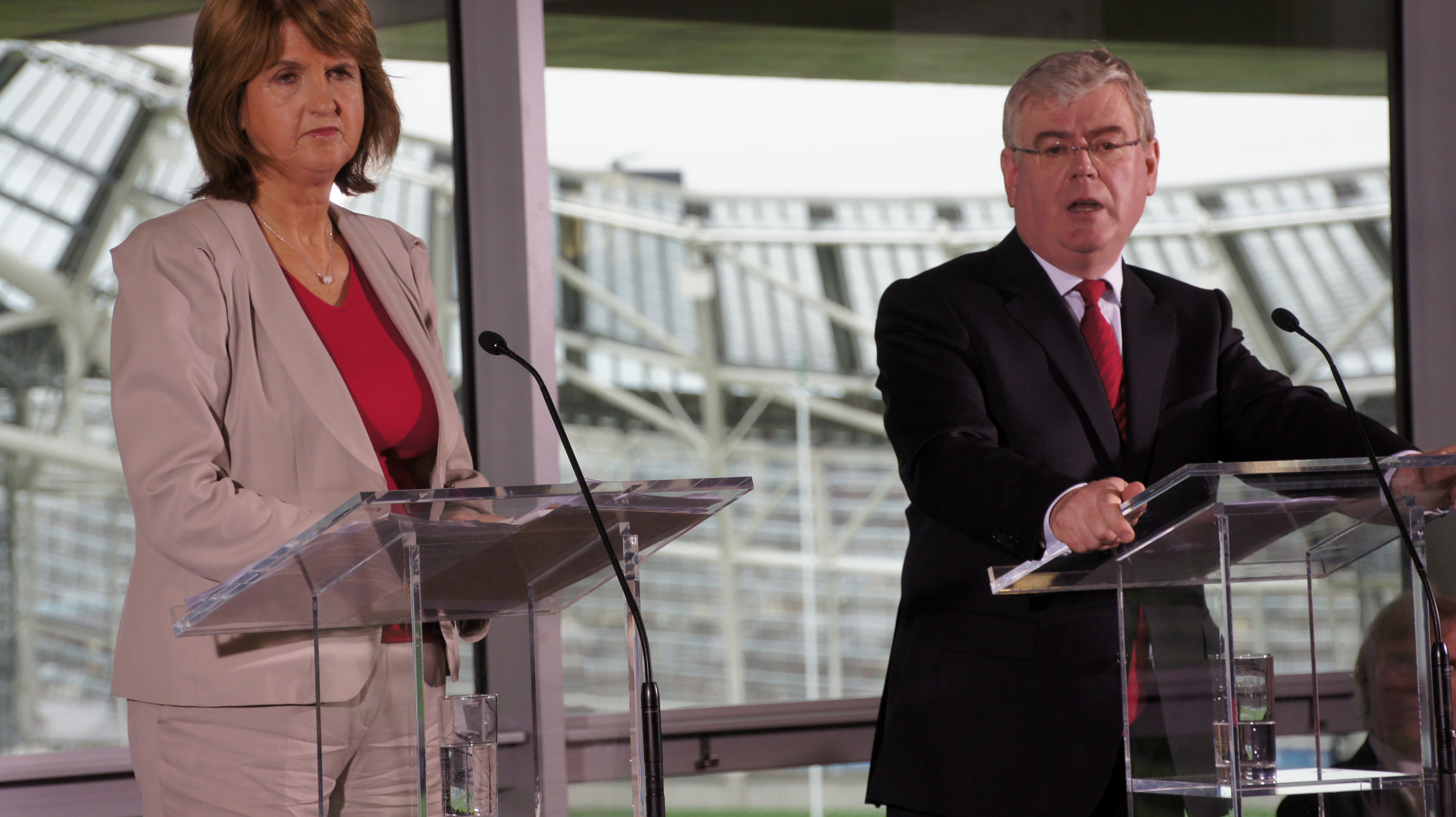
Joan Burton and Eamon Gilmore launched Labour's manifesto on 11 February at the Aviva Stadium.

Labour changed its campaign strategy in 2011: having run slick but inflexible efforts in 2002 and 2007, this time the party held back funding for the final days so it could respond to the tactics of others. It ran under the slogan One Ireland: Jobs, Reform, Fairness.

On 3 February, Eamon Gilmore gave a speech describing the Troika agreement as a "bad deal". He suggested that Jean-Claude Trichet, the President of the European Central Bank (ECB), could be persuaded to change the terms of the bailout if there was sufficient political pressure. He said the election was going to determine if policy would be set by the central bank or the elected Irish government, remarking "It's Frankfurt's way or Labour's way". When asked what he would do if the ECB rejected a renegotiation, he said: "We are confident that we can renegotiate it. I will tell you why. The current deal cannot be worked." "Labour's Way" was seen as a misstep by Gilmore, which reinforced perceptions that he could channel public anger but was light on detail. Ruairi Quinn, a Labour frontbencher and former finance minister, sought to clarify the remark, saying the party would not unilaterally exit the deal and that Gilmore's rhetoric was "part and parcel of an election campaign".

=== Fine Gael gains ground ===
Fine Gael's revival after Richard Bruton's leadership challenge in June 2010 had been attributed in part to its new finance spokesperson, Michael Noonan. A veteran of Fine Gael-led governments in the 1980s and 1990s, Noonan had served as party leader for sixteen months in the early 2000s before resigning after a disastrous general election in 2002. As a backbencher, he had been regarded as prescient in identifying that Irish banks had a problem with solvency rather than liquidity. Noonan was seen as an elder statesman, and, more so than Enda Kenny, was reassuring and authoritative to voters. With Fianna Fáil certain to be put out of government, Fine Gael strategists regarded the party's main opponent as Labour, expecting the election to determine the balance of power between the two in a coalition. Central to Fine Gael's pitch to voters considering Labour was a commitment not to increase income tax rates. On 8 February, Noonan said Labour was "becoming a seriously high-tax party", a charge rejected by Eamon Gilmore.

At the 2007 election, Enda Kenny was widely seen to have lost his sole TV debate against Bertie Ahern. Kenny's perceived weakness as a media performer came to the fore when he refused to participate in a three-way TV3 leaders' debate on 8 February chaired by Vincent Browne, a critic of his leadership. The debate went ahead without him; Fianna Fáil and Labour said he was running scared, but Fine Gael strategists believed the incident had no impact. Six days later, Kenny met German chancellor Angela Merkel and European Commission president José Manuel Barroso in Berlin. The event was intended by the Fine Gael campaign to make Kenny appear a statesman; they compared it to Bertie Ahern meeting Ian Paisley at the site of the Battle of the Boyne before the 2007 election. That evening, a five-way leaders' debate on The Frontline went well for Kenny amid low expectations, and by the end of the second week of campaigning, Fine Gael's poll lead was increasing.

=== Overall majority speculation and "Every Little Hurts" ===
Entering the second half of the campaign, Fianna Fáil had made little impact despite a competent effort at national level. Locally, the party was riven with infighting, notably in Dublin Central and Limerick City. Sinn Féin's policies were described as "fairytale economics" by Eamon Gilmore but appealed to the working-class and disaffected young voters the party was trying to win, while Gerry Adams's debate performance was seen as an improvement on a lacklustre showing in 2007.

The final two weeks were dominated by the possibility Fine Gael would win an overall majority, something no party had done since 1977. With strong transfers likely to produce a large seat bonus, it was thought Fine Gael could win a majority with close to 40 per cent of the vote. Given the perceived hostility of Irish voters to single-party government, Fine Gael played down its chances of winning outright.

On 15 February, a private poll commissioned by Labour showed the party at 16 per cent, in third place behind Fine Gael on 40 per cent and Fianna Fáil on 18 per cent. Its campaign was plunged into crisis. Having led in the polls less than a year earlier, Labour faced the prospect of failing to enter government altogether. Kenny now polled as the more popular leader. Labour abandoned all talk of "Gilmore for Taoiseach", believing it needed to use its spare resources to mount a negative campaign against Fine Gael in the final week. As part of a wider push, Labour published a series of newspaper ads under the slogan "Fine Gael: Every Little Hurts", a play on Tesco's motto "Every little helps". The adverts were designed to resemble a supermarket promotion, with images of a baby, a car, a piggy bank and other goods next to a price tag indicating cuts and tax increases proposed by Fine Gael. Gilmore approved the campaign, believing it would get public attention and influence the election. Tesco made phone calls to Labour protesting the slogan.

Fine Gael faltered in the final week; Kenny's performance in the final TV debate on Prime Time was regarded by pundits as disappointing. A revitalised Eamon Gilmore went on the attack against Micheál Martin, having held back in the Frontline debate. Former Taoiseach Garret FitzGerald endorsed a Fine Gael–Labour coalition, warning his party against trying to govern alone. Final polls suggested that Fine Gael would fall short of a majority.

By the campaign's end, Fianna Fáil was polling in the mid-teens. At dissolution, the party had been expected to lose more than half its seats; by election day, it was anticipated it could emerge with as few as twenty, and Tánaiste Mary Coughlan was believed to be in trouble. Though Micheál Martin predicted the party would retain a presence in every constituency, media outlets said it faced wipeout in much of the country, including Kerry and most of Dublin and Cork.

=== Television debates ===
TV debates had been a feature of Irish elections since 1982. In 2011, there were four across three channels, an unprecedented number. Labour's polling success meant they were invited to all of them alongside Fianna Fáil and Fine Gael. The debate on RTÉ's The Frontline on 14 February was the first in Ireland to feature questions from a panel of undecided voters in the studio. The first-ever Irish language election debate was broadcast by TG4 on 16 February, chaired by Eimear Ní Chonaola. It provoked a mixed reaction, though Ní Chonaola's performance and the fluency of the leaders were praised. The final debate, on RTÉ's Prime Time on 22 February, was broadcast live on C-SPAN in the United States, while a recording was shown on BBC Parliament in the United Kingdom.

2011 Irish general election debates
N°.	Date	Broadcaster	Moderator	Language	Audience	Participants				
P Participant. N Non-invitee. A Absent invitee.						Adams	Gilmore	Gormley	Kenny	Martin
1	8 February	TV3	Vincent Browne	English	354,000	N	P	N	A	P
2	14 February	RTÉ	Pat Kenny	English	961,000	P	P	P	P	P
3	16 February	TG4	Eimear Ní Chonaola	Irish	408,000	N	P	N	P	P
4	22 February	RTÉ	Miriam O'Callaghan	English	800,000	N	P	N	P	P

=== Online campaign ===
In 2007, only a third of general election candidates had a campaign website. By 2011, 74 per cent had a Facebook page and slightly more than half were active on Twitter, leading the vote to be called the "social media election". The major parties spent extensively on online advertising; a budget of about €35,000 was needed to be competitive. Fianna Fáil candidates were less likely than those of Fine Gael or Labour to have a social media presence. Some independent candidates like Dylan Haskins came into the campaign with large online followings but were unable to convert them into electoral success. The website Politweets.ie found that of the 100 most active candidates on Twitter, 61 failed to get elected, and Kevin Rafter said the election was ultimately decided by the televised debates, not social media. Bloggers Suzy Byrne and Mick Fealty appeared as analysts on RTÉ's election coverage, and on the first day of counting, the hashtag #ge11 was tweeted 22,000 times.

== Opinion polls ==
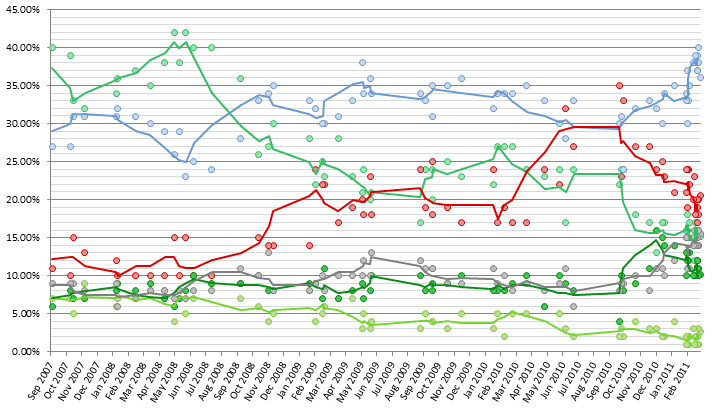
4-point average trend line of poll results from September 2007 to election day Fianna Fáil Fine Gael Labour Party Green Party Sinn Féin Others

During the campaign, polls were conducted by Ipsos MRBI, Red C, and Millward Brown Lansdowne. Overall, the surveys were regarded as broadly accurate, though the final samples slightly overestimated Fine Gael and underestimated Fianna Fáil. This was attributed to a swing from Fine Gael to Labour and independents in the final days, as well as a "shy Fianna Fáil voter" who appeared disproportionately among those replying "don't know" to pollsters. In pre-election polls, voters viewed unemployment and the public finances as the two most important issues, with the health service a distant third.

An exit poll conducted by Millward Brown Lansdowne for RTÉ was published at 08:00 on 26 February, the day after the election. According to the sample, Fine Gael was the largest party across every social class, winning the most votes with every age and gender category. Labour gained with every social class except farmers. National policy was the predominant factor influencing voting behaviour, compared with candidate quality and local concerns in 2007. 65 per cent said the new government should focus on reducing spending, versus 7 per cent for raising taxes and 18 per cent for both. 43 per cent wanted a Fine Gael–Labour coalition government compared to 18 per cent for Fine Gael alone. Poll respondents regarded Micheál Martin as having performed best in the TV debates, but only 35 per cent of those favouring him said they voted for Fianna Fáil.

== Results ==
Counting began at 09:00 on 26 February, and the result was known in broad terms the following day. The tabulation of votes concluded with the election of Seán Kyne to the final seat in Galway West on the morning of 2 March.

The election result was a catastrophe for Fianna Fáil. The party emerged with its lowest-ever vote, 17 per cent, and its smallest presence in the Dáil, 20 TDs. Its decline of 58 seats was the largest ever in a Dáil election. Of the six sitting cabinet ministers who stood for re-election, three – Pat Carey, Mary Coughlan and Mary Hanafin – lost their seats. Coughlan's defeat was described as Ireland's "Portillo moment" by The Guardian. Another four former ministers were defeated, including former deputy leader Mary O'Rourke and the former Ceann Comhairle John O'Donoghue.

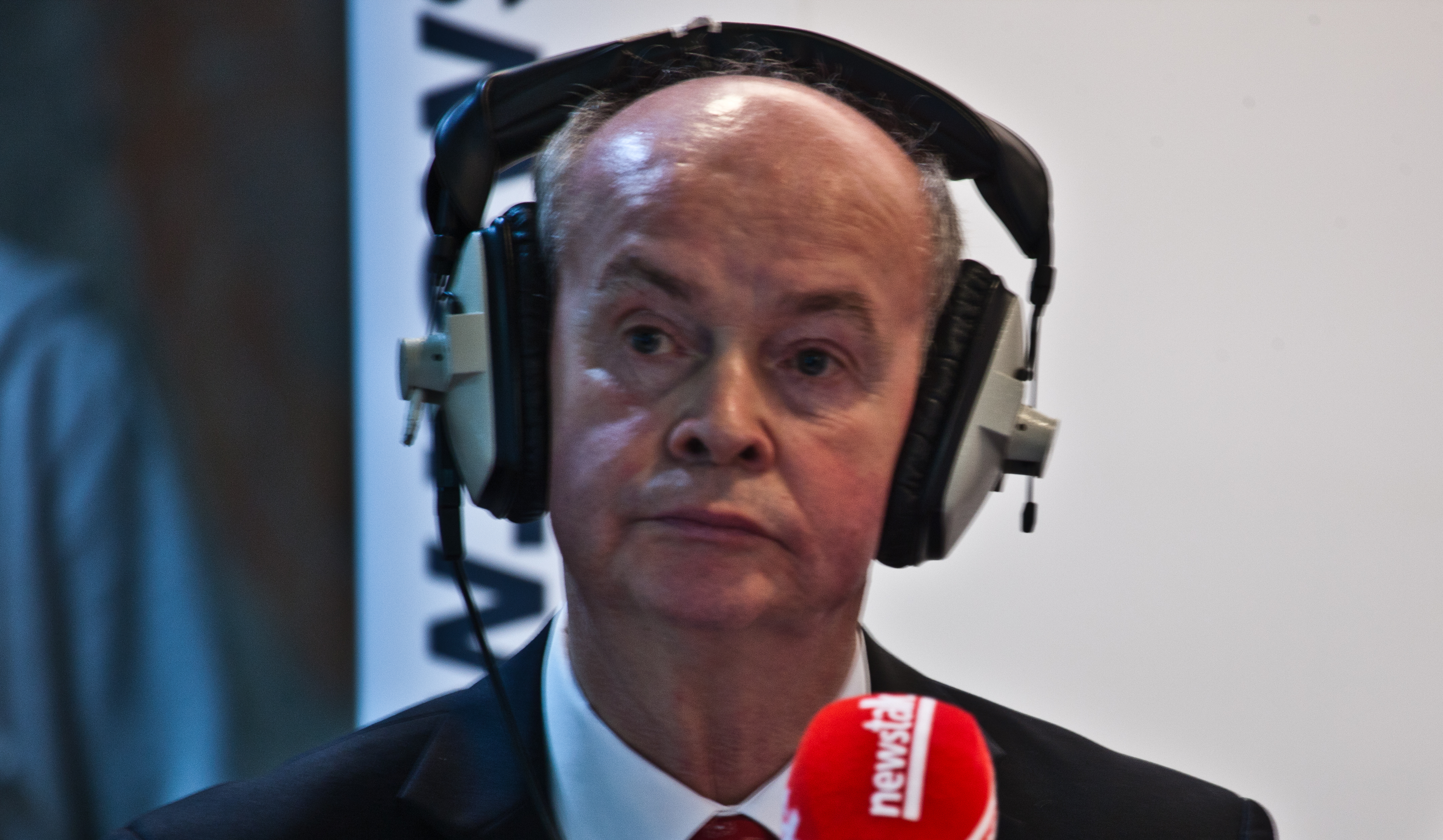
Pat Carey speaks to Newstalk at the RDS count centre. Of six outgoing Fianna Fáil ministers who contested the election, three lost their seats, including Carey.

What was left of Fianna Fáil's parliamentary ranks contained few obvious prospects for the future. It returned no female TDs; its only representative in Dublin was the outgoing Minister for Finance, Brian Lenihan, who died from cancer three months after the election. The party's vote collapsed almost everywhere and among every social group. Fianna Fáil's internal transfer rate was historically low, contradicting the popular narrative that its remaining support base consisted of party loyalists.

Fine Gael became the largest party in the Dáil for the first time in its history, electing 76 TDs with 36 per cent of the vote. It was eight seats short of a majority. The party won four seats in Enda Kenny's constituency of Mayo, something no party had done before in a five-seater. Kenny won the largest first-preference vote in the country. Having lacked a TD in thirteen constituencies when Kenny became leader in 2002, the party now had a presence everywhere except Dublin North-West. Its vote in Dublin had more than doubled since 2002. Although 76 seats was a record for the party, its vote share fell short of the 39 per cent won in November 1982. Three Fine Gael TDs lost their seats to rivals from their own party.

Labour won its highest-ever vote and seat total, with 37 TDs and a 19 per cent share. The party took the most seats in Dublin despite winning slightly fewer votes than Fine Gael. Labour made historic gains in Clare, Cork South-West, and most notably Galway East, Eamon Gilmore's area of origin, where the party won a seat for the first time ever. It was the first time Labour had elected multiple TDs in Connacht since 1927. Poor vote management cost the party second seats in Cork East and Dún Laoghaire. While impressive, Labour's performance was regarded as underwhelming compared to expectations before the campaign, and left the party in a weaker position relative to Fine Gael than it had been the last time it formed a government with them in 1994.

Sinn Féin elected 14 TDs with 10 per cent of the vote, its best result in its modern incarnation. Gerry Adams topped the poll in Louth, attaining the third-highest first-preference vote in the state; the party won seats in every constituency in the Border Region. In Dublin, the party gained TDs despite a relatively small increase in its vote. With the elections of Pearse Doherty, Mary Lou McDonald and Peadar Tóibín, the parliamentary party was regarded as having a younger and more gender-balanced feel than previously. Sinn Féin now had enough TDs to gain full speaking rights under the Dáil's standing orders. After the election, Adams took over from Caoimhghín Ó Caoláin as leader of the parliamentary party.

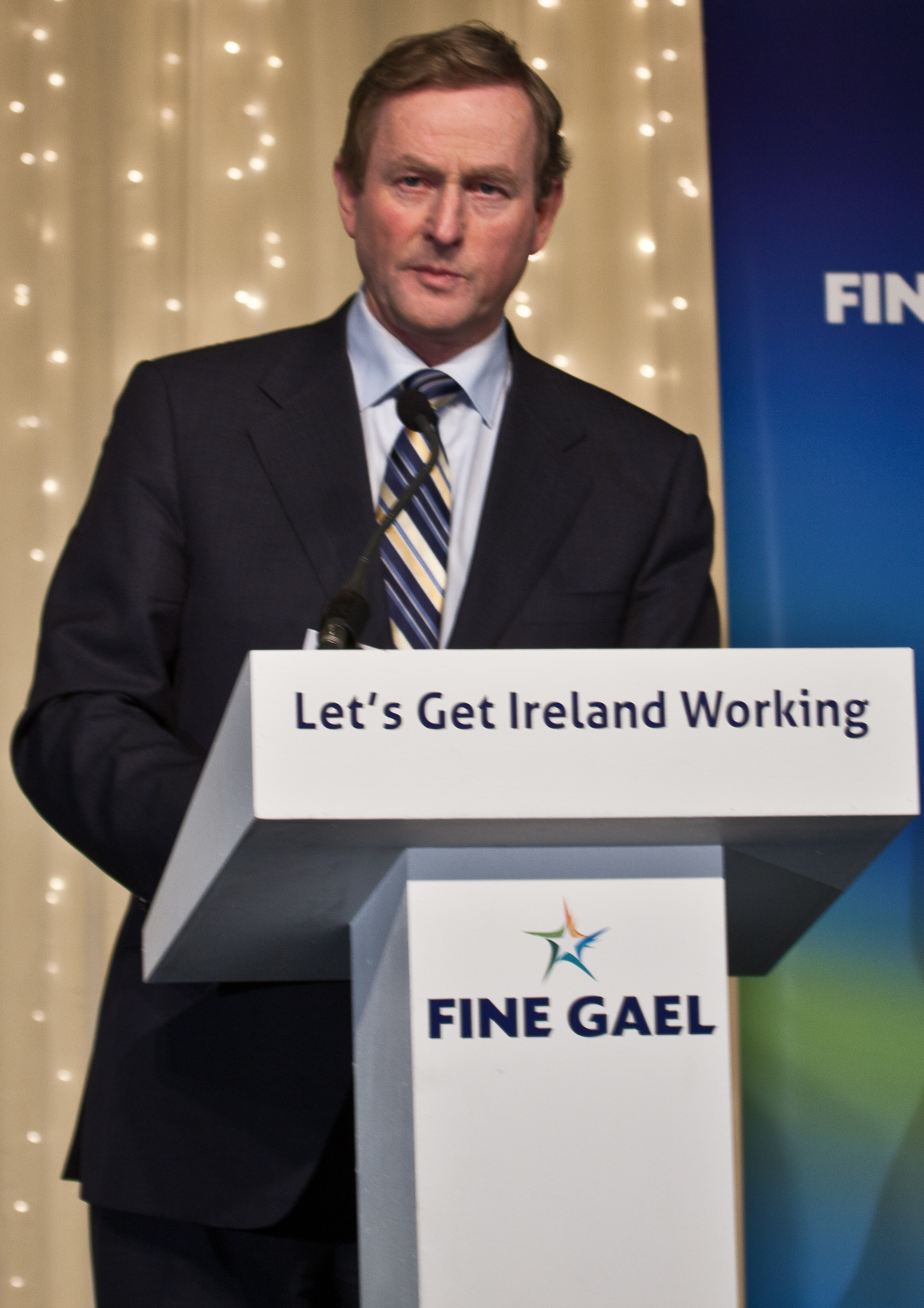
Enda Kenny speaks at a Fine Gael post-election event in Dublin

Elsewhere, the Green Party lost all its TDs, despite speculation that Trevor Sargent and Eamon Ryan might survive. All but four of its candidates failed to win a reimbursement of expenses; the party fell just short of the 2 per cent national vote needed to secure public funding, which had drastic implications for its continued ability to employ full-time staff. The United Left Alliance won five seats, including returning TDs Joe Higgins and Séamus Healy. Fourteen independents were elected, an increase of nine on 2007, including three who topped the poll in their constituencies: Michael Lowry, Shane Ross and Mick Wallace.

Turnout increased slightly on 2007. All opposition parties transferred strongly against Fianna Fáil, but preferencing between Fine Gael and Labour was well below its historic peak in the 1970s. Labour were the most transfer-friendly party. Of the TDs elected to the 31st Dáil, fewer than half had been members of the 30th, and there was a record number of first-time deputies, among them the future Taoiseach Simon Harris. The average age of the new Dáil was 49, similar to recent cohorts. A record 25 women were elected, though at 15 per cent of the total this still left Ireland well below the EU average. Labour's Dominic Hannigan and John Lyons became the first openly gay TDs.

After the new Dáil began its term, an indirect election was held for the 24th Seanad. Only two defeated Fianna Fáil TDs won election to the upper house, Thomas Byrne and Darragh O'Brien. Two former junior ministers, Seán Connick and Martin Mansergh, stood in the election and lost. All three defeated Fine Gael TDs won Seanad seats.

=== Detailed results ===
Election to the 31st Dáil (PR–STV) – Turnout 69.9%
Party	Leader	First pref votes	% FPv	Swing%	TDs	Change (since 2007)	% of seats
Fine Gael	Enda Kenny	801,628	36.1	▲8.8	76	▲25	45.8
Labour	Eamon Gilmore	431,796	19.5	▲9.3	37	▲17	22.3
Fianna Fáil	Micheál Martin	387,358	17.5	▼24.2	20	▼58	12.0
Sinn Féin	Gerry Adams	220,661	9.9	▲3.0	14	▲10	8.4
Socialist Party	Collective leadership	26,770	1.2	▲0.6	2	▲2	1.2
People Before Profit	Collective leadership	21,551	1.0	▲0.6	2	▲2	1.2
Workers and Unemployed	Séamus Healy	8,818	0.4	▲0.1	1	▲1	0.6
Green	John Gormley	41,039	1.8	▼2.9	0	▼6	0
SKIA	Michael Gleeson	4,939	0.2	▲0.2	0	Steady	0
Workers' Party	Mick Finnegan	3,056	0.1	0	0	Steady	0
Christian Solidarity	Richard Greene	2,102	0.1	0	0	Steady	0
Fís Nua	None	938	0	New	0	New	0
Independent	—	269,703	12.1	▲6.9	14	▲9	8.4
Total		2,220,359	100	—N/a	166	—N/a	100

=== List of TDs who lost their seats ===
Forty-five sitting TDs (27% of the total) lost their Dáil seats at the election: Fianna Fáil (35), Green Party (6), Fine Gael (3) and Independent (1). These were:

Party	Name	Constituency	Notes
Fianna Fáil	Michael Ahern	Cork East	Minister of State
Fianna Fáil	Barry Andrews	Dún Laoghaire	Minister of State
Fianna Fáil	Chris Andrews	Dublin South-East	
Fianna Fáil	Bobby Aylward	Carlow–Kilkenny	
Fianna Fáil	Áine Brady	Kildare North	Minister of State
Fianna Fáil	Cyprian Brady	Dublin Central	
Fianna Fáil	Johnny Brady	Meath West	
Fianna Fáil	Thomas Byrne	Meath East	
Fianna Fáil	Pat Carey	Dublin North-West	Minister for Community, Equality and Gaeltacht Affairs
Fianna Fáil	Margaret Conlon	Cavan–Monaghan	
Fianna Fáil	Seán Connick	Wexford	Minister of State
Fianna Fáil	Mary Coughlan	Donegal South-West	Tánaiste and Minister for Education and Skills
Fianna Fáil	John Curran	Dublin Mid-West	Government Chief Whip
Fianna Fáil	Frank Fahey	Galway West	Former cabinet minister
Fianna Fáil	Michael Fitzpatrick	Kildare North	
Fianna Fáil	Mary Hanafin	Dún Laoghaire	Minister for Tourism, Culture and Sport
Fianna Fáil	Seán Haughey	Dublin North-Central	Minister of State
Fianna Fáil	Máire Hoctor	Tipperary North	Minister of State
Fianna Fáil	Peter Kelly	Longford–Westmeath	
Fianna Fáil	Brendan Kenneally	Waterford	
Fianna Fáil	Michael Kennedy	Dublin North	
Fianna Fáil	Conor Lenihan	Dublin South-West	Minister of State
Fianna Fáil	Martin Mansergh	Tipperary South	Minister of State
Fianna Fáil	Tom McEllistrim	Kerry North–West Limerick	
Fianna Fáil	John Moloney	Laois–Offaly	Minister of State
Fianna Fáil	Michael Mulcahy	Dublin South-Central	
Fianna Fáil	Darragh O'Brien	Dublin North	
Fianna Fáil	Charlie O'Connor	Dublin South-West	
Fianna Fáil	John O'Donoghue	Kerry South	Former cabinet minister and Ceann Comhairle
Fianna Fáil	Mary O'Rourke	Longford–Westmeath	Former cabinet minister and Fianna Fáil deputy leader
Fianna Fáil	Christy O'Sullivan	Cork South-West	
Fianna Fáil	Peter Power	Limerick City	Minister of State
Fianna Fáil	Seán Power	Kildare South	Minister of State
Fianna Fáil	Dick Roche	Wicklow	Minister of State and former cabinet minister
Fianna Fáil	Eamon Scanlon	Sligo–North Leitrim	
Green Party	Ciarán Cuffe	Dún Laoghaire	Minister of State
Green Party	Paul Gogarty	Dublin Mid-West	
Green Party	John Gormley	Dublin South-East	Minister for the Environment, Heritage and Local Government
Green Party	Eamon Ryan	Dublin South	Minister for Communications, Energy and Natural Resources
Green Party	Trevor Sargent	Dublin North	Minister of State
Green Party	Mary White	Carlow–Kilkenny	Minister of State
Fine Gael	Deirdre Clune	Cork South-Central	
Fine Gael	Michael W. D'Arcy	Wexford	
Fine Gael	Tom Sheahan	Kerry South	
Independent	Joe Behan	Wicklow	Elected as a Fianna Fáil TD in 2007

=== Government formation ===
Enda Kenny described the election result as a "democratic revolution" and moved quickly to form a government. While counts were still ongoing, Kenny and Eamon Gilmore met for eighty minutes on 28 February to discuss policies and portfolios. Labour wanted a 9–6 split of cabinet posts, but Fine Gael insisted on a 10–5 division to reflect the election results. They also disagreed on which party would get the finance portfolio.

Brian Cowen allowed the two parties use of Government Buildings and access to the civil service. The negotiating teams were briefed by Central Bank of Ireland governor Patrick Honohan and economist Colm McCarthy, as well as officials from the Department of Finance and the National Treasury Management Agency. In spite of personality clashes between the two leaders, this information reportedly created a tone of constructive engagement, as the two parties became fully aware of the scale of the fiscal crisis. Labour insisted on maintaining child benefit rates and not introducing third-level fees. The two parties agreed to bring forward a Jobs Budget to stimulate the economy. A programme for what was described as a Government of National Recovery was agreed late on 5 March.

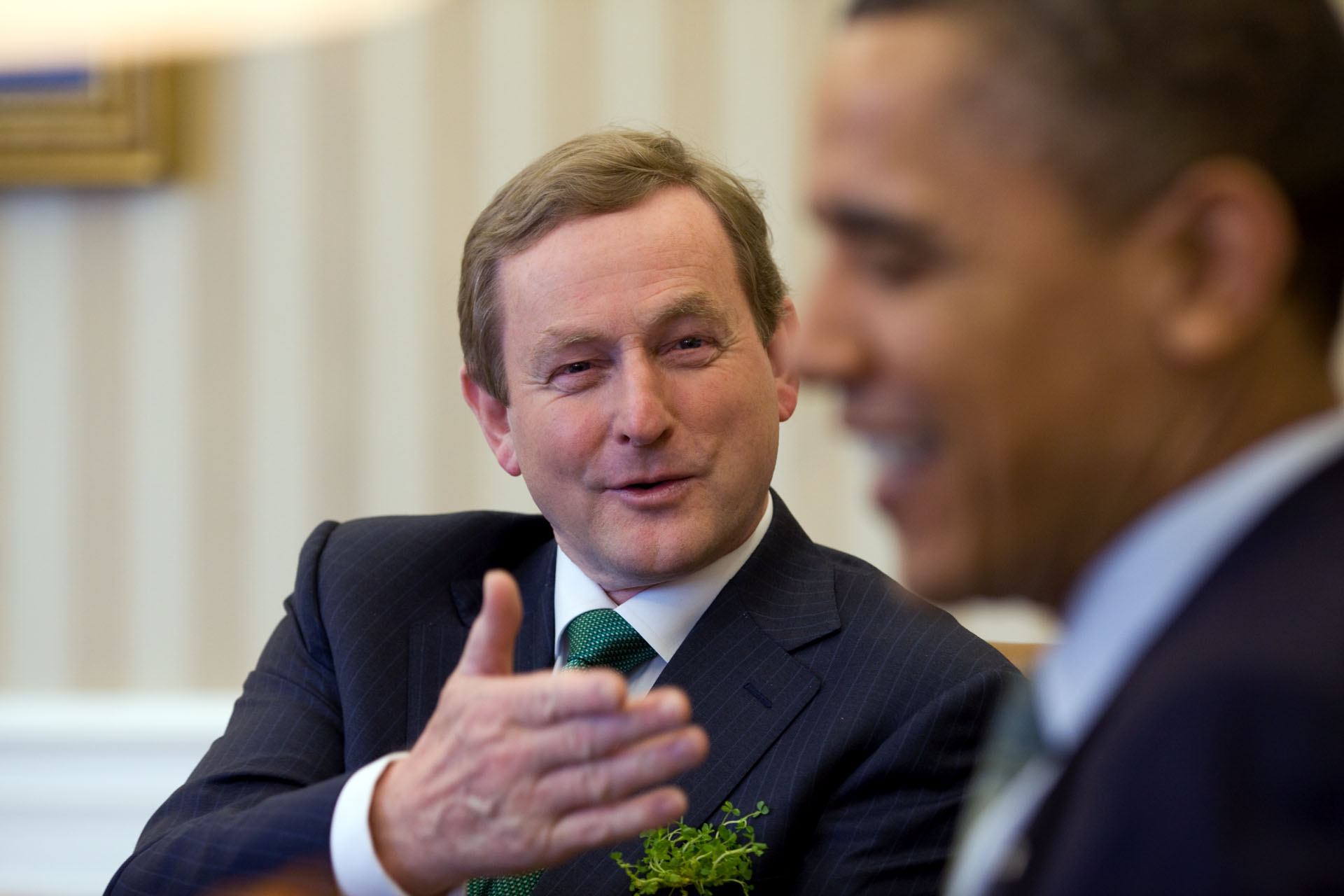
A week after becoming Taoiseach, Enda Kenny met United States president Barack Obama at the White House for Saint Patrick's Day.

The following day, the agreement was ratified by the Fine Gael parliamentary party and a special conference of Labour delegates. Fine Gael TDs unanimously approved the programme, but two Labour TDs, Tommy Broughan and Joanna Tuffy, opposed it. The cabinet was to be divided 10–5 in favour of Fine Gael, but Labour got a super junior minister and their choice of attorney general. The Department of Finance was split, a measure planned before the election, and Labour secured the new role of Minister for Public Expenditure and Reform. It was the seventh time in Irish history that Fine Gael and Labour had formed a government together.

On 9 March, seventy-nine years to the day after Cumann na nGaedheal had made way for the first Fianna Fáil government, Enda Kenny was elected Taoiseach by the 31st Dáil by a record margin of 117 to 27. There was considerable goodwill towards the new government. As well as Fine Gael and Labour, several independent TDs voted for Kenny, and Fianna Fáil abstained. His cabinet was revealed later that day, with Gilmore as Tánaiste and Minister for Foreign Affairs and Trade, and Michael Noonan as Minister for Finance. Only two women were appointed to the new cabinet, one fewer than had been selected by Brian Cowen in 2008; there was surprise at the decision to make Joan Burton Minister for Social Protection instead of giving her a senior economic portfolio. This decision was criticised by journalists Olivia O'Leary and Justine McCarthy, who regarded it as sexist; it was reportedly a consequence of growing mistrust between Burton and Gilmore.

=== Analysis ===
In the immediate aftermath, Diarmaid Ferriter and David McCullagh compared the election to the 1918 election which had swept the Irish Parliamentary Party from office and led to Sinn Féin establishing the First Dáil. Ferriter argued that Fianna Fáil would struggle to make itself relevant on the opposition benches. Peter Mair remarked on parallels between Fianna Fáil's collapse and those of Christian Democracy in Italy and the Progressive Conservatives in Canada, as well as the slower decline of Northern Ireland's founding party, the Ulster Unionists.

Ferriter described the election as a personal triumph for Enda Kenny. The new Taoiseach had proven his doubters wrong and seen off a challenge from what the author termed "posh boys" in his own party. Though frequently underestimated, Kenny had demonstrated a "ruthless canniness" borne of three and a half decades in public life. The journalist Pat Leahy wrote that Kenny's combination of good humour and seriousness of purpose became popular with voters during the campaign. Ferriter also remarked that in common with European sister parties, the Greens had suffered from a fickleness in their support base. Deaglán de Bréadún compared the Greens to "early Christians", saying their beliefs would endure despite an electoral trouncing. Internationally, Bloomberg considered the election result a bad omen for other euro zone leaders, including French president Nicolas Sarkozy who was up for re-election in 2012.

At the time, the election was the third most volatile in democratic Europe since 1945, after Italy in 1994 and the Netherlands in 2002. Although there had been a modest shift to the left, analysts wondered if 2011 qualified as a realigning election, given the survival of Ireland's traditional party system and the replacement of one government led by the centre-right with another. Writing a decade later, Ferriter described the vote as "revenge rather than revolution". The replacement of Fianna Fáil with a Fine Gael–Labour coalition represented historic continuity; Mair wrote that the volatility of the electorate in the absence of a major new party was virtually without precedent internationally. He said Ireland was now a "one-and-two-halves party system", and believed Fianna Fáil would spend a long period in opposition but was likely to return to power in the medium term. A study by Stephen Quinlan and Martin Okolikj found that voter loyalty to Fianna Fáil had been declining in the 2000s, and the party had become increasingly reliant on the economy to buttress its support, especially among educated voters. Ferriter said it was ironic that the party's survival had been assured by the PR–STV electoral system it had twice tried to abolish in the twentieth century.

According to the political scientist Gary Murphy, Irish policy-making had been hollowed out by Social Partnership and an over-cosy relationship between government and business, leading to the bank guarantee's emergence from "a let's-hope-for-the-best mentality". A 2013 study said that although media outlets were under severe commercial pressure due to the economic crisis, there was less horse race journalism in 2011 than at previous elections and a greater focus on policy. Two studies into the election outcome identified the growth of class-based voting behaviour, especially for Fine Gael among wealthier segments and Sinn Féin with poorer voters, and the emergence of a conscious left-right ideological split among the public.

Peter Mair commented that although seismic, the election had not delivered real change, as the EU–IMF deal remained in place almost in its entirety and limited the new government's room for manoeuvre. He compared the situation to the emerging democracies of the Balkans in the 1990s, where external creditors had played a dominant role in policy, engendering popular anger and undermining the legitimacy of the democratic process. Political scientists Niamh Hardiman and Aidan Regan wrote that while Ireland had experienced remarkably little social conflict during the economic crisis, the collapse of Fianna Fáil had opened up space for more radical ideas at a time when faith in political institutions was at an all-time low.

== Aftermath ==
"Frankfurt's Way or Labour's Way" came back to haunt Eamon Gilmore after the election, as the deal with the Troika was not renegotiated. "Every Little Hurts" also became a source of embarrassment, associated in the public mind with broken promises. Gilmore later expressed regret at not checking the specific claims in the ad more closely. Aodhán Ó Ríordáin, who did not use the ad in his constituency, said in 2015 that it had been "silly" of Labour to make such detailed attacks.

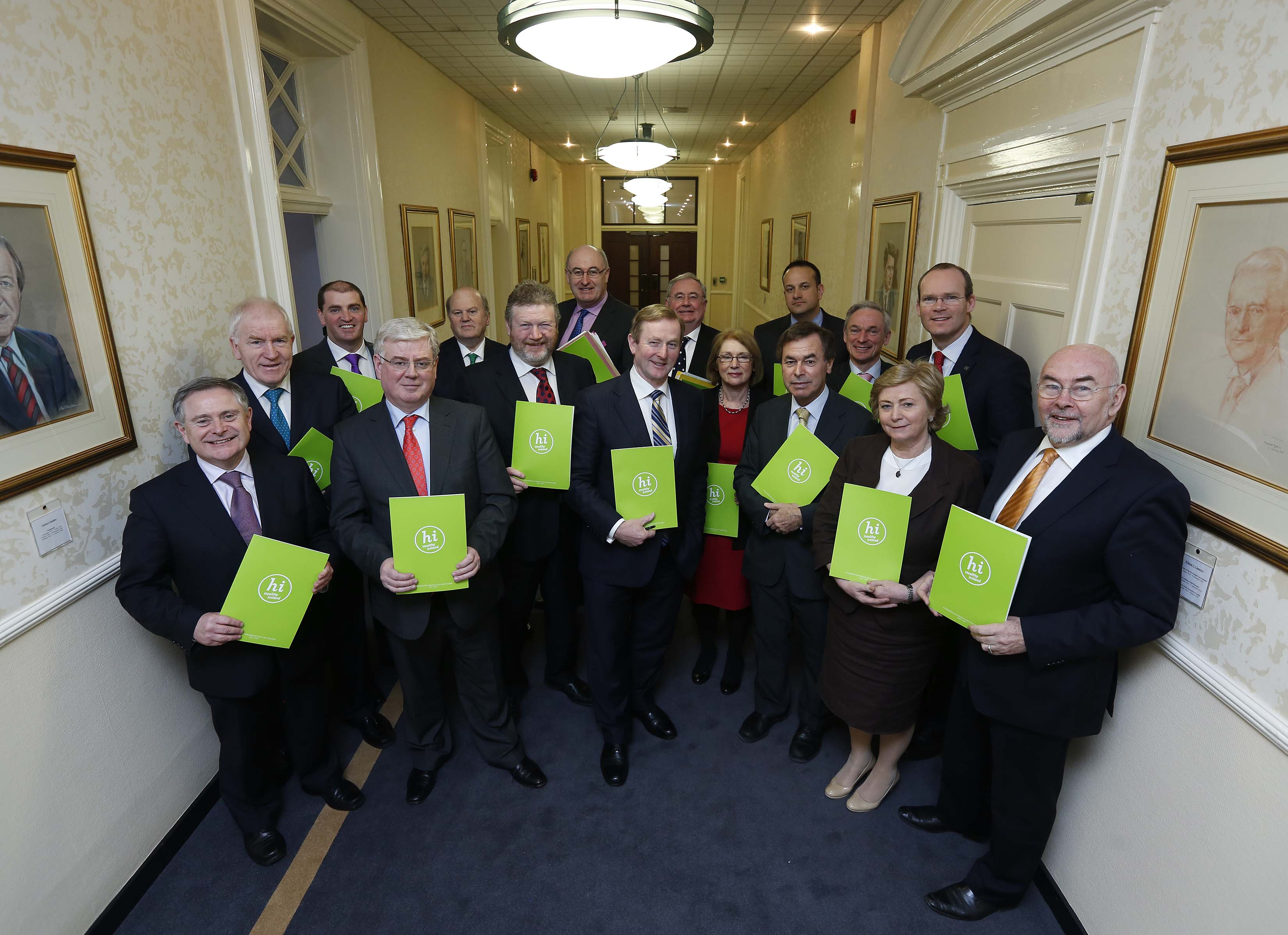
Members of the Fine Gael–Labour cabinet in 2013

Ireland exited the Troika bailout programme in late 2013. Although strong economic growth resumed in the mid-2010s, the Fine Gael–Labour coalition became unpopular due to austerity and its highly contentious attempt to roll out domestic water charges. In 2014, the two parties made substantial losses in local and European elections, and Fianna Fáil, still led by Micheál Martin, became the largest force in local government again. Eamon Gilmore resigned as Labour leader in July 2014 and was replaced by Joan Burton, the first woman to head the party. She immediately sacked Gilmore from the cabinet.

In 2016, Fine Gael lost 26 seats at the general election while Labour shed more than three-quarters of its TDs. Fianna Fáil more than doubled its representation and Sinn Féin also made gains. The Social Democrats – a new party co-founded by former Labour junior minister Róisín Shortall, who had resigned from the party in 2012 over health cuts – returned three TDs. Renua, a party formed by a breakaway of Fine Gael TDs opposed to the Protection of Life During Pregnancy Act, lost all its seats. After the election, a Fine Gael–independent minority government was formed with confidence and supply from Fianna Fáil, a precursor to the two parties agreeing a coalition in 2020 and ending the historic civil war divide in Irish politics. Enda Kenny became Fine Gael's longest-serving Taoiseach before stepping down in 2017 and being replaced by Leo Varadkar.

== Notes and references ==
=== Bibliography ===
- Boyle, Dan (2017). Making Up the Numbers: Small Parties and Independents in Irish Politics. Dublin: The History Press Ireland. ISBN 9781845889548.
- Buckley, Fiona; McGing, Claire (2011). "Women and the Election". In Gallagher, Michael; Marsh, Michael (eds.). How Ireland Voted 2011: The Story of Ireland's Earthquake Election. Basingstoke: Palgrave Macmillan. pp. 222–39. ISBN 9780230348813.
- Carty, R. Kenneth (2022). "Europe's Greatest Electoral Machine: Ireland's Fianna Fáil". The Government Party: Political Dominance in Democracy. Oxford University Press. pp. 32–48. ISBN 9780191949296.
- Coakley, John (2011). "The final Seanad election?". In Gallagher, Michael; Marsh, Michael (eds.). How Ireland Voted 2011: The Story of Ireland's Earthquake Election. Basingstoke: Palgrave Macmillan. pp. 240–63. ISBN 9780230348813.
- Collins, Stephen, ed. (2011). Nealon's Guide to the 31st Dáil and 24th Seanad. Dublin: Gill Books. ISBN 9780717150595.
- Collins, Stephen; Meehan, Ciara (2020). Saving the State: Fine Gael from Collins to Varadkar. Dublin: Gill Books. ISBN 9780717189731.
- Constituency Commission (2007). Report on Dáil and European Parliament Constituencies 2007 (PDF). Dublin: The Stationery Office.
- de Bréadún, Deaglán (2015). Power Play: The Rise of Modern Sinn Féin. Newbridge: Merrion Press. ISBN 9781785370311.
- Dowling, Brian (2011). "Payback time". In McCarthy, Deirdre (ed.). The Week in Politics: Election 2011 and the 31st Dáil. Dublin: RTÉ. pp. 24–5. ISBN 9780956894502.
- Ferriter, Diarmaid (2024). The Revelation of Ireland: 1995–2020. London: Profile Books. ISBN 9781800810945.
- Gallagher, Michael (1988). "Ireland: The increasing role of the centre". In Marsh, Michael; Gallagher, Michael (eds.). Candidate Selection in Comparative Perspective: The Secret Garden of Politics. London: SAGE Publications. pp. 119–44. ISBN 0803981244.
- Gallagher, Michael (2011). "Ireland's Earthquake Election: Analysis of the Results". In Gallagher, Michael; Marsh, Michael (eds.). How Ireland Voted 2011: The Story of Ireland's Earthquake Election. Basingstoke: Palgrave Macmillan. pp. 139–71. ISBN 9780230348813.
- Gallagher, Michael; Marsh, Michael (2011). "Chronology of the 2011 Election Campaign". In Gallagher, Michael; Marsh, Michael (eds.). How Ireland Voted 2011: The Story of Ireland's Earthquake Election. Basingstoke: Palgrave Macmillan. Preface. ISBN 9780230348813.
- Gilmore, Eamon (2015). Inside the Room: The Untold Story of Ireland's Crisis Government. Newbridge: Merrion Press. ISBN 9781785370359.
- Hannon, Katie (2011). "Word wars". In McCarthy, Deirdre (ed.). The Week in Politics: The 2011 Election and the 31st Dáil. Dublin: RTÉ. pp. 44–5. ISBN 9780956894502.
- Healy, Blathnaid (2011). "Defeat by tweet". In McCarthy, Deirdre (ed.). The Week in Politics: The 2011 Election and the 31st Dáil. Dublin: RTÉ. pp. 46–7. ISBN 9780956894502.
- Houses of the Oireachtas (2011). 31st Dáil General Election, February 2011, Election Results and Transfer of Votes (PDF). Archived from the original (PDF) on 24 September 2015.
- Joint Committee of Inquiry into the Banking Crisis (27 January 2016). "Chapter 5: Government Policy and the Oireachtas". Report of the Joint Committee of Inquiry into the Banking Crisis. Dublin: Houses of the Oireachtas.
- Leahy, Pat (2011). "Campaign Strategies and Political Marketing". In Gallagher, Michael; Marsh, Michael (eds.). How Ireland Voted 2011: The Story of Ireland's Earthquake Election. Basingstoke: Palgrave Macmillan. pp. 68–88. ISBN 9780230348813.
- Leahy, Pat (2013). The Price of Power: Inside Ireland's Crisis Coalition. London: Penguin. ISBN 9780241957820.
- Mair, Peter (2011). "The Election in Context". In Gallagher, Michael; Marsh, Michael (eds.). How Ireland Voted 2011: The Story of Ireland's Earthquake Election. Basingstoke: Palgrave Macmillan. pp. 283–300. ISBN 9780230348813.
- Marsh, Michael (2011). "Poll position". In McCarthy, Deirdre (ed.). The Week in Politics: Election 2011 and the 31st Dáil. Dublin: RTÉ. pp. 32–5. ISBN 9780956894502.
- Marsh, Michael; Cunningham, Kevin (2011). "A Positive Choice, or Anyone But Fianna Fáil?". In Gallagher, Michael; Marsh, Michael (eds.). How Ireland Voted 2011: The Story of Ireland's Earthquake Election. Basingstoke: Palgrave Macmillan. pp. 172–204. ISBN 9780230348813.
- McCullagh, David (2011). "Watershed?". In McCarthy, Deirdre (ed.). The Week in Politics: Election 2011 and the 31st Dáil. Dublin: RTÉ. pp. 20–1. ISBN 9780956894502.
- McCullagh, David (2012). "'A Particular View of What Was Possible': Labour in Government". In Daly, Paul; O'Brien, Rónán; Rouse, Paul (eds.). Making the Difference?: The Irish Labour Party 1912–2012. Cork: The Collins Press. pp. 107–24. ISBN 9781848899704.
- McElroy, Gail (2017). "Party Competition in Ireland: The Emergence of a Left-Right Dimension?". In Marsh, Michael; Farrell, David M.; McElroy, Gail (eds.). A Conservative Revolution? Electoral Change in Twenty-First-Century Ireland. Oxford University Press. pp. 61–79. ISBN 9780198744030.
- Murphy, Gary (2011). "The Background to the Election". In Gallagher, Michael; Marsh, Michael (eds.). How Ireland Voted 2011: The Story of Ireland's Earthquake Election. Basingstoke: Palgrave Macmillan. pp. 1–28. ISBN 9780230348813.
- Murphy, Gary (2012). "Seeking the Fianna Fáil Vote: Why Do Interest Groups Run for Office in Ireland?". In Weeks, Liam; Clark, Alastair (eds.). Radical or Redundant? Minor Parties in Irish Politics. Dublin: The History Press Ireland. pp. 142–58. ISBN 978-1845887445.
- Murphy, Gary (2016). Electoral Competition in Ireland since 1987. Manchester University Press. ISBN 9780719097669.
- O'Leary, Olivia (2011). "The saddest election". In McCarthy, Deirdre (ed.). The Week in Politics: Election 2011 and the 31st Dáil. Dublin: RTÉ. pp. 52–3. ISBN 9780956894502.
- O'Malley, Eoin (2011). "Government Formation in 2011". In Gallagher, Michael; Marsh, Michael (eds.). How Ireland Voted 2011: The Story of Ireland's Earthquake Election. Basingstoke: Palgrave Macmillan. pp. 264–82. ISBN 9780230348813.
- O'Malley, Eoin; Flynn, Roddy; McMenamin, Iain; Rafter, Kevin (2013). "Mediating Elections in Ireland: Empirical Evidence from the 2011 General Election". In O'Brien, Mark; Ó Beacháin, Donnacha (eds.). Political Communications in Ireland: Politics, Media and the Public. Liverpool University Press. pp. 217–36. ISBN 9781781380277. SSRN 2287843.
- O'Malley, Eoin; Fitzgibbon, John (2014). "Everywhere and Nowhere: Populism and the Puzzling Non-Reaction to Ireland's Crises". In Kreisi, Hanspeter; Pappas, Takis S. (eds.). European Populism in the Shadow of the Great Recession. Colchester: ECPR Press. pp. 287–302. ISBN 9781785521386. SSRN 2496354.
- O'Malley, Eoin; Murphy, Gary (2018). "The Leadership Difference? Context and Choice in Fianna Fáil's Party Leadership". In O'Malley, Eoin; McGraw, Sean (eds.). One Party Dominance: Fianna Fáil and Irish Politics 1926–2016. Abingdon: Routledge. pp. 118–40. ISBN 9781315143019.
- Puirséil, Niamh (2018). "Fianna Fáil and the Evolution of an Ambiguous Ideology". In O'Malley, Eoin; McGraw, Sean (eds.). One Party Dominance: Fianna Fáil and Irish Politics 1926–2016. Abingdon: Routledge. pp. 49–71. ISBN 9781315143019.
- Quinlan, Stephen; Okolikj, Martin (2018). "The Decline of a Dominant Political Monolith: Understanding Fianna Fáil's Vote 1987–2016". In O'Malley, Eoin; McGraw, Sean (eds.). One Party Dominance: Fianna Fáil and Irish Politics 1926–2016. Abingdon: Routledge. pp. 164–90. ISBN 9781315143019.
- Rafter, Kevin (2011). The Road to Power: How Fine Gael Made History. Dublin: New Island Books. ISBN 9781848401174.
- Reidy, Theresa (2011). "Candidate Selection". In Gallagher, Michael; Marsh, Michael (eds.). How Ireland Voted 2011: The Story of Ireland's Earthquake Election. Basingstoke: Palgrave Macmillan. pp. 47–67. ISBN 9780230348813.
- Suiter, Jane; Farrell, David M. (2011). "The Parties' Manifestos". In Gallagher, Michael; Marsh, Michael (eds.). How Ireland Voted 2011: The Story of Ireland's Earthquake Election. Basingstoke: Palgrave Macmillan. pp. 29–46. ISBN 9780230348813.
- Weeks, Liam (2012). "The Dog That Failed to Bark: Why Did No New Party Emerge in 2011?". In Weeks, Liam; Clark, Alastair (eds.). Radical or Redundant? Minor Parties in Irish Politics. Dublin: The History Press Ireland. pp. 7–26. ISBN 978-1845887445.
- Wall, Matthew; Sudulich, Maria Laura (2011). "Internet Explorers: The Online Campaign". In Gallagher, Michael; Marsh, Michael (eds.). How Ireland Voted 2011: The Story of Ireland's Earthquake Election. Basingstoke: Palgrave Macmillan. pp. 89–106. ISBN 9780230348813.
- Whelan, Noel (2011a). Fianna Fáil: A Biography of the Party. Dublin: Gill Books. ISBN 9780717151981.

=== Journal articles ===
- Arlow, Jonathan (2025). "Comparing Sinn Féin between North and South: Do institutional context and varying public attitudes drive party policy preferences?". The British Journal of Politics and International Relations. 27 (3): 839–64. doi:10.1177/13691481241303280.
- Buckley, Fiona (2013). "Women and politics in Ireland: The road to sex quotas". Irish Political Studies. 28 (3): 341–59. doi:10.1080/07907184.2013.818537.
- Farrell, Sean; Meehan, Ciara; Murphy, Gary; Rafter, Kevin (Autumn 2011). "Assessing the Irish General Election of 2011: A Roundtable". New Hibernia Review / Iris Éireannach Nua. 15 (3): 36–53. doi:10.1353/nhr.2011.0042. JSTOR 23068119.
- FitzGerald, John; Kearney, Ide (6 September 2011). "Irish Government Debt And Implied Debt Dynamics" (PDF). Economic and Social Research Institute (Special Article).
- Gallagher, Michael (1992). "Comparing Proportional Representation Electoral Systems: Quotas, Thresholds, Paradoxes and Majorities". British Journal of Political Science. 22 (4): 469–496. doi:10.1017/S0007123400006499. ISSN 0007-1234. JSTOR 194023.
- Hardiman, Niamh; Regan, Aidan (January 2013). "The Politics of Austerity in Ireland". Intereconomics. 48 (1): 4–32. doi:10.1007/s10272-013-0441-3. hdl:10197/4222.
- Lynch, Kevin; Hogan, John (2012). "How Irish Political Parties are Using Social Networking Sites to Reach Generation Z: an Insight into a New Online Social Network in a Small Democracy". Irish Communication Review. 13: 83–98. doi:10.21427/D7CT65.
- Lysaght, Ruth (2011). "TG4 Leaders' Debate Election 2011: The Image of the Irish Language on Screen". The Canadian Journal of Irish Studies. 37 (1/2): 156–77. JSTOR 41955744.
- Madden, David (Spring 2018). "The Base of Party Political Support in Ireland: A New Approach". The Economic and Social Review. 49 (1): 17–44.
- Marsh, Michael; Mikhaylov, Slava (September 2012). "Economic voting in a crisis: The Irish election of 2011". Electoral Studies. 31 (3): 478–84. doi:10.1016/j.electstud.2012.02.010.
- Marsh, Michael; Mikhaylov, Slava (2014). "A Conservative Revolution: The Electoral Response to Economic Crisis in Ireland" (PDF). Journal of Elections, Public Opinion and Parties. 24 (2): 160–179. doi:10.1080/17457289.2014.887719.
- Patterson, Henry (1988). "Fianna Fáil and the Working Class: The Origins of the Enigmatic Relationship". Saothar: Journal of Irish Labour History. 13: 81–8. JSTOR 23196031.
- Reidy, Theresa; Buckley, Fiona (2017). "Democratic revolution? Evaluating the Political and Administrative Reform Landscape after the Economic Crisis". Administration. 65 (2): 1–12. doi:10.1515/admin-2017-0012.
- Reidy, Theresa; White, Timothy J. (2017). "Political Transformation in Ireland: Boom, Bust and Beyond". Éire–Ireland. 52 (1/2): 101–23. doi:10.1353/eir.2017.0005.
- White, Timothy J. (2011a). "The 2011 Irish General Election: Critical, Realigning, Deviating, or Something Else?". Irish Journal of Public Policy. 3 (2): 77–90. doi:10.33178/ijpp.3.2.7.
