= Election promise =

Promise or guarantee made by a candidate

An election promise or campaign promise is a promise or guarantee made to the public by a candidate or political party that is trying to win an election.

Across the Western world, political parties are highly likely to fulfill their election promises. In the United States, platform positions offer important clues as to the policies that U.S. parties will enact. Over the past 30 years, Democratic and Republican congresspeople voted in line with their respective party platforms 74% and 89% of the time, respectively.

== Fulfilling promises ==
A 2017 study in the American Journal of Political Science found that for 12 countries (Austria, Bulgaria, Canada, Germany, Ireland, Italy, the Netherlands, Portugal, Spain, Sweden, the United Kingdom, and the United States) found that political parties fulfill their promises to voters to a considerable extent:

Parties that hold executive office after elections generally fulfill substantial percentages, sometimes very high percentages, of their election pledges, whereas parties that do not hold executive office generally find that lower percentages of their pledges are fulfilled. The fulfillment of pledges by governing executive parties varies across governments in ways that reflect power-sharing arrangements. The main power-sharing arrangement that impacts pledge fulfillment distinguishes between single-party governments and coalitions, not between governments with and without legislative majorities. We found the highest percentages of pledge fulfillment for governing parties in the United Kingdom, Sweden, Portugal, Spain, and Canada, most of which governed in single-party executives. We found lower percentages for governing parties in Germany, the Netherlands, Austria, Bulgaria, Ireland, and Italy, most of which governed in coalitions. Pledge fulfillment by U.S. presidential parties lies at the higher end of coalition governments, which suggests that U.S. presidents are more constrained than governing parties in single-party parliamentary systems, but less constrained than most governing parties in multiparty coalitions.

Other research on the United States suggests that Democratic and Republican congresspeople voted in line with their respective party platforms 74% and 89% of the time, respectively.

=== Examples of broken promises ===
- The British Liberal Party's pledge to cut army spending, before embarking on the Dreadnought arms race with Germany.
- The British Labour Party's 1945 pledge to set up a new ministry of housing.
- Australian Prime Minister Bob Hawke, in 1987, said that "by 1990 no Australian child will be living in poverty"
- George H. W. Bush promised not to raise taxes while president during his 1988 campaign. This was best remembered in a speech at the Republican National Convention when he said "Congress will push and push...and I'll say Read my lips: no new taxes". After a recession began during his term and the deficit widened, Bush agreed to proposals to increase taxes. Although not the only broken promise concerning taxes, it was by far the most famous.
- In 1994, upon entering Italian politics, media tycoon Silvio Berlusconi promised that he would sell his assets in Fininvest (later Mediaset), because of the conflict of interest it would have generated, a promise he repeated a number of times in later years, but after 12 years and having served three terms as prime minister, he still retained ownership of his company that controls virtually all the Italian private TV stations and a large number of magazines and publishing houses, which have extensively been used in favour of his political party.
- Australian Prime Minister John Howard in 1995 that the GST would "never ever" be part of Liberal policy (the tax package was not implemented that term but was put to the Australian people at the next election in 1998 that re-elected Howard)
- During the 2000 U.S. Presidential election campaign, George W. Bush said, "If we don't stop extending our troops all around the world in nation-building missions, then we're going to have a serious problem coming down the road. And I'm going to prevent that."
- In Ireland, Fianna Fáil's 2002 election promise to "permanently end all hospital waiting lists" by 2004 and to "create a world class health service" through reform and expanding healthcare coverage with "200,000 extra medical cards".
- When asked about the issue of carbon taxation, Prime Minister Julia Gillard responded by saying "There will be no carbon tax under the government I lead. What we will do is we will tackle the challenge of climate change." In February 2011, Gillard then announced a carbon pricing mechanism in order to secure a minority government. This has been construed by some as being a broken promise, with debate centering on whether or not a fixed price leading into a trading scheme can be called a 'tax'.
- Before the 2011 Irish general election, the then Labour Party leader Eamon Gilmore infamously said "Frankfurt's Way or Labour's Way" in reference to the EU/IMF deal. After being elected to power the party went on to accept the deal.
- Former U.S. President Barack Obama vowed repeatedly during the 2008 election to close the Guantanamo Bay detention camp in Cuba, but the prison remained open the entirety of his Presidency and remains so as of August 2023.
- In the 2010 election to the U.K. House of Commons, the Liberal Democrat Party candidates took a pledge to oppose any increase in university tuition fees and campaign for their abolition. After forming a coalition government with the Tories, 21 of 57 Liberal Democrat MPs voted to increase the fees.
- During the Canadian federal election in 2015, Justin Trudeau promised to replace the first-past-the-post electoral system before the next federal election. He later rescinded this promise.
- President Donald Trump, as a candidate in the 2016 presidential election, promised that he would imprison Democratic nominee Hillary Clinton over her email controversy, most notably during the 2016 Republican National Convention and the second presidential debate. After becoming President-elect, Trump announced he would not actually charge Clinton with any wrongdoing. The Trump Administration did not take any action against Clinton.
- In the 2019 general election in the United Kingdom the Conservative Party, led by Boris Johnson, pledged in their manifesto to not raise the rate of income tax, VAT or National Insurance. In September 2021, Johnson announced that National Insurance would be increased by 1.25 percentage points from April 2022 to raise money for the National Health Service and social care.
- In the 2023 parliamentary and presidential elections in Turkey the Justice and Development Party, led by Recep Tayyip Erdoğan, pledged in their manifesto to provide tax exemption for the acquisition of mobile phones and computers for youth in higher education for once without giving details of whether it will apply to imported or domestic products. In August 2023, Erdoğan's cabinet announced that tax exemption for the acquisition of mobile phones and computers for youth would only encompass products produced or assembled in Turkey and have a price cap.

== See also ==
- Consent of the governed
- Mandate (politics)
- Manifesto
- Read my lips: no new taxes
- Social contract

== Notes ==
1. Parmet, Herbert S. (December 1989). The Devil We Knew: Americans and the Cold War. Little Brown & Co. ISBN 978-0-19-509377-3. p. 116 "Nixon didn't invent the phrase, which originated with a reporter looking for a lead to a story summarizing the Republican candidate's (hazy) promise to end the war without losing. But neither did he disavow the term, and it soon became a part of the campaign. When pressed for details, Nixon retreated to the not indefensible position that to tip his hand would interfere with the negotiations that had begun in Paris."; Parmet, Herbert S. (December 1989). Richard Nixon and His America. Little Brown & Co. ISBN 978-0-316-69232-8. Stated evidence suggests that Nixon never used the term, and that it actually came from a question by a voter at a New Hampshire campaign stop.
2. "Nixon: Vietnam Shows Need for 'New Diplomacy'". Cedar Rapids Gazette (Iowa). March 20, 1968. p. 62.
3. Morin, Relman (March 14, 1968). "Nixon Plans to Unfold Peace Plan When He Campaigns Against LBJ". Press Telegram (Long Beach, Cal.). p. 10.
4. Nixon, Richard (1978). RN: The Memoirs of Richard Nixon. Grosset & Dunlap. ISBN 9780448143743. p. 298
5. Coleman, Fred (1997). The Decline and Fall of Soviet Empire : Forty Years That Shook The World, From Stalin to Yeltsin. St. Martin's Griffin. ISBN 978-0-312-16816-2. p. 203
6. Anderson, Terry; Small, Melvin (1990). "Review of Johnson, Nixon, and the Doves". The American Historical Review. 95 (3): 944–945. doi:10.2307/2164514. JSTOR 2164514.
7. Small, Melvin (April 1988). Johnson, Nixon, and the Doves. Rutgers University Press. ISBN 978-0-8135-1288-4. p. 174; Zaroulis, Nancy and Gerald Sullivan (1984). Who Spoke Up? American Protest Against the War in Vietnam, 1963-1975. Doubleday. ISBN 978-0-03-005603-1. p. 217
8. Small p. 162
9. Small p. 179
10. Strauss, Robert S. (Summer 1984). "What's Right with U. S. Campaigns". Foreign Policy. 55 (55): 3–22. doi:10.2307/1148378. JSTOR 1148378.
11. See U.S. presidential election, 1900 Misleading Philippine War claims by the Republicans
12. Small, p. 166; Riegle, Don (1972). O Congress. Doubleday. p. 20; Kalb, Marvin and Bernard (1974). Kissinger. Hutchison. p. 120; Hersh, Seymour M. (1983). The Price of Power: Kissinger in the Nixon White House. Summit Books. ISBN 978-0-671-44760-1. p. 119
13. Solomon, Norman (December 22, 2005). "A New Phase of Bright Spinning Lies About Iraq". Common Dreams. Archived from the original on December 24, 2005.
14. The Most Controversial Political Campaigns in World History
