= Parish pump politics =

Parish pump politics is a term used to describe political activity focused on local or constituency interests at the expense of broader national policy issues. The term is often used pejoratively in Ireland to refer to parochialism and elected representatives prioritizing the securing of public resources or services for their own constituencies. The phrase derives from the historical role of the parish water pump as a focal point of community life.

== Ireland ==
Parish pump politics has been identified by scholars as a longstanding feature of Irish political culture. Academic Isabel Kusche has defined the term in Ireland as "not synonymous with brokerage or clientelism" but "frequently used to denote the localistic outlook of deputies and parliamentary proceedings that is linked to an extreme emphasis on constituency service." Political scientist David Farrell in 2011 stated Ireland was unusual in that "historically, parish pump politics has been the biggest determinant" of national elections, while "policy has always played second fiddle".

In 1981, the Eurobarometer survey found that Irish voters had the most parochial expectations of their elected representatives compared to other European countries. Noel Gallagher and Lee Komito in 2017 noted "successive [Irish National Election Study] datasets show how deeply rooted in Irish political culture is the expectation that TDs will give high priority to the constituency representation role", though also concluded that "a heavy constituency workload is the norm for parliamentarians around the world".

The Irish electoral system of single transferable vote, where local constituencies elect multiple representatives, has been noted to incentivize Irish members of parliament (TDs) to solve as many individual constituent problems as possible.

Notable examples of TDs viewed as emphasizing parish pump politics have included the Healy-Rae family and Finian McGrath, who in 2018 defended his pushing for services in own constituency by stating "parish-pump politics is part of who I am". Critics of parish pump politics have argued that focusing on local issues has led to less success in dealing with those on the national level; for example, Fianna Fáil former minister Noel Dempsey blamed "parish pump politics" for a perceived inadequate response by the government to the Great Recession.

== Other jurisdictions ==
In 2024, former Maltese foreign affairs minister Evarist Bartolo stated the country had "retreated into parish-pump politics, which is more concerned with addressing the immediate needs of the local electorate than with strategy that might affect our long-term well-being" since joining the EU.

== See also ==
- Political particularism
- Parochialism
- Localism (politics)
- Gombeen man
