= Every Little Hurts =

"Every Little Hurts" is a campaign slogan used by the Irish Labour Party on an advertisement ahead of the 2011 general election. It is based on a similar advertisement for the Tesco chain of supermarkets. It has since been considered as an "unprecedented step of using an American-style attack" on the party's political rivals.

"Every Little Hurts" featured six cuts and charges the Labour Party claimed Fine Gael would bring in if it was allowed form a single-party government. After the election Labour went into coalition with Fine Gael and helped bring these in themselves, though with more force than they themselves predicted. The then Labour Party leader Eamon Gilmore gave "Every Little Hurts" his approval after viewing it on his tablet computer device.

Former Labour minister Pat Rabbitte was referring to "Every Little Hurts" when he made his infamous "Isn't that what you tend to do during an election" comment on The Week in Politics in 2012. The poster was also blamed for an internal cabinet row over water charges between coalition members in 2014.

Gilmore later claimed in his book Inside the Room: The Untold Story of Ireland's Crisis Government that he had paid little attention to the details contained within and blamed his advisor Mark Garrett and Garrett's team for putting it together.

Among the Labour TDs to speak out against their own party's advertisement during the 31st Dáil were Aodhán Ó Ríordáin and John Lyons. Harry McGee of The Irish Times described it as "a pre-election stunt that has become a huge embarrassment for the party." Labour's political opponents repeatedly referred to it in the years afterwards. Following Labour's disastrous 2016 general election campaign, "Every Little Hurts" was blamed for the result.
