= IPPOSI =

IPPOSI, the Irish Platform for Patients’ Organisations, Science & Industry, is a Company Limited by Guarantee and a charity based in Dublin. It describes itself as "a patient-led organisation that works with patients, government, industry, science and academia to put patients at the heart of health policy and innovation."

Laura Brady is the Chief Executive. It is particularly focussed on issues associated with the use of patients' data. It runs a Patient Education Programme concentrating on clinical trials Health Technology Assessment, health information, connected health and rare diseases and on how drug treatments are financed. It works with the European Patients' Academy on Therapeutic Innovation (EUPATI) and Dublin City University's Centre for eIntegrated Care.

It runs conferences and seminars on a variety of topics including data protection.

It is associated with the European Platform for Patients’ Organisations, Science & Industry, based in Brussels which was established in 1994 as part of the initiative to promote patients' rights.
