= Jane Suiter =

Irish political scientist

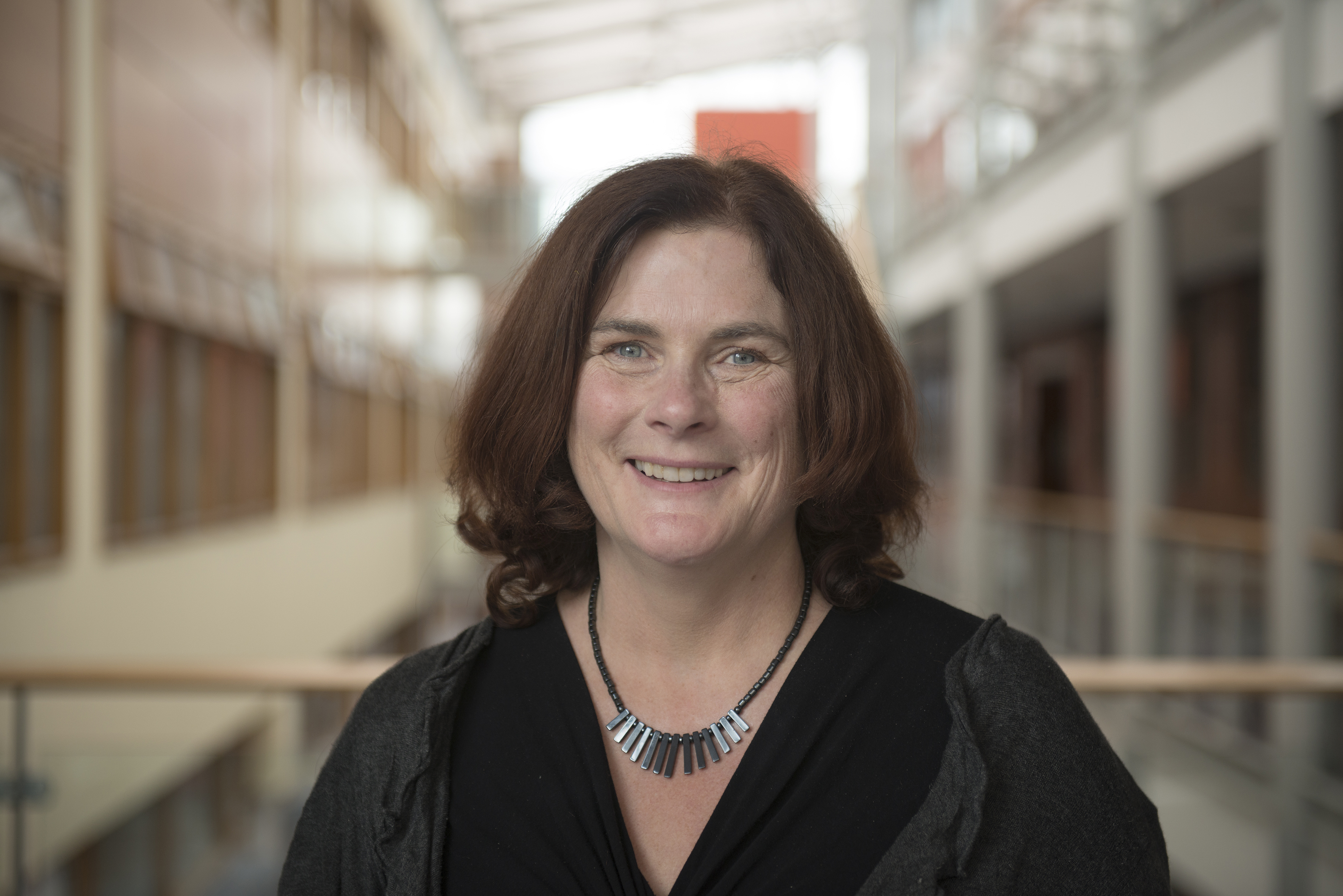
- Occupation: Political scientist

Academic background
- Education: Trinity College Dublin
- Thesis: Chieftains delivering : political determinants of capital spending in Ireland 2001-07 (2011)

Academic work
- Institutions: Dublin City University

Jane Suiter is an Irish political scientist, professor and director of Dublin City University's Institute for Future Media, Democracy, and Society ("FuJo") and research lead of Ireland's Constitutional Convention and the Citizens' Assembly. She is the co-author or co-editor of three academic books and one guide book, and over 40 journal articles. In December 2020, she was named "Researcher of the Year" by the Irish Research Council and in February 2021, she was promoted to the position of professor by DCU.

== Career ==
Suiter began her career at the FT Group and AP Dow Jones, and joined The Irish Times in 1996, before becoming economics editor in 2001. She earned a doctorate from Trinity College Dublin's political science department in 2010. As a media commentator she has contributed to BBC News, The Washington Post, and The Late Debate on RTÉ Radio 1.

At Dublin City University, she has specialised in the fields of deliberative democracy, journalism, and disinformation. In 2018 she led a research project "journalism and Leadership Transformation" as well as a European Commission Horizon 2020-funded project "Provenance" with Science Foundation Ireland's ADAPT stream to tackle online disinformation. She is a visiting Fellow at the Reuters Institute for the Study of Journalism, Oxford University.

In 2020 she co-authored a study into behaviours and attitudes during the 2020 COVID-19 lockdown. She is co-editor of the Taylor & Francis academic journal Journal of Contemporary European Studies.

=== Public projects ===
In 2011, Suiter created (with University College Dublin political scientist David M. Farrell) "We the Citizens", a national initiative to increase public engagement with politics. The pair convened the Constitutional Convention in 2012, as well as the Citizens' Assembly on the Eighth Amendment of the Constitution in 2016, both of which reviewed potential constitutional changes in the Irish state. This culminated in successful referendums; the Thirty-fourth Amendment of the Constitution of Ireland introduced marriage equality and the Thirty-sixth repealed the constitutional ban on abortion. The project was awarded the Brown Medal for Democracy in 2019 by the McCourtney Institute for Democracy at Penn State University. In 2020, Suiter, Farrell, TU Dublin's Yvonne Galligan and Simon Niemeyer of the Australian Citizen's Parliament, received a research fellowship to convene the Citizens' Assembly on Gender Equality.

In 2021, Suiter convened a Citizen's jury for IPPOSI, a patients' advocacy group, to consider how medical information could best be centralised to ensure maximal patient benefit will minimise privacy and sensitivity concerns.

=== Work with the Royal Irish Academy ===
Suiter is a member of the Social Sciences Committee of the Royal Irish Academy.

== Awards and honours ==
- DCU President's Research Award in the area of Humanities and Social Sciences, Business, Education and related areas 2018
- McCourtney Institute for Democracy at Penn State University, Brown Medal for Democracy (shared) 2019
- Irish Research Council's "Researcher of the Year" 2020

== Books ==
- Suiter, Jane; Trehy, Louise (2003). Dublin for Kids: 800 Things to Do in and Around Dublin for the Family. Dublin: O'Brien Press. ISBN 978-0-86278-814-8.
- Reuchamps, Min; Suiter, Jane, eds. (2016). Constitutional Deliberative Democracy in Europe. Colchester, UK: ECPR. ISBN 978-1-78552-258-1.
- Farrell, David M.; Suiter, Jane (2019). Reimagining Democracy: Lessons in Deliberative Democracy from the Irish Front Line. Cornell University Press. ISBN 978-1-5017-4934-6.
- Culloty, Eileen; Suiter, Jane (2021). Disinformation and Manipulation in Digital Media: Information Pathologies. Routledge. ISBN 978-1-000-35667-0.

== Personal life ==
Suiter married music journalist Leo Finlay in 1990. English rock band Blur, played at the reception in King's Inns, Dublin. They had one son. Finlay died in 1996.
