= Frankfurt's Way or Labour's Way =

"Frankfurt's Way or Labour's Way" (sometimes repeated as "Labour's Way or Frankfurt's Way") was a campaign slogan used by the then Irish Labour Party leader Eamon Gilmore in advance of the country's 2011 general election. The phrase has become an archetypal example of a broken election promise in Irish politics. Described as "a desperate attempt to get votes", Gilmore claimed on 3 February 2011 that the Labour Party (if put into power) would renegotiate the recent EU-IMF deal brought in under the Fianna Fáil-Green Party coalition. The promise was made as Gilmore launched Labour's economic plan. Frankfurt (in Germany) is the location of the headquarters of the European Central Bank (ECB). The party made a very strong showing, almost doubling its share of the vote to become the second-largest party in the Dáil, its best showing ever. It then formed its own coalition with Fine Gael, but did not renegotiate the deal.

In 2012, after a decline of 25 per cent in their vote previous year's election evaporated, the Irish Independent said the Labour Party was "haunted" by the promise. The following month, the European Fiscal Compact was enshrined in the Constitution, thereby ensuring the very fiscal compliance Labour had vowed to oppose. Gilmore's promise was also mentioned following the rush through the Oireachtas of legislation to liquidate IBRC in 2013. Even Labour stalwart Fergus Finlay admitted in 2015 that it was "a phrase he [Gilmore] had difficulty living down". However, Alan Kelly claimed "A lot of Labour's way was achieved" when quizzed on Gilmore's promise in 2015.

In Labour's centenary year, state television (RTÉ) produced a two-part documentary on the history of the party, titled Labour's Way.
