= Gombeen man =

Hiberno-English pejorative term

"Gombeen man" is a Hiberno-English term used in Ireland for a shady, small-time "wheeler-dealer" businessman who is always looking to make a quick and shady profit, often at someone else's expense or, in the case of politicians, through the acceptance or demanding of bribes. Its origin is the Irish language word gaimbín, meaning monetary interest or usury.

== Cultural significance ==
The despised image of the gombeen as an usurious predator on the poor was immortalized in the poem "The Gombeen Man" by Irish poet Joseph Campbell:

Behind a web of bottles, bales,
Tobacco, sugar, coffin nails,
The gombeen like a spider sits,
Surfeited; and, for all his wits,
As meagre as the tally-board,
On which his usuries are scored.

— Joseph Campbell, The Gombeen Man

While the phrase "gombeen man" is traditionally intended to refer to an unscrupulous and petty-tyrannical Irish Catholic who exploits his own people, it can be applied in relation to other groups such as, in this instance from James Joyce, to an Irish Jewish man:

-- O, Father Cowley said. A certain gombeen man of our acquaintance.
-- With a broken back, is it? Mr Dedalus asked.
-- The same, Simon, Father Cowley answered. Reuben of that ilk.

— James Joyce, Ulysses; "Episode X: Wandering Rocks"

Crime writer Kyril Bonfiglioli wrote a dark short story called "The Gombeen Man" about just such a character in the late '70s.

This excerpt is from The Crock of Gold, by James Stephens: "... the women were true to their own doctrines and refused to part with information to any persons saving only those of high rank, such as policemen, gombeen men, and district and county councillors; but even to these they charged high prices for their information, and a bonus on any gains which accrued through the following of their advices [sic]."

More generally, "gombeen" is now an adjective referring to all kinds of underhand or corrupt activities and to the mindset possessed by those engaged in such activities. In Irish politics, it is used to condemn an opponent for dishonesty or corruption, although its definition has become less precise with time and usage and it can also imply pettiness and close-mindedness. Alternative modern parlance for a gombeen man is someone "on the make". It is also used to describe certain Independent politicians who are seen to prioritize their constituents needs, no matter how trivial, over national interests.

== Modern use ==
- "Goodbye Gombeen Man", a Sunday Times headline from 1994, which was referred to in a 2 December 2004 Guardian article. "Mr Reynolds had objected to a 1994 Sunday Times article – headlined 'Goodbye gombeen man. Why a fib too far proved fatal' ..."
- In the 2016 Irish general election, the term Gombeenism or Gombeen man has been used with the term Parish pump politics (a pejorative term that implies local or vanity projects are put before national interests) by populist left-wing parties against mainstream establishment parties.
- William S. Burroughs, in his book The Adding Machine: Collected Essays, mentions and explains the Gombeen Man in a story entitled "Bugger The Queen." He posits the monarchy as a sort of country-wide Gombeen racket, and refers to the Queen as a Gombeen Woman.

== See also ==
- Fartsovka
- Kulak
- Political corruption
- Spiv
- Cute hoor at Wiktionary
- Gombeen at Wiktionary
