= European Platform for Patients' Organisations, Science and Industry =

The European Platform for Patients’ Organisations, Science & Industry, based in Brussels was established in 1994 as part of the initiative to promote patients' rights. It is an independent, not-for-profit, partnership-based and multi-stakeholder think tank. It is now also known as Digital Health Europe and is part of the European Patients Forum.

It is particularly concerned with Biobanking, geno-type research. It involves a number of European-facing umbrella patients’ organisations including patients' organisations, commercial enterprises and their related trade bodies, research institutes, professional and business federations.

John Peter Mary Wubbe, a Swiss transplant patient, is the Secretary General.
