= Deaglán de Bréadún =

Irish journalist and author

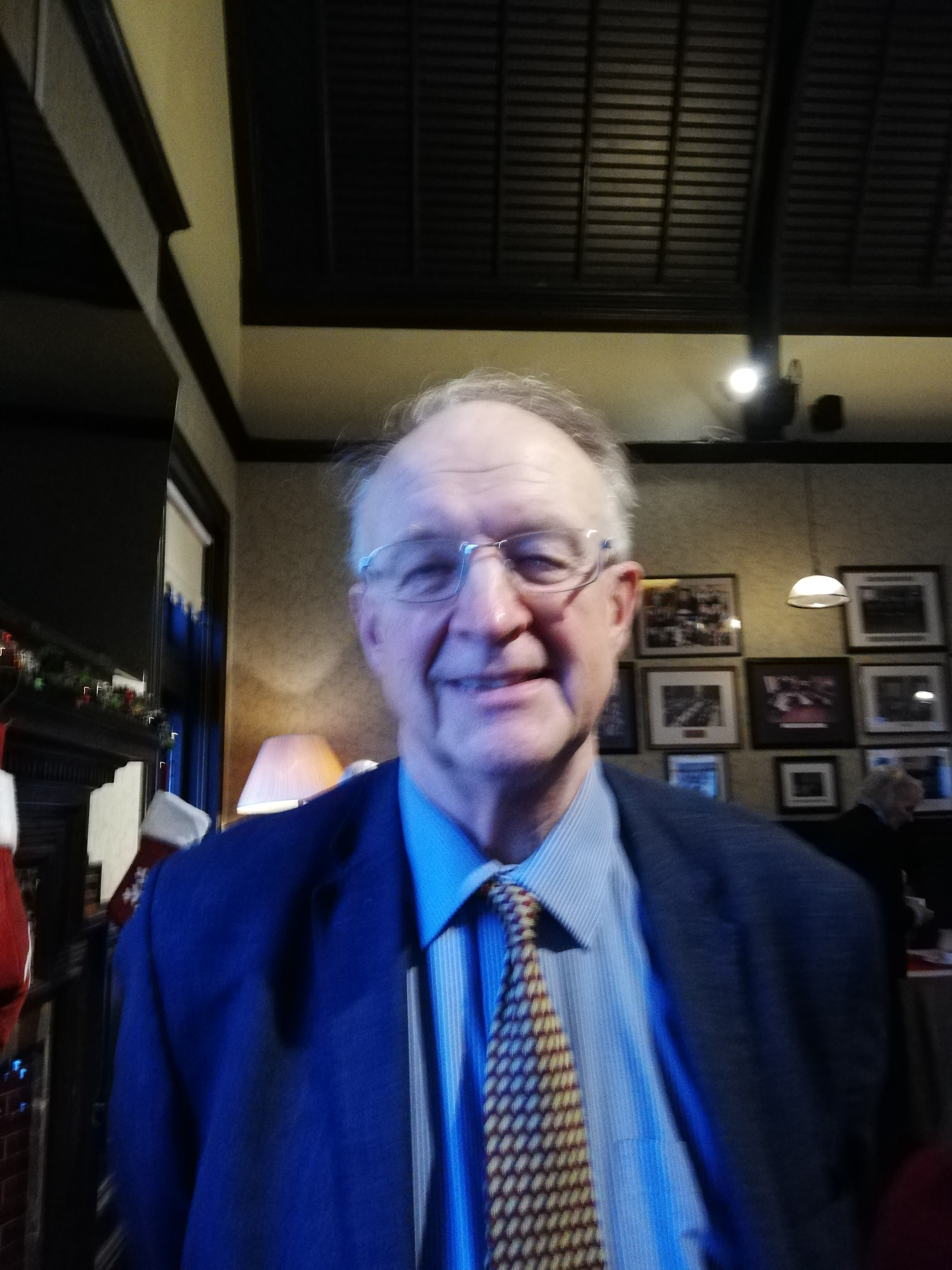
de Bréadún in 2023

Deaglán de Bréadún is an Irish journalist and author. He held a number of roles at The Irish Times, and published several books in both English and Irish.

== Education ==
A native of Enniscorthy in County Wexford, Deaglán de Bréadún has lived most of his life in Dublin and was educated at Synge Street CBS, University College Dublin, University of Tulsa, Oklahoma, and later at Trinity College Dublin.

== Work ==
De Bréadún joined The Irish Times as a journalist in 1978. While at the newspaper, he held a number of posts including Northern (Ireland) editor, foreign affairs correspondent, political correspondent and Irish language editor. He took early retirement from the newspaper at the end of 2012. He was later a contributor to the Sunday Independent and a broadcaster on political issues in English and Irish. He also worked from 2013 to 2014 as local radio correspondent at the Houses of the Oireachtas and from 2014 to 2015 as political editor of The Irish Sun.

He won the Northern Ireland IPR/BT award for Daily News Journalist of the Year as well as an award for his journalism in Irish. He has had two books published in English: The Far Side of Revenge (2001), a comprehensive 450-page account of the negotiations leading to the Good Friday Agreement which ended the Troubles in Northern Ireland; and Power Play (2015), which describes the rise of Sinn Féin as a political party in the aftermath of the Good Friday Agreement, along with three books in the Irish language.

He was a member of the Press Council of Ireland from 2013 to 2019, nominated by the National Union of Journalists (NUJ), and served the maximum period of two three-year terms. He has acted as the membership secretary of the Dublin Freelance Branch of the NUJ and also served on the advisory board of the union's magazine, The Journalist. He has also contributed to the Irish literary journal Comhar.

De Bréadún, who left The Irish Times in 2012, was listed as a contributor to the newspaper on its website as of February 2026.

== Publications ==
- The Far Side of Revenge: Making Peace in Northern Ireland (2001, second edition 2008)
- Power Play: The Rise of Modern Sinn Féin (2015)
- Sceallóga (Chips, 1990, a collection of short stories)
- Cinnlínte: Saol an Iriseora (Headlines: The Journalist's Life, 2016, a memoir)
- Scéalta Nuachta (News Stories, 2016, a collection of articles in Irish)
