= Kevin Rafter =

Irish academic and non-executive director

- Occupations: Professor; non-executive director; author

Kevin Rafter is an Irish academic and non-executive director. He is the author of numerous books on media and politics topics, having previously worked as a political journalist.

== Career ==
Rafter is currently Head of the School of Communications at Dublin City University where he is Full Professor of Political Communication. He is also Chairperson of the Compliance Committee of the Broadcasting Authority of Ireland and Chairperson of the Independent Advisory Committee of Culture Ireland.

He chaired an independent review panel on civil service reform in 2015 and was the independent rapporteur to the talks that led to the formation of Ireland's minority coalition in 2016. He is a board member of Dublin Bus and Oxfam Ireland.

In June 2019 Rafter was appointed chair of the Arts Council.

Prior to 2008, Rafter held editorial positions with the Irish Times (political reporter), Sunday Times (political correspondent), Sunday Tribune (political editor/assistant editor), Magill magazine (editor) and RTÉ, the Irish national broadcaster (Prime Time reporter and This Week presenter).

== Publications ==
Rafter has authored/edited over a dozen books including, most recently, Dillon Rediscovered: The Newspaperman Who Befriended Kings, Presidents and Oil Tycoons published by Martello, 2025.

His previous books include Political Advertising in the 2014 European Parliament Elections (2017), Martin Mansergh (2002) - and several histories of Irish political parties including Clann na Poblachta (1996), Sinn Féin (2005), Democratic Left (2010), and Fine Gael(2010)

His list of academic publications include numerous book chapters and research journal articles with a specific focus on media and politics including a study of Irish journalists in 2016.
