= David Farrell (political scientist) =

Political scientist

David Matthew Farrell (born 1960) is a political scientist. He was appointed to the Chair of Politics at University College Dublin in 2009, having returned to Ireland after two decades working at the University of Manchester, where from 2006–09 he was Head of the School of Social Sciences. A specialist in the study of electoral systems, elections and parties, he has published 15 books and over 90 articles and book chapters. His most recent books include: Political Parties and Democratic Linkage (2011), which was awarded the GESIS Klingemann Prize for the Best Comparative Study of Electoral Systems (CSES) Scholarship, and Electoral Systems (second edition, 2011). He is the founding co-editor of Party Politics, the President of the Political Studies Association of Ireland and the Speaker of the Council of the European Consortium for Political Research. In 2013 he was elected a Member of the Royal Irish Academy. In March 2019 he and Dr Jane Suiter were awarded the Brown Democracy Medal for the Irish Citizens' Assembly Project.
