= List of female ministers of state of the Republic of Ireland =

List of women appointed as Minister of State by the Government of Ireland

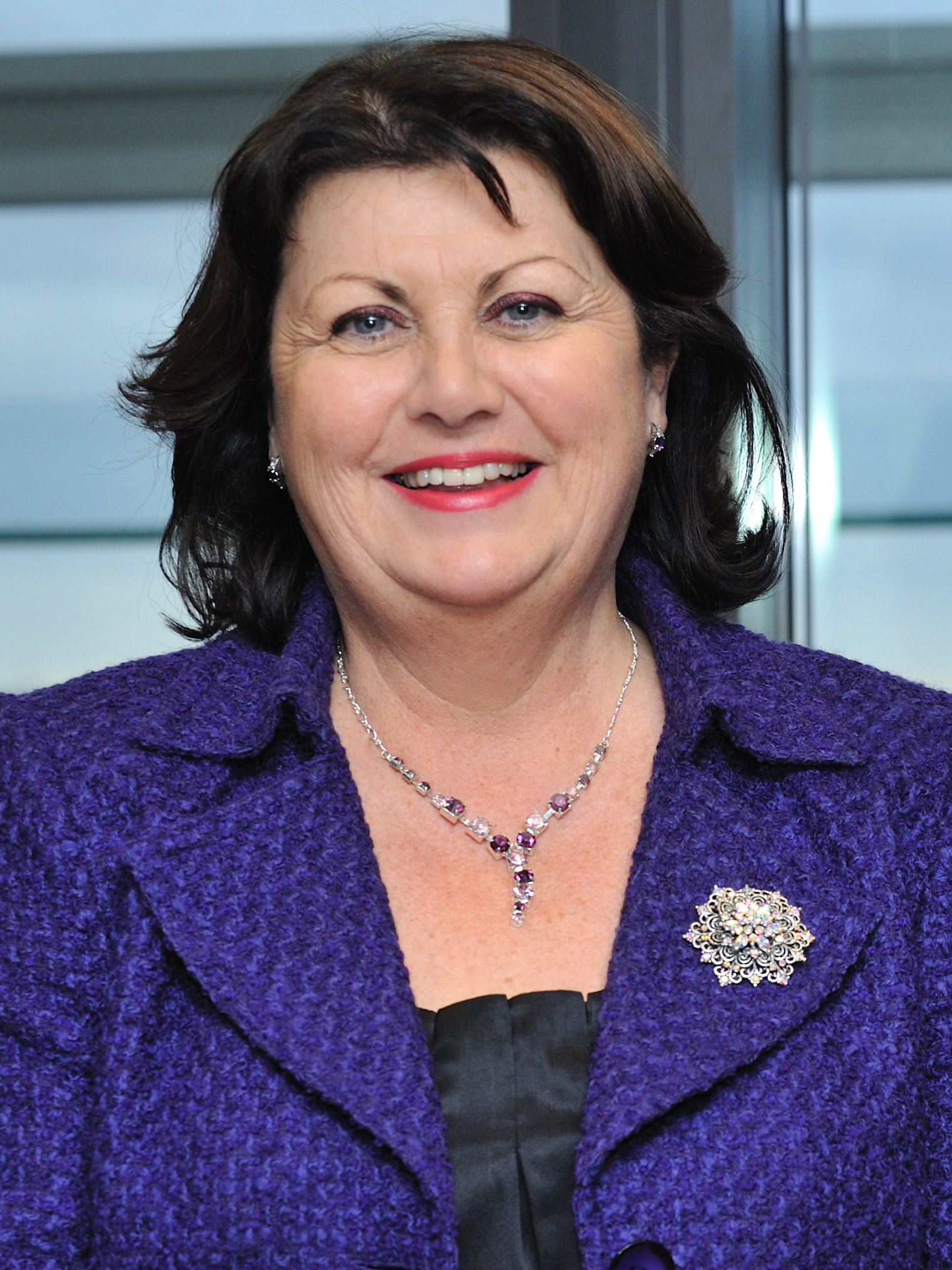
Máire Geoghegan-Quinn, who in 1977 became the first female parliamentary secretary; and in 1978 became the first female minister of state.

A minister of state in Ireland (also called a junior minister) is of non-cabinet rank attached to one or more Departments of state of the Government of Ireland and assists a minister of that government.

As of 2026, 38 women have served as ministers of state in Ireland. Six of the 23 ministers of state appointed by the government of Micheál Martin in January 2025 were women, with two regularly attending cabinet. Some Ministers of State, including the Government Chief Whip, attend cabinet meetings in a non-voting capacity, but are not members of the Government. They are formally known as "Minister of State attending Government", or colloquially as "Super Junior" ministers. There are currently four Ministers of State who regularly attend cabinet, two of whom are women.

== Appointment ==
The Ministers and Secretaries Act 1924 allowed the Executive Council (from 1937, the Government of Ireland) to appoint up to seven Parliamentary Secretaries to the Executive Council or to Executive Ministers. The Ministers and Secretaries (Amendment) (No. 2) Act 1977 abolished the position of Parliamentary Secretary, and created the new position of Minister of State. This Act was commenced on 1 January 1978. Unlike senior government ministers, who are appointed by the President of Ireland on the advice of the Taoiseach and the prior approval of Dáil Éireann, Ministers of State are appointed directly by the government, on the nomination of the Taoiseach. Members of either House of the Oireachtas (Dáil or Seanad) may be appointed to be a minister of state at a Department of state.

== History ==
Máire Geoghegan-Quinn was the first and only woman to be appointed as a Parliamentary Secretary, when she was appointed as Parliamentary Secretary to the Minister for Industry and Commerce by Jack Lynch in 1977. She was the first woman to be appointed as a minister of state in 1978, as Minister of State at the Department of Industry, Commerce and Energy. In 1979, Geoghegan-Quinn would become the first women appointed to cabinet since 1921. There has been at least one woman minister of state in all appointments since June 1981. To date, only one Senator, Pippa Hackett, who was appointed in June 2020, has been appointed as a minister of state.

== List of women ministers of state ==
Denotes incumbent minister of state

No.	Name	Department(s)	Responsibility	Party	Appointed	Left office	Taoiseach	Govt.
1	Máire Geoghegan-Quinn (Note: Also served as a senior cabinet minister.) (born 1950)	Industry and Commerce	Parliamentary Secretary	Fianna Fáil	5 July 1977	1 January 1978	Jack Lynch	15th
1	Máire Geoghegan-Quinn (born 1950)	Industry, Commerce and Energy	Minister of State	Fianna Fáil	1 January 1978	11 December 1979	Jack Lynch	15th
1	Máire Geoghegan-Quinn (born 1950)	Education	Youth and Sport	Fianna Fáil	23 March 1982	14 December 1982	Charles Haughey	18th
1	Máire Geoghegan-Quinn (born 1950)	Taoiseach	Co-ordination of Government policy and EC matters	Fianna Fáil	12 March 1987	12 July 1989	Charles Haughey	20th
1	Máire Geoghegan-Quinn (born 1950)	Taoiseach	Co-ordinator of Government Policy and EC matters	Fianna Fáil	19 July 1989	11 February 1992	Charles Haughey	21st
2	Mary Flaherty (born 1953)	Health; Social Welfare	Poverty and the Family	Fine Gael	30 June 1981	9 March 1982	Garret FitzGerald	17th
3	Nuala Fennell (1935–2009)	Taoiseach	Women's Affairs	Fine Gael	16 December 1982	10 March 1987	Garret FitzGerald	19th
3	Nuala Fennell (1935–2009)	Justice	Family Law Reform	Fine Gael	7 January 1983	10 March 1987	Garret FitzGerald	19th
4	Avril Doyle (born 1949)	Finance; Environment	Office of Public Works; Environmental Protection	Fine Gael	13 February 1986	10 March 1987	Garret FitzGerald	19th
4	Avril Doyle (born 1949)	Taoiseach; Finance; Transport, Energy and Communications	Consumers of Public Services	Fine Gael	27 January 1995	26 June 1997	John Bruton	24th
5	Mary Harney (born 1953)	Environment	Protection of the Environment	Progressive Democrats	19 July 1989	11 February 1992	Charles Haughey	21st
5	Mary Harney (born 1953)	Environment	Protection of the Environment	Progressive Democrats	11 February 1992	4 November 1992	Albert Reynolds	22nd
6	Mary O'Rourke (1937–2024)	Industry and Commerce	Trade and Marketing	Fianna Fáil	13 February 1992	12 January 1993	Albert Reynolds	22nd
6	Mary O'Rourke (1937–2024)	Enterprise and Employment	Labour Affairs	Fianna Fáil	14 January 1993	15 December 1994	Albert Reynolds	23rd
7=	Eithne FitzGerald (born 1950)	Finance	Office of the Tánaiste, National Development Plan	Labour	14 January 1993	17 November 1994	Albert Reynolds	23rd
7=	Eithne FitzGerald (born 1950)	Enterprise and Employment	Office of the Tánaiste, Labour Affairs	Labour	20 December 1994	26 June 1997	John Bruton	24th
7=	Joan Burton (born 1949)	Social Welfare	Poverty, Tax and Social Welfare Codes	Labour	14 January 1993	17 November 1994	Albert Reynolds	23rd
7=	Joan Burton (born 1949)	Foreign Affairs; Justice	Overseas Development Assistance	Labour	20 December 1994	26 June 1997	John Bruton	24th
9	Liz McManus (born 1947)	Environment	Environment	Democratic Left	20 December 1994	26 June 1997	John Bruton	24th
10	Liz O'Donnell (born 1956)	Foreign Affairs	Overseas Development Assistance, Human Rights	Progressive Democrats	1 July 1997	6 June 2002	Bertie Ahern	25th
10	Liz O'Donnell (born 1956)		Minister of State to the Government	Progressive Democrats	11 April 2002	6 June 2002	Bertie Ahern	25th
11	Mary Wallace (born 1959)	Justice, Equality and Law Reform	Equality, Disabilities	Fianna Fáil	8 July 1997	6 June 2002	Bertie Ahern	25th
11	Mary Wallace (born 1959)	Agriculture and Food	Forestry	Fianna Fáil	14 February 2006	14 June 2007	Bertie Ahern	26th
11	Mary Wallace (born 1959)	Agriculture, Fisheries and Food	Forestry	Fianna Fáil	20 June 2007	7 May 2008	Bertie Ahern	27th
11	Mary Wallace (born 1959)	Health and Children	Health Promotion, Food Safety	Fianna Fáil	13 May 2008	22 April 2009	Brian Cowen	28th
12	Mary Hanafin (born 1959)	Health and Children; Justice, Equality and Law Reform; Education and Science	Children	Fianna Fáil	1 February 2000	6 June 2002	Bertie Ahern	25th
12	Mary Hanafin (born 1959)	Taoiseach; Defence	Government Chief Whip, Defence, Information society	Fianna Fáil	6 June 2002	29 September 2004	Bertie Ahern	26th
13	Mary Coughlan (born 1965)	Arts, Heritage, Gaeltacht and the Islands	Gaeltacht, The Islands	Fianna Fáil	19 February 2001	6 June 2002	Bertie Ahern	25th
14	Síle de Valera (born 1954)	Education and Science	Adult Education, Youth Affairs, Educational Disadvantage	Fianna Fáil	19 June 2002	8 December 2006	Bertie Ahern	26th
15	Máire Hoctor (born 1963)	Health and Children; Social and Family Affairs; Environment, Heritage and Local Government	Services for Older People	Fianna Fáil	9 July 2007	7 May 2008	Bertie Ahern	27th
15	Máire Hoctor (born 1963)	Health and Children; Social and Family Affairs; Environment, Heritage and Local Government	Older People	Fianna Fáil	13 May 2008	22 April 2009	Brian Cowen	28th
16	Áine Brady (born 1954)	Health and Children; Social and Family Affairs; Environment, Heritage and Local Government	Older People, Health Promotion	Fianna Fáil	22 April 2009	9 March 2011	Brian Cowen	28th
17	Mary White (born 1948)	Justice and Law Reform; Community, Equality and Gaeltacht Affairs; Education and Skills	Equality and Human Rights, Integration	Green	23 March 2010	23 January 2011	Brian Cowen	28th
18=	Róisín Shortall (born 1954)	Health	Primary Care	Labour	10 March 2011	26 September 2012	Enda Kenny	29th
18=	Jan O'Sullivan (born 1950)	Foreign Affairs and Trade	Trade and Development	Labour	10 March 2011	20 December 2011	Enda Kenny	29th
18=	Jan O'Sullivan (born 1950)	Environment, Community and Local Government	Housing and Planning (Note: In attendance at cabinet as "super junior" minister.)	Labour	20 December 2011	11 July 2014	Enda Kenny	29th
18=	Kathleen Lynch (born 1953)	Justice and Equality; Health	Disability, Equality, Mental Health	Labour	10 March 2011	15 July 2014	Enda Kenny	29th
18=	Kathleen Lynch (born 1953)	Health	Primary Care, Mental Health, Disability	Labour	15 July 2014	6 May 2016	Enda Kenny	29th
18=	Lucinda Creighton (born 1980)	Taoiseach; Foreign Affairs and Trade	European Affairs	Fine Gael	10 March 2011	11 July 2013	Enda Kenny	29th
22	Ann Phelan (born 1961)	Agriculture, Food and the Marine; Transport, Tourism and Sport	Rural Economic Development, Rural Transport	Labour	15 July 2014	6 May 2016	Enda Kenny	29th
23	Regina Doherty (born 1971)	Taoiseach	Government Chief Whip	Fine Gael	6 May 2016	14 June 2017	Enda Kenny	30th
24=	Helen McEntee (born 1986)	Health	Mental Health, Older People	Fine Gael	19 May 2016	14 June 2017	Enda Kenny	30th
24=	Helen McEntee (born 1986)	Foreign Affairs and Trade	European Affairs	Fine Gael	20 June 2017	27 June 2020	Leo Varadkar	31st
24=	Marcella Corcoran Kennedy (born 1963)	Health	Health Promotion	Fine Gael	19 May 2016	14 June 2017	Enda Kenny	30th
24=	Catherine Byrne (born 1956)	Health; Housing, Planning, Community and Local Government	Communities, National Drugs Strategy	Fine Gael	19 May 2016	14 June 2017	Enda Kenny	30th
24=	Catherine Byrne (born 1956)	Health	Health Promotion, National Drugs Strategy	Fine Gael	20 June 2017	27 June 2020	Leo Varadkar	31st
27	Mary Mitchell O'Connor (born 1959)	Education and Skills	Higher Education	Fine Gael	14 June 2017	27 June 2020	Leo Varadkar	31st
28=	Hildegarde Naughton (born 1977)	Transport; Environment, Climate and Communications	International and Road Transport and Logistics; Postal Policy and Eircodes	Fine Gael	27 June 2020	21 December 2022	Micheál Martin	32nd
28=	Hildegarde Naughton (born 1977)	Health	Public Health, Wellbeing and the National Drugs Strategy	Fine Gael	21 December 2022	10 April 2024	Leo Varadkar	33rd
28=	Hildegarde Naughton (born 1977)	Taoiseach	Government Chief Whip	Fine Gael	21 December 2022	23 January 2025	Leo Varadkar	33rd
28=	Hildegarde Naughton (born 1977)	Education	Special education and inclusion	Fine Gael	10 April 2024	23 January 2025	Simon Harris	34th
28=	Hildegarde Naughton (born 1977)	Children, Disability and Equality	Disability	Fine Gael	23 January 2025	18 November 2025	Micheál Martin	35th
28=	Pippa Hackett (born 1974)	Agriculture, Food and the Marine	Land Use and Biodiversity	Green	27 June 2020	21 December 2022	Micheál Martin	32nd
28=	Pippa Hackett (born 1974)	Agriculture, Food and the Marine	Land Use and Biodiversity	Green	21 December 2022	23 January 2025	Leo Varadkar	33rd
28=	Pippa Hackett (born 1974)	Agriculture, Food and the Marine	Land Use and Biodiversity	Green	21 December 2022	23 January 2025	Simon Harris	34th
30=	Josepha Madigan (born 1970)	Education	Special Education and Inclusion	Fine Gael	1 July 2020	21 December 2022	Micheál Martin	32nd
30=	Josepha Madigan (born 1970)	Education	Special Education and Inclusion	Fine Gael	21 December 2022	22 March 2024	Leo Varadkar	33rd
30=	Anne Rabbitte (born 1973)	Health; Children, Equality, Disability, Integration and Youth	Disability	Fianna Fáil	1 July 2020	21 December 2022	Micheál Martin	32nd
30=	Anne Rabbitte (born 1973)	Health; Children, Equality, Disability, Integration and Youth	Disability	Fianna Fáil	21 December 2022	23 January 2025	Leo Varadkar	33rd
30=	Anne Rabbitte (born 1973)	Health; Children, Equality, Disability, Integration and Youth	Disability	Fianna Fáil	21 December 2022	23 January 2025	Simon Harris	34th
30=	Mary Butler (born 1973)	Health	Mental Health, Older People	Fianna Fáil	1 July 2020	21 December 2022	Micheál Martin	32nd
30=	Mary Butler (born 1973)	Health	Mental Health, Older People	Fianna Fáil	21 December 2022	23 January 2025	Leo Varadkar	33rd
30=	Mary Butler (born 1973)	Health	Mental Health, Older People	Fianna Fáil	21 December 2022	23 January 2025	Simon Harris	34th
30=	Mary Butler (born 1973)	Taoiseach	Government Chief Whip	Fianna Fáil	23 January 2025	Incumbent	Micheál Martin	35th
30=	Mary Butler (born 1973)	Health	Mental Health	Fianna Fáil	23 January 2025	Incumbent	Micheál Martin	35th
33	Jennifer Carroll MacNeill (born 1980)	Finance	Financial Services, Credit Unions and Insurance	Fine Gael	21 December 2022	10 April 2024	Leo Varadkar	33rd
33	Jennifer Carroll MacNeill (born 1980)	Foreign Affairs	European Affairs	Fine Gael	10 April 2024	23 January 2025	Simon Harris	34th
34	Emer Higgins (born 1985)	Enterprise, Trade and Employment	Employment Affairs and Retail Businesses	Fine Gael	10 April 2024	23 January 2025	Simon Harris	34th
34	Emer Higgins (born 1985)	Public Expenditure, Infrastructure, Public Service Reform and Digitalisation	Public procurement, digitalisation and eGovernment	Fine Gael	29 January 2025	18 November 2025	Micheál Martin	35th
34	Emer Higgins (born 1985)	Children, Disability and Equality	Disability	Fine Gael	18 November 2025	Incumbent	Micheál Martin	35th
35=	Jennifer Murnane O'Connor (born 1966)	Health	Public health, well-being and drugs	Fianna Fáil	29 January 2025	Incumbent	Micheál Martin	35th
35=	Niamh Smyth (born 1978)	Enterprise, Tourism and Employment	Trade promotion, artificial intelligence and digital transformation	Fianna Fáil	29 January 2025	Incumbent	Micheál Martin	35th
35=	Marian Harkin (born 1953)	Further and Higher Education, Research, Innovation and Science	Further education, apprenticeship, construction and climate skills	Independent	25 February 2025	Incumbent	Micheál Martin	35th
38	Catherine Ardagh (born 1982)	Justice, Home Affairs and Migration	International law, law reform and youth justice	Fianna Fáil	28 May 2026	Incumbent	Micheál Martin	35th

== Bibliography ==
- McNamara, Maedhbh; Mooney, Paschal (2000). Women in Parliament: Ireland 1918–2000. Dublin: Wolfhound Press. ISBN 0-86327-759-4.
- McNamara, Maedhbh (2020). A Woman's Place is in the Cabinet 1919–2019. Drogheda: Sea Dog Books. ISBN 978-1-913275-06-8.
