= Frank Feighan =

Irish politician (born 1962)

Frank Feighan TD
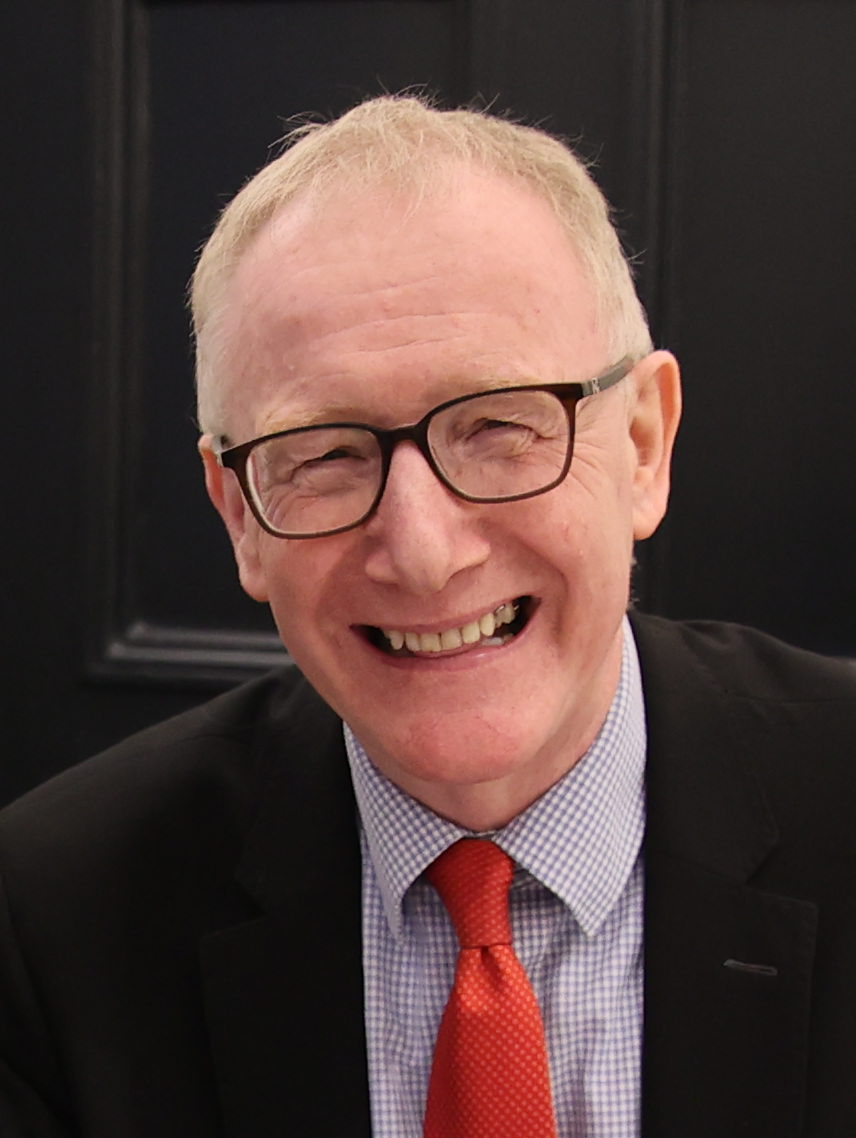
- Feighan in 2024

Minister of State
- 2025–: Public Expenditure, Infrastructure, Public Service Reform and Digitalisation
- 2020–2022: Health

Teachta Dála
- Incumbent
- Assumed office February 2020
- Constituency: Sligo–Leitrim
- In office May 2007 – February 2016
- Constituency: Roscommon–South Leitrim

Senator
- In office 8 June 2016 – 8 February 2020
- Constituency: Nominated by the Taoiseach
- In office 12 September 2002 – 24 May 2007
- Constituency: Administrative Panel

Personal details
- Born: 4 July 1962 (age 64) Sligo, Ireland
- Party: Fine Gael
- Spouse: Elaine Mooney (m. 2014)
- Children: 2
- Website: frankfeighan.ie

Frank Feighan (/ˈfiːən/; born 4 July 1962) is an Irish Fine Gael politician who has been a Teachta Dála (TD) for Sligo–Leitrim since the 2020 general election, and previously from 2007 to 2016 for Roscommon–South Leitrim. He has served as a Minister of State at the Department of Public Expenditure, Infrastructure, Public Service Reform and Digitalisation since November 2025, and previously as Minister of State at the Department of Health from July 2020 to December 2022. He served as a Senator for the Administrative Panel from 2002 to 2007 and from 2016 to 2020, after being nominated by the Taoiseach.

== Early and personal life ==
Feighan was born in Sligo in 1962, but is a native of Boyle, County Roscommon. He is married and has two children. He lives in Sligo with his family.

He took part in the RTÉ charity show, You're a Star in 2006 to raise funds for a children's charity.

In 2008, Feighan appeared on The Irish Times list of TDs with notable private portfolios. Ownership of multiple properties in addition to shares in mining companies, along with shares in financial institutions are listed.

== Political career ==
He was a member of Roscommon County Council from 1999 to 2004. Feighan was first elected to the Dáil at the 2007 general election. He was the party deputy Spokesperson on Transport and Education with special responsibility for Rural and School Transport from 2007 to 2010. In July 2010, he was appointed as party spokesperson on Community, Equality and Gaeltacht Affairs.

He was re-elected at the 2011 general election. In government he voted with Fine Gael on the Roscommon Hospital issue on 6 July 2011, when his constituency colleague Denis Naughten voted against them and lost the Fine Gael party whip. He told the Dáil he was "sincerely sorry" for breaking a pre-election promise in relation to the issue.

On 13 July 2015, he announced that he would not be contesting the 2016 general election.

Shortly before the United Kingdom voted to leave the European Union he expressed his wishes for the Republic of Ireland to rejoin the Commonwealth.

He was the Fine Gael Seanad Spokesperson on Mental Health and Older People.

In July 2020, following the formation of the 32nd Government of Ireland, Feighan was appointed as Minister of State at the Department of Health with responsibility for Public Health, Well Being and the National Drugs Strategy.

In May 2021, Feighan's proposal to introduce minimum unit pricing for alcohol in Ireland was approved by cabinet ministers. Under this legislation, a 10 cent per gram of alcohol minimum cost would be installed, with the minister citing that for example a 70cl bottle of vodka would now cost at a minimum €20.71.

A decision by the Department of Health on the suspension of the North Inner City Drugs Task Force in July 2021 was criticized by the group's director Professor Joe Barry. Feighan, as minister with responsibility for drugs strategy, defended the decision due to "governance shortcomings" in the group. Barry contested that the decision has been carried out to "remove every shred of independence from the task force by taking over the appointment of the chair and the appointment of members".

He was criticised in July 2022 after privately meeting with an anti-cannabis lobby group, known as the Cannabis Risk Alliance. Dr. Garrett McGovern said "If Frank Feighan was willing to meet with one group, he should have met another group who are pro-cannabis legalisation and against prohibition".

He was not re-appointed as a junior minister as part of the 33rd Government of Ireland in December 2022.

In March 2024, Feighan supported Simon Harris for the 2024 Fine Gael leadership election after the resignation of Leo Varadkar.

At the 2024 general election, Feighan was re-elected to the Dáil. In the November 2025 reshuffle following Paschal Donohoe's resignation, Feighan succeeded Emer Higgins as Minister of State at the Department of Public Expenditure, Infrastructure, Public Service Reform and Digitalisation with responsibility for public procurement, digitalisation and eGovernment.

Political offices
| Preceded by Catherine Byrne; Finian McGrath; Jim Daly | Minister of State at the Department of Health; 2020–2022; With: Mary Butler; Anne Rabbitte | Succeeded by Hildegarde Naughton |
| Preceded by Emer Higgins | Minister of State at the Department of Public Expenditure, Infrastructure, Public Service Reform and Digitalisation; 2025–present | Incumbent |

| Dáil | Election | Deputy (Party) | Deputy (Party) | Deputy (Party) |
|---|---|---|---|---|
| 30th | 2007 | Michael Finneran (FF) | Frank Feighan (FG) | Denis Naughten (FG) |
| 31st | 2011 | Luke 'Ming' Flanagan (Ind.) | Frank Feighan (FG) | Denis Naughten (FG) |
| 31st | 2014 by-election | Michael Fitzmaurice (Ind.) | Frank Feighan (FG) | Denis Naughten (FG) |
| 32nd | 2016 | Constituency abolished. See Roscommon–Galway and Sligo–Leitrim | | |

| Dáil | Election | Deputy (Party) | Deputy (Party) | Deputy (Party) | Deputy (Party) | Deputy (Party) |
|---|---|---|---|---|---|---|
| 13th | 1948 | Eugene Gilbride (FF) | Stephen Flynn (FF) | Bernard Maguire (Ind.) | Mary Reynolds (FG) | Joseph Roddy (FG) |
| 14th | 1951 | Eugene Gilbride (FF) | Stephen Flynn (FF) | Patrick Rogers (FG) | Mary Reynolds (FG) | Joseph Roddy (FG) |
| 15th | 1954 | Eugene Gilbride (FF) | Stephen Flynn (FF) | Bernard Maguire (Ind.) | Mary Reynolds (FG) | Joseph Roddy (FG) |
| 16th | 1957 | Eugene Gilbride (FF) | Stephen Flynn (FF) | John Joe McGirl (SF) | Mary Reynolds (FG) | Patrick Rogers (FG) |
| 16th | 1961 by-election | Eugene Gilbride (FF) | Joseph McLoughlin (FG) | John Joe McGirl (SF) | Mary Reynolds (FG) | Patrick Rogers (FG) |
| 17th | 1961 | Eugene Gilbride (FF) | Joseph McLoughlin (FG) | James Gallagher (FF) | Eugene Gilhawley (FG) | 4 seats 1961–1969 |
| 18th | 1965 | Eugene Gilbride (FF) | Joseph McLoughlin (FG) | James Gallagher (FF) | Eugene Gilhawley (FG) | 4 seats 1961–1969 |
| 19th | 1969 | Ray MacSharry (FF) | Joseph McLoughlin (FG) | James Gallagher (FF) | 3 seats 1969–1981 | |
| 20th | 1973 | Ray MacSharry (FF) | Joseph McLoughlin (FG) | Eugene Gilhawley (FG) | 3 seats 1969–1981 | |
| 21st | 1977 | Ray MacSharry (FF) | James Gallagher (FF) | Eugene Gilhawley (FG) | 3 seats 1969–1981 | |
| 22nd | 1981 | Ray MacSharry (FF) | John Ellis (FF) | Joe McCartin (FG) | Ted Nealon (FG) | 4 seats 1981–2007 |
| 23rd | 1982 (Feb) | Ray MacSharry (FF) | John Ellis (FF) | Matt Brennan (FF) | Ted Nealon (FG) | 4 seats 1981–2007 |
| 24th | 1982 (Nov) | Ray MacSharry (FF) | Joe McCartin (FG) | Matt Brennan (FF) | Ted Nealon (FG) | 4 seats 1981–2007 |
| 25th | 1987 | Ray MacSharry (FF) | John Ellis (FF) | Matt Brennan (FF) | Ted Nealon (FG) | 4 seats 1981–2007 |
| 26th | 1989 | Gerry Reynolds (FG) | John Ellis (FF) | Matt Brennan (FF) | Ted Nealon (FG) | 4 seats 1981–2007 |
| 27th | 1992 | Declan Bree (Lab) | John Ellis (FF) | Matt Brennan (FF) | Ted Nealon (FG) | 4 seats 1981–2007 |
| 28th | 1997 | Gerry Reynolds (FG) | John Ellis (FF) | Matt Brennan (FF) | John Perry (FG) | 4 seats 1981–2007 |
| 29th | 2002 | Marian Harkin (Ind.) | John Ellis (FF) | Jimmy Devins (FF) | John Perry (FG) | 4 seats 1981–2007 |
| 30th | 2007 | Constituency abolished. See Sligo–North Leitrim and Roscommon–South Leitrim | | | | |

| Dáil | Election | Deputy (Party) | Deputy (Party) | Deputy (Party) | Deputy (Party) |
|---|---|---|---|---|---|
| 32nd | 2016 | Martin Kenny (SF) | Marc MacSharry (FF) | Eamon Scanlon (FF) | Tony McLoughlin (FG) |
| 33rd | 2020 | Martin Kenny (SF) | Marc MacSharry (FF) | Marian Harkin (Ind.) | Frank Feighan (FG) |
| 34th | 2024 | Martin Kenny (SF) | Eamon Scanlon (FF) | Marian Harkin (Ind.) | Frank Feighan (FG) |
