= Minister of State for Disability =

List of Irish ministers of state for disability

The minister of state for disability is a junior ministerial post at the Department of Children, Disability and Equality of the Government of Ireland. The minister works together with the senior minister in the departments and has special responsibility for disability issues. The minister of state does not hold cabinet rank.

The first appointment of a minister of state with responsibility for disability was in 1997. The minister for health has often also had responsibility for other areas of equality and health.

As of January 2025, the office-holder is Hildegarde Naughton.

== List of office-holders ==
Name	Term of office		Party	Department(s)	Government
Mary Wallace	8 July 1997	6 June 2002	Fianna Fáil	Justice, Equality and Law Reform	25th
Willie O'Dea	19 June 2002	29 September 2004	Fianna Fáil	Justice, Equality and Law Reform	26th
Frank Fahey	29 September 2004	20 June 2007	Fianna Fáil	Justice, Equality and Law Reform	26th
Jimmy Devins	9 July 2007	7 May 2008	Fianna Fáil	Health and Children	27th
John Moloney	13 May 2008	9 March 2011	Fianna Fáil	Health and Children; Justice, Equality and Law Reform	28th
Kathleen Lynch	10 March 2011	6 May 2016	Labour	Health; Justice and Equality	29th
Finian McGrath	6 May 2016	27 June 2020	Independent	Health; Justice and Equality; Social Protection	30th • 31st
Anne Rabbitte	1 July 2020	23 January 2025	Fianna Fáil	Children, Equality, Disability, Integration and Youth; Health	32nd • 33rd • 34th
Hildegarde Naughton	23 January 2025	Incumbent	Fine Gael	Children, Disability and Equality	35th
