= Anne Rabbitte =

Irish politician (born 1973)

Senator Anne Rabbitte
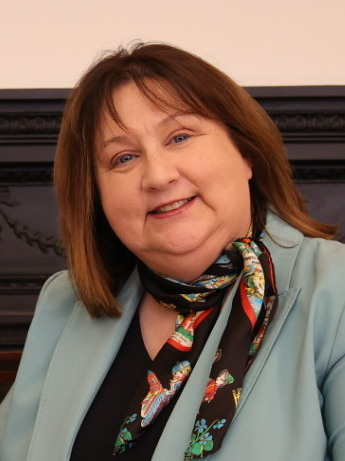
- Rabbitte in 2025

Senator
- Incumbent
- Assumed office 10 December 2024
- Constituency: Nominated by the Taoiseach

Minister of State
- 2020–2025: Children, Equality, Disability, Integration and Youth
- 2020–2024: Health

Teachta Dála
- In office February 2016 – November 2024
- Constituency: Galway East

Personal details
- Born: 11 October 1973 (age 53) Portumna, County Galway, Ireland
- Party: Fianna Fáil
- Spouse: Paddy Callan (m. 1997; died 2011)
- Children: 3
- Education: University College Dublin
- Website: annerabbitte.ie

Anne Rabbitte (born 11 October 1973) is an Irish Fianna Fáil politician who has served as a member of Seanad Éireann since December 2024. She was a Minister of State from July 2020 to January 2025. She previously served as a Teachta Dála (TD) for the Galway East constituency from 2016 to 2024.

She was a member of Galway County Council from 2014 for the Loughrea local electoral area until her election to the Dáil in 2016. In May 2016, she was appointed to the Fianna Fáil Front Bench, as Spokesperson for Children and Youth Affairs.

In April 2019, Rabbitte criticised plans to excavate the site of the former Bon Secours Mother and Baby Home in Tuam, describing it as "a wilful waste of public money", and questioned if the intention was to dig up every cillín (burial ground for stillborn and unbaptised infants) in Ireland.

In May 2019, Rabbitte contested the European Parliament election in Midlands–North-West but was unsuccessful.

Rabbitte was re-elected in Galway East at the 2020 general election. Following the formation of a new government of Fianna Fáil, Fine Gael and the Green Party, Rabbitte was appointed as a Minister of State on 1 July 2020. She was appointed as Minister of State at the Department of Children, Equality, Disability, Integration and Youth and Minister of State at the Department of Health with responsibility for Disability.

Rabbitte lost her seat at the 2024 general election. She was a nominated member to the 26th Seanad on 10 December 2024 by Taoiseach Simon Harris. She contested the 2025 Seanad election on the Labour Panel, but was not elected. She was a nominated member to the 27th Seanad on 7 February 2025.

Political offices
Preceded by Finian McGrath as Minister of State at the Department of Justice and Equality	Minister of State at the Department of Children, Equality, Disability, Integration and Youth; 2020–2025	Succeeded by Hildegarde Naughton as Minister of State at the Department of Children, Disability and Equality
Preceded by Catherine Byrne; Jim Daly; Finian McGrath	Minister of State at the Department of Health; 2020–2024; With: Mary Butler; Frank Feighan (2020–2022); Hildegarde Naughton (2022–2024)	Succeeded by Mary Butler; Colm Burke

Dáil	Election	Deputy (Party)	Deputy (Party)	Deputy (Party)	Deputy (Party)
9th	1937	Frank Fahy (FF)	Mark Killilea Snr (FF)	Patrick Beegan (FF)	Seán Broderick (FG)
10th	1938	Frank Fahy (FF)	Mark Killilea Snr (FF)	Patrick Beegan (FF)	Seán Broderick (FG)
11th	1943	Frank Fahy (FF)	Mark Killilea Snr (FF)	Patrick Beegan (FF)	Michael Donnellan (CnaT)
12th	1944	Frank Fahy (FF)	Mark Killilea Snr (FF)	Patrick Beegan (FF)	Michael Donnellan (CnaT)
13th	1948	Constituency abolished. See Galway North and Galway South			

Dáil	Election	Deputy (Party)	Deputy (Party)	Deputy (Party)	Deputy (Party)	Deputy (Party)
17th	1961	Michael F. Kitt (FF)	Anthony Millar (FF)	Michael Carty (FF)	Michael Donnellan (CnaT)	Brigid Hogan-O'Higgins (FG)
17th	1964 by-election	Michael F. Kitt (FF)	Anthony Millar (FF)	Michael Carty (FF)	John Donnellan (FG)	Brigid Hogan-O'Higgins (FG)
18th	1965	Michael F. Kitt (FF)	Anthony Millar (FF)	Michael Carty (FF)	John Donnellan (FG)	Brigid Hogan-O'Higgins (FG)
19th	1969	Constituency abolished. See Galway North-East and Clare–South Galway				

Dáil	Election	Deputy (Party)	Deputy (Party)	Deputy (Party)	Deputy (Party)
21st	1977	Johnny Callanan (FF)	Thomas Hussey (FF)	Mark Killilea Jnr (FF)	John Donnellan (FG)
22nd	1981	Johnny Callanan (FF)	Michael P. Kitt (FF)	Paul Connaughton Snr (FG)	3 seats 1981–1997
23rd	1982 (Feb)	Johnny Callanan (FF)	Michael P. Kitt (FF)	Paul Connaughton Snr (FG)	3 seats 1981–1997
23rd	1982 by-election	Noel Treacy (FF)	Michael P. Kitt (FF)	Paul Connaughton Snr (FG)	3 seats 1981–1997
24th	1982 (Nov)	Noel Treacy (FF)	Michael P. Kitt (FF)	Paul Connaughton Snr (FG)	3 seats 1981–1997
25th	1987	Noel Treacy (FF)	Michael P. Kitt (FF)	Paul Connaughton Snr (FG)	3 seats 1981–1997
26th	1989	Noel Treacy (FF)	Michael P. Kitt (FF)	Paul Connaughton Snr (FG)	3 seats 1981–1997
27th	1992	Noel Treacy (FF)	Michael P. Kitt (FF)	Paul Connaughton Snr (FG)	3 seats 1981–1997
28th	1997	Noel Treacy (FF)	Michael P. Kitt (FF)	Paul Connaughton Snr (FG)	Ulick Burke (FG)
29th	2002	Noel Treacy (FF)	Joe Callanan (FF)	Paul Connaughton Snr (FG)	Paddy McHugh (Ind.)
30th	2007	Noel Treacy (FF)	Michael P. Kitt (FF)	Paul Connaughton Snr (FG)	Ulick Burke (FG)
31st	2011	Colm Keaveney (Lab)	Michael P. Kitt (FF)	Ciarán Cannon (FG)	Paul Connaughton Jnr (FG)
32nd	2016	Seán Canney (Ind.)	Anne Rabbitte (FF)	Ciarán Cannon (FG)	3 seats 2016–2024
33rd	2020	Seán Canney (Ind.)	Anne Rabbitte (FF)	Ciarán Cannon (FG)	3 seats 2016–2024
34th	2024	Seán Canney (Ind.)	Albert Dolan (FF)	Peter Roche (FG)	Louis O'Hara (SF)
