= Government of the 29th Dáil =

Government of Ireland 2002 to 2007

26th government of Ireland
- Government of Ireland

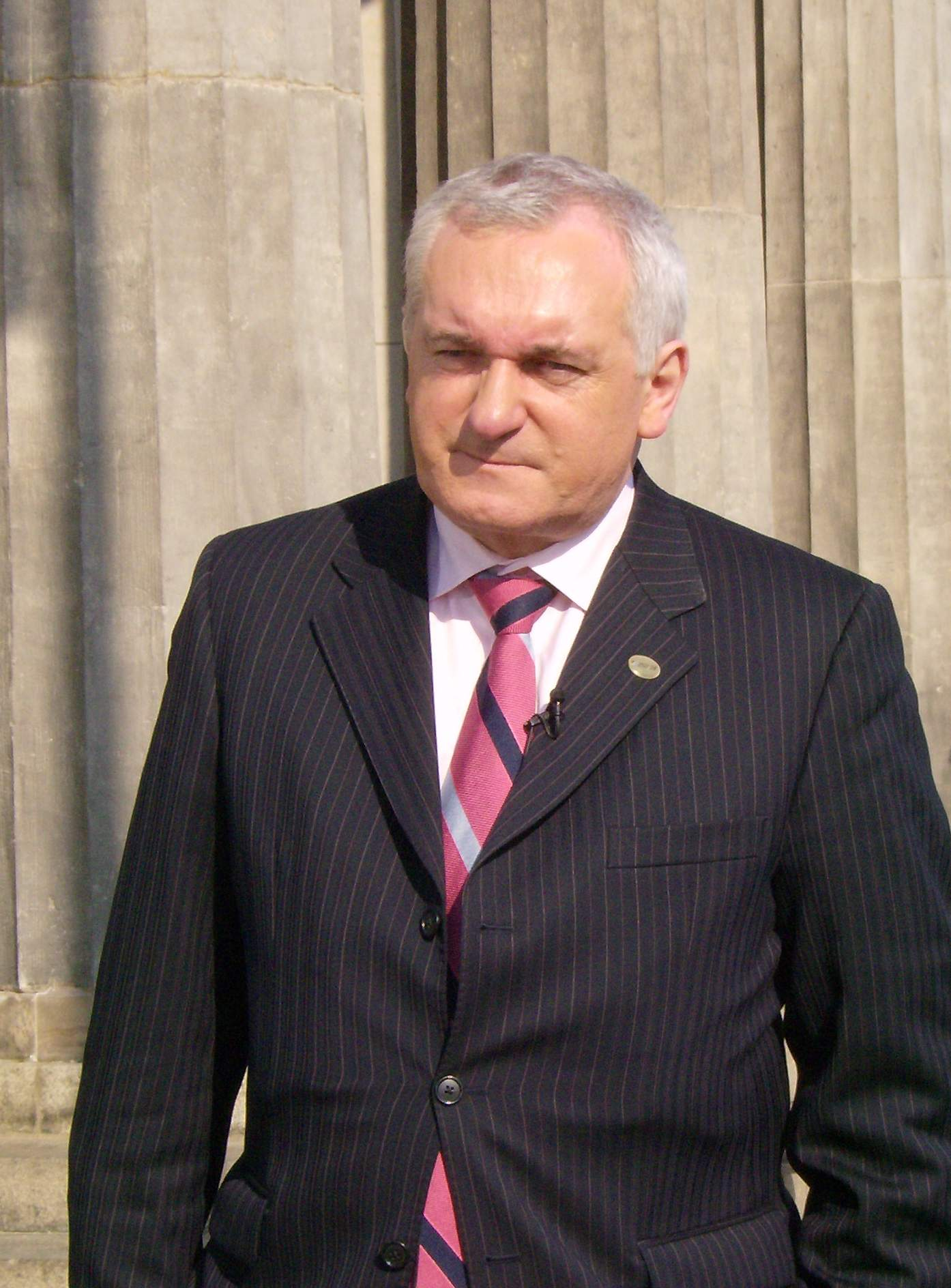
- Date formed: 6 June 2002
- Date dissolved: 14 June 2007

People and organisations
- President: Mary McAleese
- Taoiseach: Bertie Ahern
- Tánaiste: Mary Harney (2002–2006); Michael McDowell (2006–2007)
- Total no. of members: 15
- Member parties: Fianna Fáil; Progressive Democrats
- Status in legislature: Coalition
- Opposition party: Fine Gael
- Opposition leader: Enda Kenny

History
- Election: 2002 general election
- Legislature terms: 29th Dáil; 22nd Seanad
- Predecessor: 25th government
- Successor: 27th government

The 26th government of Ireland (6 June 2002 – 14 June 2007) was the government of Ireland formed after the 2002 general election to the 29th Dáil which had been held on 17 May 2002. It was led by Fianna Fáil leader Bertie Ahern as Taoiseach, with Progressive Democrats leader Mary Harney as Tánaiste. It was the first, and to date only, coalition government to be returned to government after an election; both parties increased their number of seats, and together secured a Dáil majority, where in the previous government they had governed together as a minority government dependent on the support of Independent TDs. It lasted for 5 years, 8 days.

== Nomination of Taoiseach ==
The 29th Dáil first met on 6 June 2002. In the debate on the nomination of Taoisech, outgoing Taoiseach and Fianna Fáil leader Bertie Ahern, Fine Gael leader Enda Kenny, Labour Party leader Ruairi Quinn, and Green Party leader Trevor Sargent were each proposed. Ahern received the nomination of the Dáil. Ahern was re-appointed as Taoiseach by President Mary McAleese.

6 June 2002; Nomination of Bertie Ahern (FF) as Taoiseach; Motion proposed by Charlie McCreevy and seconded by Mary Harney; Absolute majority: 84/166
Vote	Parties	Votes
Yes	Fianna Fáil (80), Progressive Democrats (8), Independent (5)	93 / 166
No	Fine Gael (31), Labour Party (21), Green Party (6), Sinn Féin (5), Independent (4), Socialist Party (1)	68 / 166
Not voting	Independent (4), Ceann Comhairle (1)	5 / 166

== Government ministers ==
After his appointment as Taoiseach by the president, Bertie Ahern proposed the members of the government and they were approved by the Dáil. They were appointed by the president on the same day.

Office	Name	Term	Party
Taoiseach	Bertie Ahern	2002–2007	Fianna Fáil
Tánaiste	Mary Harney	2002–2006	Progressive Democrats
Minister for Enterprise, Trade and Employment	Mary Harney	2002–2004	Progressive Democrats
Minister for Finance	Charlie McCreevy	2002–2004	Fianna Fáil
Minister for Defence	Michael Smith	2002–2004	Fianna Fáil
Minister for Agriculture and Food (Note: The Department of Agriculture, Food and Rural Development was renamed the Department of Agriculture and Food on 19 June 2002.)	Joe Walsh	2002–2004	Fianna Fáil
Minister for Foreign Affairs	Brian Cowen	2002–2004	Fianna Fáil
Minister for Education and Science	Noel Dempsey	2002–2004	Fianna Fáil
Minister for Communications, Marine and Natural Resources (Note: The Department of Marine and Natural Resources was renamed the Department of Communications, Marine and Natural Resources on 19 June 2002.)	Dermot Ahern	2002–2004	Fianna Fáil
Minister for Arts, Sport and Tourism (Note: The Department of Tourism, Sport and Recreation was renamed the Department of Arts, Sport and Tourism on 19 June 2002.)	John O'Donoghue	2002–2007	Fianna Fáil
Minister for Health and Children	Micheál Martin	2002–2004	Fianna Fáil
Minister for Transport (Note: The Department of Public Enterprise was renamed the Department of Transport on 19 June 2002.)	Séamus Brennan	2002–2004	Fianna Fáil
Minister for Justice, Equality and Law Reform	Michael McDowell	2002–2007	Progressive Democrats
Minister for the Environment, Heritage and Local Government (Note: The Department of Environment and Local Government was renamed the Department of Environment, Heritage and Local Government on 10 June 2003.)	Martin Cullen	2002–2004	Fianna Fáil
Minister for Community, Rural and Gaeltacht Affairs (Note: The Department of Arts, Heritage, Gaeltacht and the Islands was renamed the Department of Community, Rural and Gaeltacht Affairs on 19 June 2002.)	Éamon Ó Cuív	2002–2007	Fianna Fáil
Minister for Social and Family Affairs (Note: The Department of Social, Community and Family Affairs was renamed the Department of Social and Family Affairs on 19 June 2002.)	Mary Coughlan	2002–2004	Fianna Fáil
=== Changes 29 September 2004 === Following the resignation of Charlie McCreevy on his nomination as European Commissioner and of Michael Smith and Joe Walsh.
Office	Name	Term	Party
Minister for Health and Children	Mary Harney	2004–2007	Progressive Democrats
Minister for Finance	Brian Cowen	2004–2007	Fianna Fáil
Minister for Communications, Marine and Natural Resources	Noel Dempsey	2004–2007	Fianna Fáil
Minister for Foreign Affairs	Dermot Ahern	2004–2007	Fianna Fáil
Minister for Enterprise, Trade and Employment	Micheál Martin	2004–2007	Fianna Fáil
Minister for Social and Family Affairs	Séamus Brennan	2004–2007	Fianna Fáil
Minister for Transport	Martin Cullen	2004–2007	Fianna Fáil
Minister for Agriculture and Food	Mary Coughlan	2004–2007	Fianna Fáil
Minister for Education and Science	Mary Hanafin	2004–2007	Fianna Fáil
Minister for Defence	Willie O'Dea	2004–2007	Fianna Fáil
Minister for the Environment, Heritage and Local Government	Dick Roche	2004–2007	Fianna Fáil
=== Changes 13 September 2006 === Following the resignation of Mary Harney as leader of the Progressive Democrats and the election of Michael McDowell.
Office	Name	Term	Party
Tánaiste	Michael McDowell	2006–2007	Progressive Democrats

Changes to departments

== Attorney General ==
Rory Brady SC was appointed by the president as Attorney General on the nomination of the Taoiseach.

== Ministers of state ==
On 6 June 2002, the government on the nomination of the Taoiseach appointed Mary Hanafin to the post of Minister for State at the Department of the Taoiseach with special responsibility as Government Chief Whip and Dick Roche, the position of Minister of State at the Department of the Taoiseach and the Department of Foreign Affairs, with special responsibility for European Affairs. On 18 June, the Taoiseach announced that the government had appointed with effect from 19 June the other 15 Ministers of State and that the government had also appointed Mary Hanafin to be Minister of State at the Department of Defence.

Name	Department(s)	Responsibility	Party
Mary Hanafin (In attendance at cabinet)	Taoiseach; Defence	Government Chief Whip; Defence; Information society	Fianna Fáil
Dick Roche	Taoiseach; Foreign Affairs	European Affairs	Fianna Fáil
Brian Lenihan	Health and Children; Justice, Equality and Law Reform; Education and Science	Children	Fianna Fáil
Tom Kitt	Foreign Affairs	Overseas Development and Human Rights	Fianna Fáil
Síle de Valera	Education and Science	Adult Education, Youth Affairs and Educational Disadvantage	Fianna Fáil
Jim McDaid	Transport	Road Traffic and Road Haulage	Fianna Fáil
Frank Fahey	Enterprise, Trade and Employment	Labour Affairs	Fianna Fáil
Noel Treacy	Agriculture and Food	Food and Horticulture	Fianna Fáil
Willie O'Dea	Justice, Equality and Law Reform	Equality and Disability Issues	Fianna Fáil
Pat "the Cope" Gallagher	Environment, Heritage and Local Government	Environmental Protection	Fianna Fáil
Liam Aylward	Agriculture and Food	Animal Health and Welfare; and Customer Service	Fianna Fáil
John Browne	Communications, Marine and Natural Resources	Marine	Fianna Fáil
Michael Ahern	Enterprise, Trade and Employment	Trade and Commerce	Fianna Fáil
Ivor Callely	Health and Children	Older People	Fianna Fáil
Noel Ahern	Environment, Heritage and Local Government; Community, Rural and Gaeltacht Affairs	Housing and Urban Renewal; Drugs Strategy and Community Affairs	Fianna Fáil
Tim O'Malley	Health and Children	Mental Health Services and Food Safety	Progressive Democrats
Tom Parlon	Finance	Office of Public Works	Progressive Democrats
=== Changes 29 September 2004 === Following the election to the European Parliament of Liam Aylward and the appointment to government of Mary Hanafin, Dick Roche and Willie O'Dea.
Name	Department(s)	Responsibility	Party
Tom Kitt	Taoiseach; Defence	Government Chief Whip	Fianna Fáil
Frank Fahey	Justice, Equality and Law Reform	Equality and Disability Issues	Fianna Fáil
Noel Treacy	Taoiseach; Foreign Affairs	European Affairs	Fianna Fáil
Pat "the Cope" Gallagher	Communications, Marine and Natural Resources	Marine	Fianna Fáil
John Browne	Agriculture and Food	Forestry	Fianna Fáil
Ivor Callely	Transport	Traffic Management, Road Haulage and the Irish Aviation Authority	Fianna Fáil
Seán Power	Health and Children	Health Promotion	Fianna Fáil
Batt O'Keeffe	Environment, Heritage and Local Government	Environmental Protection	Fianna Fáil
Tony Killeen	Enterprise, Trade and Employment	Labour Affairs	Fianna Fáil
Brendan Smith	Agriculture and Food	Food and Horticulture	Fianna Fáil
=== Changes 5 October 2004 === Following the resignation of Jim McDaid.
Conor Lenihan	Foreign Affairs	Overseas Development and Human Rights	Fianna Fáil
=== Change 7 December 2005 === Redesignation of role.
Brian Lenihan (In attendance at cabinet)	Health and Children; Justice, Equality and Law Reform; Education and Science	Office of the Minister for Children	Fianna Fáil
=== Changes 14 February 2006 === Following the resignation of Ivor Callely on 8 December 2005.
Name	Department(s)	Responsibility	Party
Mary Wallace	Agriculture and Food	Forestry	Fianna Fáil
John Browne	Communications, Marine and Natural Resources	Marine	Fianna Fáil
Pat "the Cope" Gallagher	Transport	Traffic Management, Road Haulage and the Irish Aviation Authority	Fianna Fáil
=== Changes 12 December 2006 === Following the resignation of Síle de Valera on 8 December 2006.
Name	Department(s)	Responsibility	Party
Seán Haughey	Education and Science	Adult Education, Youth Affairs and Educational Disadvantage	Fianna Fáil

== Dissolution ==
On 29 April 2007, the president dissolved the Dáil on the advice of the Taoiseach, and a general election was held on 24 May. The 30th Dáil met on 14 June and Bertie Ahern was re-appointed as Taoiseach and formed a new government.
