= Minister of State at the Department of Health =

List of Irish ministers of state

The minister of state at the Department of Health is a junior ministerial post in the Department of Health of the Government of Ireland who may perform functions delegated by the minister for health. A minister of state does not hold cabinet rank.

As of January 2025, there are three ministers of state:

- Mary Butler, TD – Minister of State with responsibility for mental health. Butler is also Government Chief Whip;
- Jennifer Murnane O'Connor, TD – Minister of State with responsibility for public health, well-being and drugs; and
- Kieran O'Donnell, TD – Minister of State with responsibility for older people.

== List of parliamentary secretaries ==
Name	Term of office		Party	Government
Richard Barry	14 March 1973	5 July 1977	Fine Gael	14th

== List of ministers of state ==
=== Department of Health 1980–1997 ===
Name	Term of office		Party	Responsibilities	Government
Tom Nolan	25 March 1980	17 December 1980	Fianna Fáil		16th
Thomas Hussey	17 December 1980	30 June 1981	Fianna Fáil		16th
Donal Creed	30 June 1981	11 November 1981	Fine Gael		17th
Mary Flaherty	30 June 1981	9 March 1982	Fine Gael	Poverty and the Family	17th
Gerry L'Estrange	11 November 1981	9 March 1982	Fine Gael		17th
Fergus O'Brien	16 December 1982	15 December 1983	Fine Gael	Public Health	19th
John Donnellan	15 December 1983	10 March 1987	Fine Gael	Public Health	19th
Terry Leyden	12 March 1987	12 July 1989	Fianna Fáil		20th
Noel Treacy	19 July 1989	6 February 1991	Fianna Fáil		21st
Chris Flood	6 February 1991	13 February 1992	Fianna Fáil		21st
Chris Flood	13 February 1992	12 January 1993	Fianna Fáil		22nd
Willie O'Dea	14 January 1993	15 December 1994	Fianna Fáil		23rd
Brian O'Shea	20 December 1994	26 June 1997	Labour	Mental handicap, health promotion, food safety and public health	24th
Austin Currie	20 December 1994	26 June 1997	Fine Gael		24th
=== Department of Health and Children 1997–2011 ===
Name	Term of office		Party	Responsibilities	Government
Frank Fahey	8 July 1997	1 February 2000	Fianna Fáil	Children	25th
Tom Moffatt	8 July 1997	6 June 2002	Fianna Fáil	Food safety and Older people	25th
Mary Hanafin	1 February 2000	6 June 2002	Fianna Fáil	Children	25th
Ivor Callely	18 June 2002	29 September 2004	Fianna Fáil	Older People	26th
Brian Lenihan	18 June 2002	14 June 2007	Fianna Fáil	Children	26th
Tim O'Malley	18 June 2002	14 June 2007	Progressive Democrats	Mental Health Services and Food Safety	26th
Seán Power	29 September 2004	14 June 2007	Fianna Fáil	Health Promotion	26th
Brendan Smith	20 June 2007	7 May 2008	Fianna Fáil	Children	27th
Pat "the Cope" Gallagher	20 June 2007	7 May 2008	Fianna Fáil	Health Promotion and Food Safety	27th
Jimmy Devins	9 July 2007	7 May 2008	Fianna Fáil	Disability issues and mental health	27th
Máire Hoctor	9 July 2007	7 May 2008	Fianna Fáil	Older People	27th
Barry Andrews	7 May 2008	9 March 2011	Fianna Fáil	Children and Youth Affairs	28th
John Moloney	13 May 2008	23 March 2010	Fianna Fáil	Equality, Disability Issues and Mental Health	28th
John Moloney	23 March 2010	9 March 2011	Fianna Fáil	Disability Issues and Mental Health	28th
Máire Hoctor	13 May 2008	22 April 2009	Fianna Fáil	Older People	28th
Mary Wallace	13 May 2008	22 April 2009	Fianna Fáil	Health Promotion and Food Safety	28th
Trevor Sargent	22 April 2009	23 February 2010	Green	Food Safety	28th
Áine Brady	22 April 2009	9 March 2011	Fianna Fáil	Older People and Health Promotion	28th
=== Department of Health 2011–present ===
Name	Term of office		Party	Responsibilities	Government
Róisín Shortall	10 March 2011	26 September 2012	Labour	Primary Care	29th
Kathleen Lynch	10 March 2011	15 July 2014	Labour	Disability, Equality and Mental Health	29th
Kathleen Lynch	15 July 2014	6 May 2016	Labour	Primary Care, Mental Health and Disability	29th
Alex White	2 October 2012	11 July 2014	Labour	Primary Care	29th
Aodhán Ó Ríordáin	22 April 2015	6 May 2016	Labour	Drugs strategy	29th
Finian McGrath	6 May 2016	14 June 2017	Independent	Disability Issues	30th
Helen McEntee	19 May 2016	14 June 2017	Fine Gael	Mental Health and Older People	30th
Marcella Corcoran Kennedy	19 May 2016	14 June 2017	Fine Gael	Health Promotion	30th
Catherine Byrne	19 May 2016	14 June 2017	Fine Gael	Communities and the National Drugs Strategy	30th
Finian McGrath	14 June 2017	27 June 2020	Independent	Disability Issues	31st
Jim Daly	20 June 2017	27 June 2020	Fine Gael	Mental Health and Older People	31st
Catherine Byrne	20 June 2017	27 June 2020	Fine Gael	Health Promotion and National Drugs Strategy	31st
Frank Feighan	1 July 2020	17 December 2022	Fine Gael	Public Health, Well Being, National Drugs Strategy	32nd
Mary Butler	1 July 2020	23 January 2025	Fianna Fáil	Mental Health and Older People	32nd • 33rd • 34th • 35th
Anne Rabbitte	1 July 2020	9 April 2024	Fianna Fáil	Disability	32nd • 33rd
Hildegarde Naughton	21 December 2022	9 April 2024	Fine Gael	Public Health, Well Being, National Drugs Strategy	33rd
Colm Burke	10 April 2024	23 January 2025	Fine Gael	Public Health, Wellbeing and the National Drugs Strategy	34th
Mary Butler	23 January 2025	Incumbent	Fianna Fáil	Mental Health	35th
Jennifer Murnane O'Connor	29 January 2025	Incumbent	Fianna Fáil	Public health, well-being and drugs	35th
Kieran O'Donnell	29 January 2025	Incumbent	Fine Gael	Older people	35th
