= Jimmy Devins =

Irish former politician (born 1948)

Minister of State
- 2007–2009: Enterprise, Trade and Employment
- 2007–2009: Education and Science
- 2007–2008: Justice, Equality and Law Reform
- 2007–2008: Health and Children

Teachta Dála
- In office May 2007 – February 2011
- Constituency: Sligo–North Leitrim
- In office May 2002 – May 2007
- Constituency: Sligo–Leitrim

Personal details
- Born: 20 September 1948 (age 78) Sligo, Ireland
- Party: Fianna Fáil
- Spouse: Mary Devins (m. 1975)
- Relatives: James Devins (grandfather)
- Education: University College Dublin; Trinity College Dublin

James Devins (born 20 September 1948) is an Irish former Fianna Fáil politician who served as a Minister of State in various government departments from 2007 to 2009.

He served as a Teachta Dála (TD) from 2002 to 2011. Devins is a medical doctor by profession, and worked as a GP in Sligo from 1975.

== Political career ==
Devins was elected to Sligo County Council in 1991 and re-elected in 1999. He was first elected to Dáil Éireann at the 2002 general election as a Fianna Fáil TD for the Sligo–Leitrim constituency. At the 2007 general election, he was elected for the Sligo–North Leitrim constituency.

In July 2007, legislation was passed to increase the number of Ministers of State from 17 to 20, and Devins was nominated by Taoiseach Bertie Ahern to be appointed by the government to be Minister of State at the Departments of Health and Children, Education and Science, Enterprise, Trade and Employment and Justice, Equality and Law Reform, with special responsibility for disability issues and mental health, and excluding discrimination.

In May 2008, Brian Cowen succeeded Ahern as Taoiseach, and nominated Devins to be appointed by the government to be Minister of State at the Departments of Enterprise, Trade and Employment, and Education and Science, with special responsibility for science, technology and innovation. In April 2009, Cowen sought the resignation of all Ministers of State in order to reduce the number from 20 to 15. Devins was not one of those reappointed.

On 5 August 2009, Devins (along with fellow Fianna Fáil TD Eamon Scanlon) resigned the party whip over his opposition to cuts in services at Sligo General Hospital. He stated that he would remain a member of the Fianna Fáil party. He rejoined the Fianna Fáil parliamentary party on 25 January 2011, a day before the leadership election.

Devins did not contest the 2011 general election.

== Personal life ==
His grandfather, James Devins, served a Sinn Féin TD for Sligo–Mayo East from 1921 to 1922. He is married to Judge Mary Devins.

== See also ==
- Families in the Oireachtas

Political offices
Preceded by Brian Lenihan; Seán Power	Minister of State at the Department of Health; 2007–2008; With: Brendan Smith; Pat "the Cope" Gallagher; Máire Hoctor	Succeeded by Barry Andrews; Máire Hoctor; John Moloney; Mary Wallace
Preceded by Michael Ahern; Tony Killeen	Minister of State at the Department of Enterprise, Trade and Employment; 2007–2009; With: Michael Ahern (2007–2008); Billy Kelleher; John McGuinness; John Moloney (2008–2009)	Succeeded by Conor Lenihan; Dara Calleary

Dáil	Election	Deputy (Party)	Deputy (Party)	Deputy (Party)	Deputy (Party)	Deputy (Party)
13th	1948	Eugene Gilbride (FF)	Stephen Flynn (FF)	Bernard Maguire (Ind.)	Mary Reynolds (FG)	Joseph Roddy (FG)
14th	1951	Eugene Gilbride (FF)	Stephen Flynn (FF)	Patrick Rogers (FG)	Mary Reynolds (FG)	Joseph Roddy (FG)
15th	1954	Eugene Gilbride (FF)	Stephen Flynn (FF)	Bernard Maguire (Ind.)	Mary Reynolds (FG)	Joseph Roddy (FG)
16th	1957	Eugene Gilbride (FF)	Stephen Flynn (FF)	John Joe McGirl (SF)	Mary Reynolds (FG)	Patrick Rogers (FG)
16th	1961 by-election	Eugene Gilbride (FF)	Joseph McLoughlin (FG)	John Joe McGirl (SF)	Mary Reynolds (FG)	Patrick Rogers (FG)
17th	1961	Eugene Gilbride (FF)	Joseph McLoughlin (FG)	James Gallagher (FF)	Eugene Gilhawley (FG)	4 seats 1961–1969
18th	1965	Eugene Gilbride (FF)	Joseph McLoughlin (FG)	James Gallagher (FF)	Eugene Gilhawley (FG)	4 seats 1961–1969
19th	1969	Ray MacSharry (FF)	Joseph McLoughlin (FG)	James Gallagher (FF)	3 seats 1969–1981	
20th	1973	Ray MacSharry (FF)	Joseph McLoughlin (FG)	Eugene Gilhawley (FG)	3 seats 1969–1981	
21st	1977	Ray MacSharry (FF)	James Gallagher (FF)	Eugene Gilhawley (FG)	3 seats 1969–1981	
22nd	1981	Ray MacSharry (FF)	John Ellis (FF)	Joe McCartin (FG)	Ted Nealon (FG)	4 seats 1981–2007
23rd	1982 (Feb)	Ray MacSharry (FF)	John Ellis (FF)	Matt Brennan (FF)	Ted Nealon (FG)	4 seats 1981–2007
24th	1982 (Nov)	Ray MacSharry (FF)	Joe McCartin (FG)	Matt Brennan (FF)	Ted Nealon (FG)	4 seats 1981–2007
25th	1987	Ray MacSharry (FF)	John Ellis (FF)	Matt Brennan (FF)	Ted Nealon (FG)	4 seats 1981–2007
26th	1989	Gerry Reynolds (FG)	John Ellis (FF)	Matt Brennan (FF)	Ted Nealon (FG)	4 seats 1981–2007
27th	1992	Declan Bree (Lab)	John Ellis (FF)	Matt Brennan (FF)	Ted Nealon (FG)	4 seats 1981–2007
28th	1997	Gerry Reynolds (FG)	John Ellis (FF)	Matt Brennan (FF)	John Perry (FG)	4 seats 1981–2007
29th	2002	Marian Harkin (Ind.)	John Ellis (FF)	Jimmy Devins (FF)	John Perry (FG)	4 seats 1981–2007
30th	2007	Constituency abolished. See Sligo–North Leitrim and Roscommon–South Leitrim				

Dáil	Election	Deputy (Party)	Deputy (Party)	Deputy (Party)	Deputy (Party)
32nd	2016	Martin Kenny (SF)	Marc MacSharry (FF)	Eamon Scanlon (FF)	Tony McLoughlin (FG)
33rd	2020	Martin Kenny (SF)	Marc MacSharry (FF)	Marian Harkin (Ind.)	Frank Feighan (FG)
34th	2024	Martin Kenny (SF)	Eamon Scanlon (FF)	Marian Harkin (Ind.)	Frank Feighan (FG)

Dáil	Election	Deputy (Party)	Deputy (Party)	Deputy (Party)
30th	2007	Jimmy Devins (FF)	Eamon Scanlon (FF)	John Perry (FG)
31st	2011	Michael Colreavy (SF)	Tony McLoughlin (FG)	John Perry (FG)
32nd	2016	Constituency abolished. See Sligo–Leitrim		
