= Willie O'Dea =

Irish politician (born 1952)

Willie O'Dea TD
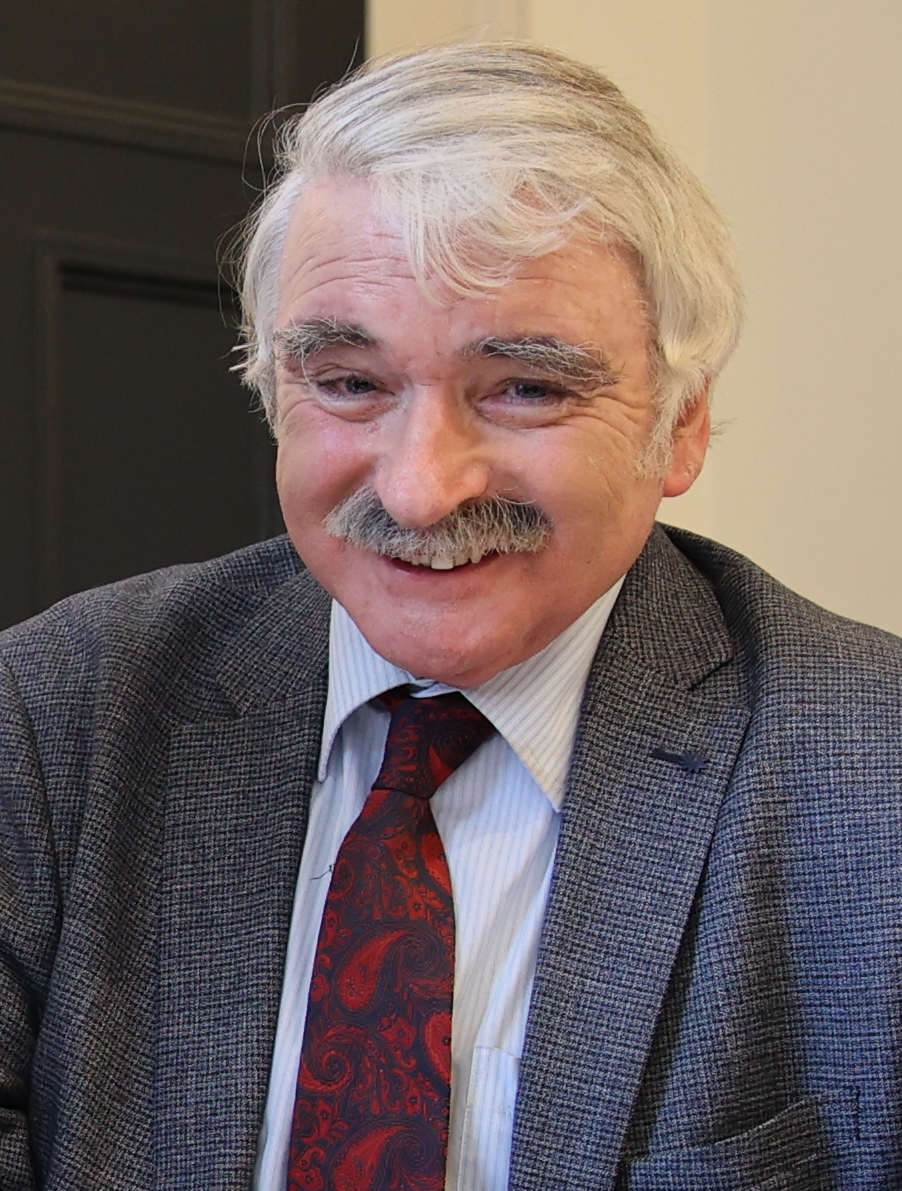
- O'Dea in 2024

Teachta Dála
- Incumbent
- Assumed office February 2011
- Constituency: Limerick City
- In office February 1982 – February 2011
- Constituency: Limerick East

Minister for Defence
- In office 29 September 2004 – 18 February 2010
- Taoiseach: Bertie Ahern; Brian Cowen
- Preceded by: Michael Smith
- Succeeded by: Brian Cowen

Minister of State
- 2002–2004: Justice, Equality and Law Reform
- 1997–2002: Education and Science
- 1993–1994: Health
- 1992–1994: Justice

Personal details
- Born: William Gerard O'Dea; 1 November 1952 (age 73) Limerick, Ireland
- Party: Fianna Fáil
- Spouse: Geraldine Kennedy (m. 1990)
- Education: University College Dublin; King's Inns
- Website: willieodea.ie

William Gerard O'Dea (/ˈdi/ DEE; born 1 November 1952) is an Irish Fianna Fáil politician who has been a Teachta Dála (TD) for the Limerick City constituency since 2011, and previously from 1982 to 2011 for the Limerick East constituency. He has served as Minister for Defence from 2004 to 2010, and was a Minister of State in different departments from 1992 to 1994, and again from 1997 to 2004.

== Early and private life ==
O'Dea was born in Limerick in 1952, but he was raised in Kilteely, County Limerick. He was educated at the Patrician Brothers College in Ballyfin, County Laois, and University College Dublin where he studied law. He qualified as a barrister at King's Inns, Dublin and as an accountant from the Institute of Certified Accountants. He worked as both a barrister and as an accountant before embarking on a career in politics. He also lectured in the law faculties of both University College Dublin and the National Institute of Higher Education, Limerick (now the University of Limerick). As a lecturer, he taught future cabinet colleague and Taoiseach Brian Cowen.

O'Dea is married to Geraldine Kennedy. He writes regularly for the Sunday Independent and occasionally for other national newspapers.

== Early political career ==
O'Dea first held political office as a Fianna Fáil member of Limerick County Council. He served on that authority until 1992. He first stood for election to Dáil Éireann in Limerick East at the 1981 general election, but was unsuccessful. He was elected to the Dáil on his second attempt at the February 1982 general election, capturing Fianna Fáil's second seat.

Like his former constituency colleague Desmond O'Malley, O'Dea was opposed to Charles Haughey's leadership throughout the 1980s, becoming a member of the so-called Gang of 22. When O'Malley founded Progressive Democrats in 1985 and left Fianna Fáil, O'Dea became the only Fianna Fáil TD in the five-seat Limerick East constituency.

== Ministerial career ==
In January 1992, after Albert Reynolds succeeded Charles Haughey as leader of Fianna Fáil and Taoiseach in coalition with the Progressive Democrats. O'Dea was appointed as a Minister of State at the Department of Justice. In January 1993, in the Fianna Fáil–Labour Party coalition government, O'Dea was reappointed at Justice with the additional appointment as Minister of State at the Department of Health. He held these positions until December 1994, when the government collapsed.

After the 1997 general election, Fianna Fáil were back in government in coalition with the Progressive Democrats and O'Dea was appointed a Minister of State at the Department of Education and Science. Here he had responsibility for Adult Education and the School Transport Scheme. He oversaw reform and increased investment in adult education and back to school initiatives, starting with the launch of Green Paper in November 1998.

Following the 2002 general election, O'Dea was appointed Minister of State at the Department of Justice, Equality and Law Reform with special responsibility for Equality and Disability Issues. His main responsibility during this period was the passage of the Disabilities Bill, which the government had been forced to withdraw in early 2002 in the teeth of opposition from the disability sector. After a number of changes, including a form of the independent assessment of needs demanded by the disability organisations, O'Dea introduced a new bill in September 2004 along with an implementation package.

In September 2004, O'Dea was appointed Minister for Defence in a cabinet reshuffle. His tenure commenced as the army deafness compensation issue was starting to come to an end.

In November 2005, O'Dea was photographed during a media event at the Curragh Camp pointing an automatic pistol at a photographer. The photo appeared on the front page of The Irish Times the following day. O'Dea apologised saying that it was not his intention to glamorise gun crime.

As Minister for Defence, O'Dea prioritised two particular issues: the recruitment of more women to the Defence Forces and the promotion of more serving non-commissioned members to the commissioned ranks, often called "promotion from the ranks".

He also presided over Ireland's second tour in Lebanon in late 2006, as part of UNIFIL 2 and participation in the EUFOR mission to Chad.

== O'Dea and Limerick ==
O'Dea is highly identified with his native Limerick. Three main issues have dominated his recent pronouncements on Limerick: Shannon Airport, Dell and gangland crime.

In August 2007, he broke ranks with cabinet colleagues to speak out against Aer Lingus's decision to cease London Heathrow Airport flights from Shannon.

In December 2008, O'Dea and Tánaiste Mary Coughlan flew to Dell's Corporate HQ in Texas, in a last-ditch and ultimately futile attempt to stop the closure of Dell's manufacturing plant in Raheen, Limerick. Manufacturing was moved to Poland, with the loss of about two thirds of the jobs at Dell's Limerick operation.

The murder of two innocent men in Limerick within months of each other: Shane Geoghegan and Roy Collins increased pressure on O'Dea locally, as a member of the cabinet, to secure changes to the law and greater resources to tackle Limerick city's gangland crime.

On 5 February 2010, O'Dea announced that the government would not deliver its commitments to fund the Limerick Regeneration project. The €1.7bn funds (between 2009 and 2018) promised by the government will no longer be delivered.

In October 2017, Willie O'Dea accused Johnny Depp of libel after calling Limerick 'Stab City', a term once linked with the city.

It was announced in 2021 that O'Dea and former minister Batt O'Keeffe had left the board of a UK property developer linked to the bulk sale of social housing in Limerick to approved housing bodies that qualify for State funding. Mr O’Dea had been non-executive chairman of Formation Group since mid-2014.

== Defamation case and resignation ==
On 10 March 2009, O'Dea alleged in an interview with the Limerick Leader that a brothel had been operating in a house owned by Nessan Quinlivan, brother of Maurice Quinlivan who at the time was a Sinn Féin candidate in Limerick for the upcoming June 2009 local elections. On 14 April 2009, O'Dea signed an affidavit to the courts, denying making such allegations. Quinlivan sought an injunction under the Prevention of Electoral Abuses Act 1923: under section 11 of the act it is a criminal offence to make or publish a false statement of fact in relation to an election candidate. In December 2009, O'Dea settled the case out of court and apologised to Quinlivan for making "false and defamatory statements" during the interview, after a tape recording of the interview emerged. O'Dea also paid an undisclosed sum in damages to Quinlivan. A settlement agreement was read out in the High Court.

On 16 February 2010, Fine Gael announced it intended to table a motion of no confidence in O'Dea, however, the government responded with a motion of confidence. The government won the confidence motion in O'Dea in the Dáil on 17 February 2010. The Green Party, coalition partners in government with O'Dea's party, voted with Fianna Fáil on the motion. However, Green Party Chairman Senator Dan Boyle wrote on Twitter, that he has "no confidence" in O'Dea and declaring him to be "compromised".

On 18 February 2010, O'Dea resigned as Minister for Defence. In his resignation letter, he said that he had come to the conclusion: "that my continuing in office would distract from the important and vital work of the Government". O'Dea said he decided to resign when it became clear that the Green Party would no longer support the Government if he was to stay in office.

== Reappointment to front bench ==
O'Dea was appointed to Micheál Martin's frontbench as Spokesperson for Communications, as part of the Fianna Fáil campaign for the 2011 general election.

In the 2011 election he was re-elected to the newly formed Limerick City constituency, polling 16% of the vote, down from the 39% he polled four years previously. He was the Fianna Fáil Spokesperson on Enterprise, Jobs and Innovation from April 2011 to July 2012. In July 2012, he was appointed as Spokesperson on Social Protection and Social Equality.

At the 2016 general election, O'Dea increased his share of the first preference from 16% to 27.8%. He was re-elected on the first count. He was re-elected again at the 2020 general election, with a reduced vote share. O'Dea topped the poll in the 2024 general election, securing 19.48% of the first preference votes in the Limerick City constituency.

O'Dea is understood to have raised concerns about the direction of the Fianna Fáil party under the leadership of Micheál Martin at internal party meetings. Almost two years after the Coalition Government with Fine Gael and the Green Party was formed, O'Dea remarked that “By now I think you’d have more chance of getting young people interested in the music of Big Tom than getting them into Fianna Fáil,” in reference to the Irish country and traditional music singer.

In 2023, O'Dea voiced his criticism of the decision by the Minister for Justice, Simon Harris, to grant an application by convicted killer Logan Jackson, to move him from Limerick Prison to a jail in Great Britain, so as to be nearer his family. O'Dea supported the legal challenge by Tracey Tully, the mother of the murdered champion Irish boxer, Kevin Sheehy.

Following Fianna Fáil's disastrous presidential election campaign in 2025, senior TDs Willie O'Dea, Seán Ó Fearghaíl and Pat 'the Cope’ Gallagher issued a statement criticising the leadership's handling of the campaign and its aftermath, with reference to "the top-down autocratic style of politics" within the internal culture of the party.

Political offices
Preceded by Noel Treacy	Minister of State at the Department of Justice; 1992–1994	Succeeded by Joan Burton; Austin Currie
Preceded by Chris Flood	Minister of State at the Department of Health; 1993–1994	Succeeded by Austin Currie; Brian O'Shea
Preceded by Bernard Allen as Minister of State at the Department of Education	Minister of State at the Department of Education and Science; 1997–2002; With: Michael Smith (July–Oct. 1997); Noel Treacy (Oct. 1997–2002); Frank Fahey (1998–2000); Mary Hanafin (2000–2002)	Succeeded by Síle de Valera; Brian Lenihan
Preceded by Mary Hanafin; Mary Wallace	Minister of State at the Department of Justice, Equality and Law Reform; 2002–2004; With: Brian Lenihan	Succeeded by Frank Fahey; Brian Lenihan
Preceded by Michael Smith	Minister for Defence; 2004–2010	Succeeded by Brian Cowen (acting)
Honorary titles
Preceded by Enda Kenny	Father of the Dáil; 2020–present	Incumbent

Dáil	Election	Deputy (Party)	Deputy (Party)	Deputy (Party)	Deputy (Party)	Deputy (Party)
13th	1948	Michael Keyes (Lab)	Robert Ryan (FF)	James Reidy (FG)	Daniel Bourke (FF)	4 seats 1948–1981
14th	1951	Michael Keyes (Lab)	Tadhg Crowley (FF)	James Reidy (FG)	Daniel Bourke (FF)	4 seats 1948–1981
14th	1952 by-election	Michael Keyes (Lab)	Tadhg Crowley (FF)	James Reidy (FG)	John Carew (FG)	4 seats 1948–1981
15th	1954	Michael Keyes (Lab)	Tadhg Crowley (FF)	Donogh O'Malley (FF)	John Carew (FG)	4 seats 1948–1981
16th	1957	Ted Russell (Ind.)	Paddy Clohessy (FF)	Donogh O'Malley (FF)	John Carew (FG)	4 seats 1948–1981
17th	1961	Stephen Coughlan (Lab)	Paddy Clohessy (FF)	Donogh O'Malley (FF)	Tom O'Donnell (FG)	4 seats 1948–1981
18th	1965	Stephen Coughlan (Lab)	Paddy Clohessy (FF)	Donogh O'Malley (FF)	Tom O'Donnell (FG)	4 seats 1948–1981
18th	1968 by-election	Stephen Coughlan (Lab)	Paddy Clohessy (FF)	Desmond O'Malley (FF)	Tom O'Donnell (FG)	4 seats 1948–1981
19th	1969	Stephen Coughlan (Lab)	Michael Herbert (FF)	Desmond O'Malley (FF)	Tom O'Donnell (FG)	4 seats 1948–1981
20th	1973	Stephen Coughlan (Lab)	Michael Herbert (FF)	Desmond O'Malley (FF)	Tom O'Donnell (FG)	4 seats 1948–1981
21st	1977	Michael Lipper (Ind.)	Michael Herbert (FF)	Desmond O'Malley (FF)	Tom O'Donnell (FG)	4 seats 1948–1981
22nd	1981	Jim Kemmy (Ind.)	Peadar Clohessy (FF)	Desmond O'Malley (FF)	Tom O'Donnell (FG)	Michael Noonan (FG)
23rd	1982 (Feb)	Jim Kemmy (DSP)	Willie O'Dea (FF)	Desmond O'Malley (FF)	Tom O'Donnell (FG)	Michael Noonan (FG)
24th	1982 (Nov)	Frank Prendergast (Lab)	Willie O'Dea (FF)	Desmond O'Malley (FF)	Tom O'Donnell (FG)	Michael Noonan (FG)
25th	1987	Jim Kemmy (DSP)	Willie O'Dea (FF)	Desmond O'Malley (PDs)	Peadar Clohessy (PDs)	Michael Noonan (FG)
26th	1989	Jim Kemmy (DSP)	Willie O'Dea (FF)	Desmond O'Malley (PDs)	Peadar Clohessy (PDs)	Michael Noonan (FG)
27th	1992	Jim Kemmy (Lab)	Willie O'Dea (FF)	Desmond O'Malley (PDs)	Peadar Clohessy (PDs)	Michael Noonan (FG)
28th	1997	Jim Kemmy (Lab)	Willie O'Dea (FF)	Desmond O'Malley (PDs)	Eddie Wade (FF)	Michael Noonan (FG)
28th	1998 by-election	Jan O'Sullivan (Lab)	Willie O'Dea (FF)	Desmond O'Malley (PDs)	Eddie Wade (FF)	Michael Noonan (FG)
29th	2002	Jan O'Sullivan (Lab)	Willie O'Dea (FF)	Tim O'Malley (PDs)	Peter Power (FF)	Michael Noonan (FG)
30th	2007	Jan O'Sullivan (Lab)	Willie O'Dea (FF)	Kieran O'Donnell (FG)	Peter Power (FF)	Michael Noonan (FG)
31st	2011	Constituency abolished. See Limerick City and Limerick				

Dáil	Election	Deputy (Party)	Deputy (Party)	Deputy (Party)	Deputy (Party)
31st	2011	Jan O'Sullivan (Lab)	Willie O'Dea (FF)	Kieran O'Donnell (FG)	Michael Noonan (FG)
32nd	2016	Jan O'Sullivan (Lab)	Willie O'Dea (FF)	Maurice Quinlivan (SF)	Michael Noonan (FG)
33rd	2020	Brian Leddin (GP)	Willie O'Dea (FF)	Maurice Quinlivan (SF)	Kieran O'Donnell (FG)
34th	2024	Conor Sheehan (Lab)	Willie O'Dea (FF)	Maurice Quinlivan (SF)	Kieran O'Donnell (FG)
