= Mary Wallace =

Irish former politician (born 1959)

Minister of State
- 2008–2009: Health and Children
- 2007–2008: Agriculture, Fisheries and Food
- 2006–2007: Agriculture and Food
- 1997–2002: Justice, Equality and Law Reform

Teachta Dála
- In office May 2007 – February 2011
- Constituency: Meath East
- In office June 1989 – May 2007
- Constituency: Meath

Senator
- In office 25 April 1987 – 15 June 1989
- Constituency: Administrative Panel

Personal details
- Born: 13 June 1959 (age 67) Dublin, Ireland
- Party: Fianna Fáil
- Spouse: Declan Gannon
- Children: 1
- Education: College of Commerce, Rathmines

Mary Wallace (born 13 June 1959) is an Irish former Fianna Fáil politician who served as Minister of State at the Department of Health from 2008 to 2009, Minister of State at the Department of Agriculture, Food and the Marine from 2006 to 2008, and Minister of State at the Department of Justice from 1998 to 2002. She served as a Teachta Dála (TD) for the Meath and Meath East constituencies from 1989 to 2011. She was a Senator for the Administrative Panel from 1987 to 1989.

== Early life ==
Wallace was born in Dublin in 1959. She was educated at the Loreto Convents in Balbriggan and North Great Georges Street, Dublin and the College of Commerce, Rathmines, where she received a diploma in Hospital and Health Services Administration. Following this, she went on to work as a Personnel Executive in Blanchardstown Hospital.

== Political career ==
Wallace first held political office in 1982 when she was elected to Meath County Council. She served on that authority until 1997. In 1987, she was elected to the 18th Seanad Éireann as a Senator for the Administrative Panel, having failed to get elected to Dáil Éireann at the 1987 general election. She was successful at the 1989 general election and was elected for the Meath constituency. She retained her seat at each subsequent election, moving to the new Meath East constituency for the 2007 general election.

Wallace remained on the backbenches until 1995 when she became Opposition Spokesperson for people with disabilities and carers. When Fianna Fáil came to office in 1997 under Bertie Ahern, she was appointed as Department of Justice, Equality and Law Reform with responsibility for equality and disabilities. The Disability Bill she was piloting through the Dáil was withdrawn and she was not re-appointed after the 2002 general election.

In February 2006, Wallace rejoined the junior ministerial team as Minister of State at the Department of Agriculture and Food with special responsibility for Forestry. Her promotion caused some surprise as Seán Haughey had been the front-runner for promotion, while Wallace's name had not even been mentioned. She was reappointed to the same responsibility the following year on the formation of a new government.

In May 2008, after Brian Cowen succeeded Ahern as Taoiseach, she was appointed as Minister of State at the Department of Health and Children with special responsibility for Health Promotion and Food Safety. She lost her position as Minister of State in a reshuffle on 21 April 2009, when Cowen reduced the number of Ministers of State from 20 to 15.

She retired from politics at the 2011 general election.

Political offices
Preceded by Joan Burton; Austin Currie as Ministers of State at the Department of Justice	Minister of State at the Department of Justice, Equality and Law Reform; 1997–2002; With: Frank Fahey (1998–2000); Mary Hanafin (2000–2002)	Succeeded by Willie O'Dea; Brian Lenihan
Preceded by John Browne; Brendan Smith	Minister of State at the Department of Agriculture and Food; 2006–2007; With: Brendan Smith	Succeeded by Herself and others as Ministers of State at the Department of Agriculture, Fisheries and Food
Preceded by Herself and others as Ministers of State at the Department of Agriculture and Food	Minister of State at the Department of Agriculture, Fisheries and Food; 2007–2008; With: John Browne; Trevor Sargent	Succeeded by Tony Killeen; Trevor Sargent
Preceded by Jimmy Devins; Pat "the Cope" Gallagher; Máire Hoctor; Brendan Smith	Minister of State at the Department of Health and Children; 2008–2009; With: Barry Andrews; Máire Hoctor; John Moloney	Succeeded by Barry Andrews; Áine Brady; John Moloney; Trevor Sargent

Dáil	Election	Deputy (Party)	Deputy (Party)	Deputy (Party)
4th	1923	Patrick Mulvany (FP)	David Hall (Lab)	Eamonn Duggan (CnaG)
5th	1927 (Jun)	Matthew O'Reilly (FF)	David Hall (Lab)	Eamonn Duggan (CnaG)
6th	1927 (Sep)	Matthew O'Reilly (FF)	Arthur Matthews (CnaG)	Eamonn Duggan (CnaG)
7th	1932	James Kelly (FF)	Arthur Matthews (CnaG)	Eamonn Duggan (CnaG)
8th	1933	James Kelly (FF)	Robert Davitt (CnaG)	Matthew O'Reilly (FF)
9th	1937	Constituency abolished. See Meath–Westmeath		

Dáil	Election	Deputy (Party)	Deputy (Party)	Deputy (Party)	Deputy (Party)	Deputy (Party)
13th	1948	Matthew O'Reilly (FF)	Michael Hilliard (FF)	3 seats until 1977	Patrick Giles (FG)	3 seats until 1977
14th	1951	Matthew O'Reilly (FF)	Michael Hilliard (FF)	3 seats until 1977	Patrick Giles (FG)	3 seats until 1977
15th	1954	James Tully (Lab)	Michael Hilliard (FF)	3 seats until 1977	Patrick Giles (FG)	3 seats until 1977
16th	1957	James Griffin (FF)	Michael Hilliard (FF)	3 seats until 1977	Patrick Giles (FG)	3 seats until 1977
16th	1959 by-election	Henry Johnston (FF)	Michael Hilliard (FF)	3 seats until 1977	Patrick Giles (FG)	3 seats until 1977
17th	1961	James Tully (Lab)	Michael Hilliard (FF)	3 seats until 1977	Denis Farrelly (FG)	3 seats until 1977
18th	1965	James Tully (Lab)	Michael Hilliard (FF)	3 seats until 1977	Denis Farrelly (FG)	3 seats until 1977
19th	1969	James Tully (Lab)	Michael Hilliard (FF)	3 seats until 1977	John Bruton (FG)	3 seats until 1977
20th	1973	James Tully (Lab)	Brendan Crinion (FF)	3 seats until 1977	John Bruton (FG)	3 seats until 1977
21st	1977	James Tully (Lab)	Brendan Crinion (FF)	Jim Fitzsimons (FF)	John Bruton (FG)	4 seats 1977–1981
22nd	1981	James Tully (Lab)	Brendan Crinion (FF)	Jim Fitzsimons (FF)	John Bruton (FG)	John V. Farrelly (FG)
23rd	1982 (Feb)	Michael Lynch (FF)	Colm Hilliard (FF)	Jim Fitzsimons (FF)	John Bruton (FG)	John V. Farrelly (FG)
24th	1982 (Nov)	Frank McLoughlin (Lab)	Colm Hilliard (FF)	Jim Fitzsimons (FF)	John Bruton (FG)	John V. Farrelly (FG)
25th	1987	Michael Lynch (FF)	Colm Hilliard (FF)	Noel Dempsey (FF)	John Bruton (FG)	John V. Farrelly (FG)
26th	1989	Mary Wallace (FF)	Colm Hilliard (FF)	Noel Dempsey (FF)	John Bruton (FG)	John V. Farrelly (FG)
27th	1992	Mary Wallace (FF)	Colm Hilliard (FF)	Noel Dempsey (FF)	John Bruton (FG)	Brian Fitzgerald (Lab)
28th	1997	Mary Wallace (FF)	Johnny Brady (FF)	Noel Dempsey (FF)	John Bruton (FG)	John V. Farrelly (FG)
29th	2002	Mary Wallace (FF)	Johnny Brady (FF)	Noel Dempsey (FF)	John Bruton (FG)	Damien English (FG)
29th	2005 by-election	Mary Wallace (FF)	Johnny Brady (FF)	Noel Dempsey (FF)	Shane McEntee (FG)	Damien English (FG)
30th	2007	Constituency abolished. See Meath East and Meath West				

Dáil	Election	Deputy (Party)	Deputy (Party)	Deputy (Party)	Deputy (Party)
30th	2007	Thomas Byrne (FF)	Mary Wallace (FF)	Shane McEntee (FG)	3 seats 2007–2024
31st	2011	Dominic Hannigan (Lab)	Regina Doherty (FG)	Shane McEntee (FG)	3 seats 2007–2024
31st	2013 by-election	Dominic Hannigan (Lab)	Regina Doherty (FG)	Helen McEntee (FG)	3 seats 2007–2024
32nd	2016	Thomas Byrne (FF)	Regina Doherty (FG)	Helen McEntee (FG)	3 seats 2007–2024
33rd	2020	Thomas Byrne (FF)	Darren O'Rourke (SF)	Helen McEntee (FG)	3 seats 2007–2024
34th	2024	Thomas Byrne (FF)	Darren O'Rourke (SF)	Helen McEntee (FG)	Gillian Toole (Ind.)
