= Minister of State at the Department of Justice, Home Affairs and Migration =

List of Irish ministers of state

The minister of state at the Department of Justice, Home Affairs and Migration is a junior ministerial post in the Department of Justice, Home Affairs and Migration of the Government of Ireland who performs duties and functions delegated by the minister for justice, home affairs and migration. A minister of state does not hold cabinet rank.

There are currently two ministers of state:

- Colm Brophy, TD – Minister of State for Migration
- Catherine Ardagh, TD – Minister of State for International law, law reform and youth justice

== List of parliamentary secretaries ==
Name	Term of office		Party	Government
James FitzGerald-Kenney	8 August 1927	11 October 1927	Cumann na nGaedheal	4th EC
Charles Haughey	9 May 1960	11 October 1961	Fianna Fáil	9th
Brian Lenihan	11 October 1961	3 November 1964	Fianna Fáil	10th

== List of ministers of state ==
=== Department of Justice 1978–1997 ===
Name	Term of office		Party	Responsibilities	Government
David Andrews	1 January 1979	11 December 1979	Fianna Fáil		15th
Seán Doherty	25 March 1980	30 June 1981	Fianna Fáil		16th
Dick Spring	30 June 1981	9 March 1982	Labour	Law Reform	17th
Nuala Fennell	7 January 1983	10 March 1987	Fine Gael	Family Law Reform	19th
Noel Treacy	6 February 1991	11 February 1992	Fianna Fáil		21st
Willie O'Dea	13 February 1992	12 January 1993	Fianna Fáil		22nd
Willie O'Dea	14 January 1993	15 December 1994	Fianna Fáil		23rd
Joan Burton	20 December 1994	26 June 1997	Labour		24th
Austin Currie	20 December 1994	26 June 1997	Fine Gael	Children	24th
=== Department of Justice, Equality and Law Reform 1997–2010 ===
Name	Term of office		Party	Responsibilities	Government
Mary Wallace	8 July 1997	6 June 2002	Fianna Fáil	Equality and disability	25th
Frank Fahey	21 January 1998	27 January 2000	Fianna Fáil	Children	25th
Mary Hanafin	27 January 2000	6 June 2002	Fianna Fáil	Children	25th
Willie O'Dea	19 June 2002	29 September 2004	Fianna Fáil	Equality and disability	26th
Brian Lenihan	19 June 2002	14 June 2007	Fianna Fáil	Children	26th
Frank Fahey	29 September 2004	14 June 2007	Fianna Fáil	Equality and disability	26th
Seán Power	20 June 2007	7 May 2008	Fianna Fáil	Equality	27th
Brendan Smith	20 June 2007	7 May 2008	Fianna Fáil	Children	27th
Conor Lenihan	20 June 2007	7 May 2008	Fianna Fáil	Integration	27th
Barry Andrews	7 May 2008	23 March 2010	Fianna Fáil	Children	28th
Conor Lenihan	13 May 2008	22 April 2009	Fianna Fáil	Integration	28th
John Moloney	13 May 2008	23 March 2010	Fianna Fáil	Equality and Disability Issues	28th
John Curran	22 April 2009	23 March 2010	Fianna Fáil	Integration	28th
=== Department of Justice and Law Reform 2010–2011 ===
Name	Term of office		Party	Responsibilities	Government
Barry Andrews	23 March 2010	23 January 2011	Fianna Fáil	Children	28th
Mary White	23 March 2010	23 January 2011	Green	Equality and Human Rights; and Integration	28th
John Moloney	23 March 2010	9 March 2011	Fianna Fáil	Disability	28th
=== Department of Justice and Equality 2011–2020 ===
Name	Term of office		Party	Responsibilities	Government
Kathleen Lynch	10 March 2011	23 May 2014	Labour	Disability and equality	29th
Aodhán Ó Ríordáin	15 July 2014	6 May 2016	Labour	New communities and equality	29th
Finian McGrath	6 May 2016	27 June 2020	Independent	Disability	30th • 31st
Dara Murphy	19 May 2016	14 June 2017	Fine Gael	Data protection	30th
David Stanton	19 May 2016	14 June 2017	Fine Gael	Equality, Immigration, and Integration	30th
David Stanton	20 June 2017	27 June 2020	Fine Gael	Equality, Immigration, and Integration	31st
Pat Breen	20 June 2017	27 June 2020	Fine Gael	Data protection	31st
Charlie McConalogue	1 July 2020	2 September 2020	Fianna Fáil	Law reform	32nd
=== Department of Justice 2020–2025 ===
Name	Term of office		Party	Responsibilities	Government
Hildegarde Naughton	27 April 2021	1 November 2021	Fine Gael	Criminal justice	32nd
James Browne	2 September 2020	23 January 2025	Fianna Fáil	Law Reform and Youth Justice; Civil justice and immigration (Apr.–Oct. 2021)	32nd • 33rd • 34th
=== Department of Justice, Home Affairs and Migration 2025–present ===
Name	Term of office		Party	Responsibilities	Government
Niall Collins	29 January 2025	28 May 2026	Fianna Fáil	International law, law reform and youth justice	35th
Colm Brophy	23 February 2025	Incumbent	Fine Gael	Migration	35th
Catherine Ardagh	28 May 2026	Incumbent	Fianna Fáil	International law, law reform and youth justice	35th
