= Mary Butler (politician) =

Irish politician (born 1966)

Mary Butler TD
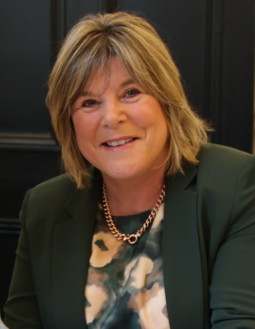
- Butler in 2024

Government Chief Whip
- Incumbent
- Assumed office 23 January 2025
- Taoiseach: Micheál Martin
- Preceded by: Hildegarde Naughton

Minister of State
- 2020–: Health

Chair of the Committee on Jobs, Enterprise and Innovation
- In office 4 April 2016 – 1 July 2020
- Preceded by: Damien English
- Succeeded by: Maurice Quinlivan

Teachta Dála
- Incumbent
- Assumed office February 2016
- Constituency: Waterford

Personal details
- Born: 29 September 1966 (age 60) Waterford, Ireland
- Party: Fianna Fáil
- Spouse: Michael Butler (m. 1988)
- Children: 3
- Education: Waterford Institute of Technology

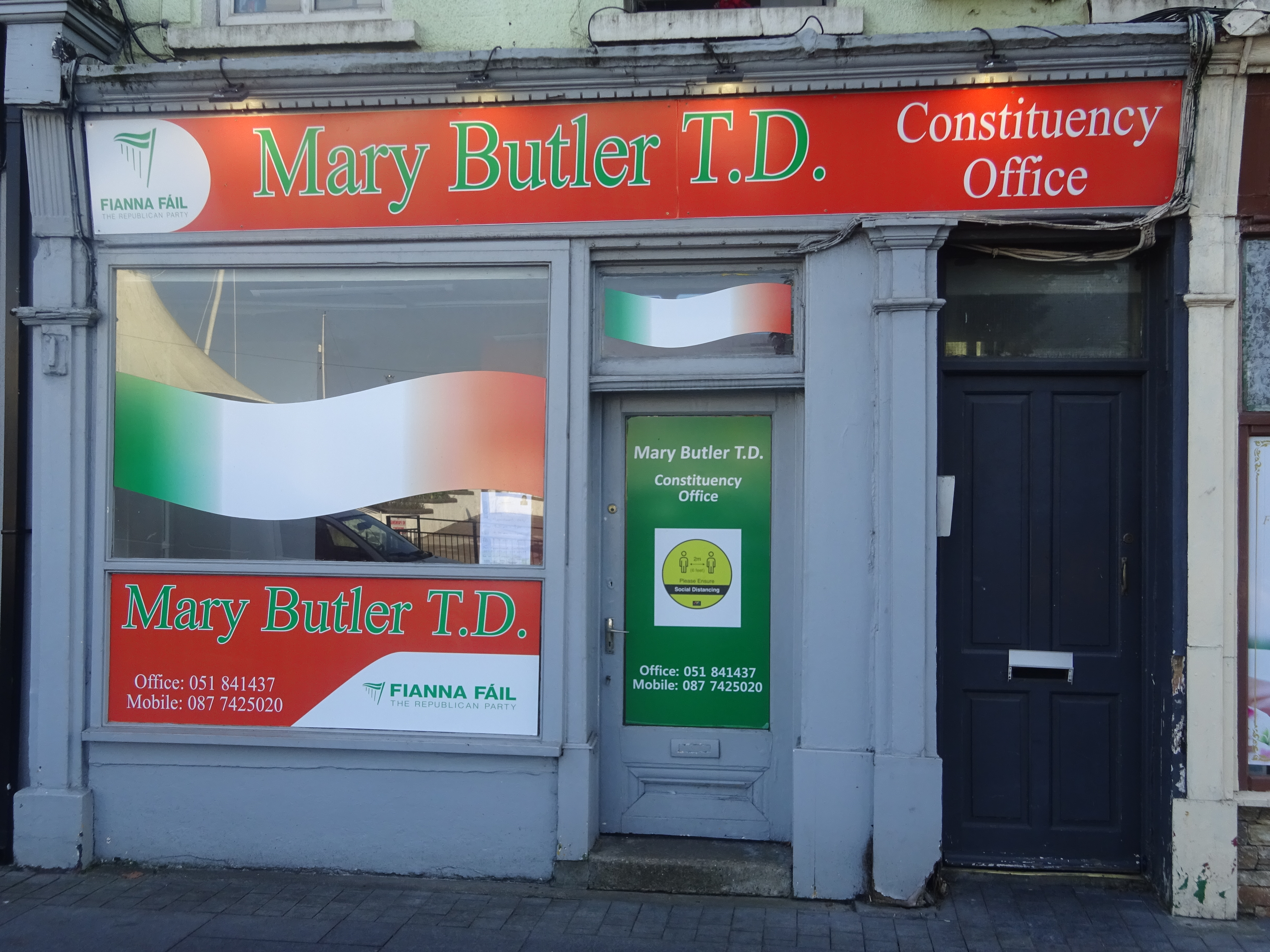
Bulter's constituency office in Waterford

Mary Butler (born 29 September 1966) is an Irish Fianna Fáil politician who has served as Government Chief Whip since January 2025, and Minister of State at the Department of Health since July 2020. She has been a Teachta Dála (TD) for the Waterford constituency since 2016. She previously served as chair of the Committee on Jobs, Enterprise and Innovation from 2016 to 2020.

== Political career ==
She was the Fianna Fáil junior spokesperson for Older People and Chair of Oireachtas Cross Party group on Dementia. She had been a member of Waterford City and County Council from 2014 to 2016, before her election to the Dáil in 2016.

Butler was opposed to the legalisation of abortion in Ireland. She called for a No vote in the 2018 referendum on abortion, and co-organised an event calling for a No vote.

Butler put forward a bill in 2018 with the aim of banning tattoos and intimate piercings for people under the age of eighteen; this bill lapsed with the dissolution of the Dáil.

In 2020, she was appointed as Minister of State at the Department of Health with responsibility for Mental Health and Older People.

=== Canvassing controversy ===
Former Fianna Fáil TD Brendan Kenneally canvassed for Butler during the 2016 general election campaign, at which she was first elected to the Dáil. Bill Kenneally, a cousin of Kenneally's, was convicted of 1980s sexual abuse of boys, and Kenneally had previously acknowledged that he had been aware of his cousin's crimes before his sentencing to 14 years imprisonment. Butler received criticism for Kenneally's involvement in her 2016 campaign. However, four years later, she again had Keneally canvass for her ahead of the 2020 general election. Kenneally's canvassing for Mary Butler in 2020 became public knowledge when it emerged that he had visited the homes of some of those who had been abused to seek their votes.

It also emerged that Butler was renting her constituency office from Kenneally, and when it did so, she stated in an interview that she would move elsewhere and did so in early 2020.

At the 2024 general election, Butler was re-elected to the Dáil.

== Personal life ==
Butler is married to Michael, and they have three children. She survived a skin cancer scare in 2022.

Political offices
Preceded by Jim Daly	Minister of State at the Department of Health; 2020–present	Incumbent
Preceded by Hildegarde Naughton	Government Chief Whip; 2025–present	Incumbent

Dáil	Election	Deputy (Party)	Deputy (Party)	Deputy (Party)	Deputy (Party)
4th	1923	Caitlín Brugha (Rep)	John Butler (Lab)	Nicholas Wall (FP)	William Redmond (NL)
5th	1927 (Jun)	Caitlín Brugha (Rep)	Patrick Little (FF)	Vincent White (CnaG)	William Redmond (NL)
6th	1927 (Sep)	Seán Goulding (FF)	Patrick Little (FF)	Vincent White (CnaG)	William Redmond (NL)
7th	1932	Seán Goulding (FF)	Patrick Little (FF)	John Kiersey (CnaG)	William Redmond (CnaG)
8th	1933	Seán Goulding (FF)	Patrick Little (FF)	Nicholas Wall (NCP)	Bridget Redmond (CnaG)
9th	1937	Michael Morrissey (FF)	Patrick Little (FF)	Nicholas Wall (FG)	Bridget Redmond (FG)
10th	1938	Michael Morrissey (FF)	Patrick Little (FF)	William Broderick (FG)	Bridget Redmond (FG)
11th	1943	Michael Morrissey (FF)	Patrick Little (FF)	Denis Heskin (CnaT)	Bridget Redmond (FG)
12th	1944	Michael Morrissey (FF)	Patrick Little (FF)	Denis Heskin (CnaT)	Bridget Redmond (FG)
12th	1947 by-election	John Ormonde (FF)	Patrick Little (FF)	Denis Heskin (CnaT)	Bridget Redmond (FG)
13th	1948	John Ormonde (FF)	Patrick Little (FF)	Thomas Kyne (Lab)	Bridget Redmond (FG)
14th	1951	John Ormonde (FF)	Patrick Little (FF)	Thomas Kyne (Lab)	Bridget Redmond (FG)
14th	1952 by-election	John Ormonde (FF)	Patrick Little (FF)	Thomas Kyne (Lab)	William Kenneally (FF)
15th	1954	John Ormonde (FF)	Thaddeus Lynch (FG)	Thomas Kyne (Lab)	William Kenneally (FF)
16th	1957	John Ormonde (FF)	Thaddeus Lynch (FG)	Thomas Kyne (Lab)	William Kenneally (FF)
17th	1961	John Ormonde (FF)	Thaddeus Lynch (FG)	Thomas Kyne (Lab)	3 seats 1961–1977
18th	1965	Billy Kenneally (FF)	Thaddeus Lynch (FG)	Thomas Kyne (Lab)	3 seats 1961–1977
18th	1966 by-election	Billy Kenneally (FF)	Fad Browne (FF)	Thomas Kyne (Lab)	3 seats 1961–1977
19th	1969	Billy Kenneally (FF)	Fad Browne (FF)	Edward Collins (FG)	3 seats 1961–1977
20th	1973	Billy Kenneally (FF)	Thomas Kyne (Lab)	Edward Collins (FG)	3 seats 1961–1977
21st	1977	Billy Kenneally (FF)	Jackie Fahey (FF)	Edward Collins (FG)	Austin Deasy (FG)
22nd	1981	Billy Kenneally (FF)	Jackie Fahey (FF)	Edward Collins (FG)	Austin Deasy (FG)
23rd	1982 (Feb)	Paddy Gallagher (SF–WP)	Jackie Fahey (FF)	Edward Collins (FG)	Austin Deasy (FG)
24th	1982 (Nov)	Donal Ormonde (FF)	Jackie Fahey (FF)	Edward Collins (FG)	Austin Deasy (FG)
25th	1987	Martin Cullen (PDs)	Jackie Fahey (FF)	Brian Swift (FF)	Austin Deasy (FG)
26th	1989	Brian O'Shea (Lab)	Jackie Fahey (FF)	Brendan Kenneally (FF)	Austin Deasy (FG)
27th	1992	Brian O'Shea (Lab)	Martin Cullen (PDs)	Brendan Kenneally (FF)	Austin Deasy (FG)
28th	1997	Brian O'Shea (Lab)	Martin Cullen (FF)	Brendan Kenneally (FF)	Austin Deasy (FG)
29th	2002	Brian O'Shea (Lab)	Martin Cullen (FF)	Ollie Wilkinson (FF)	John Deasy (FG)
30th	2007	Brian O'Shea (Lab)	Martin Cullen (FF)	Brendan Kenneally (FF)	John Deasy (FG)
31st	2011	Ciara Conway (Lab)	John Halligan (Ind.)	Paudie Coffey (FG)	John Deasy (FG)
32nd	2016	David Cullinane (SF)	John Halligan (Ind.)	Mary Butler (FF)	John Deasy (FG)
33rd	2020	David Cullinane (SF)	Marc Ó Cathasaigh (GP)	Mary Butler (FF)	Matt Shanahan (Ind.)
34th	2024	David Cullinane (SF)	Conor D. McGuinness (SF)	Mary Butler (FF)	John Cummins (FG)
