= Hildegarde Naughton =

Irish politician (born 1977)

Hildegarde Naughton TD
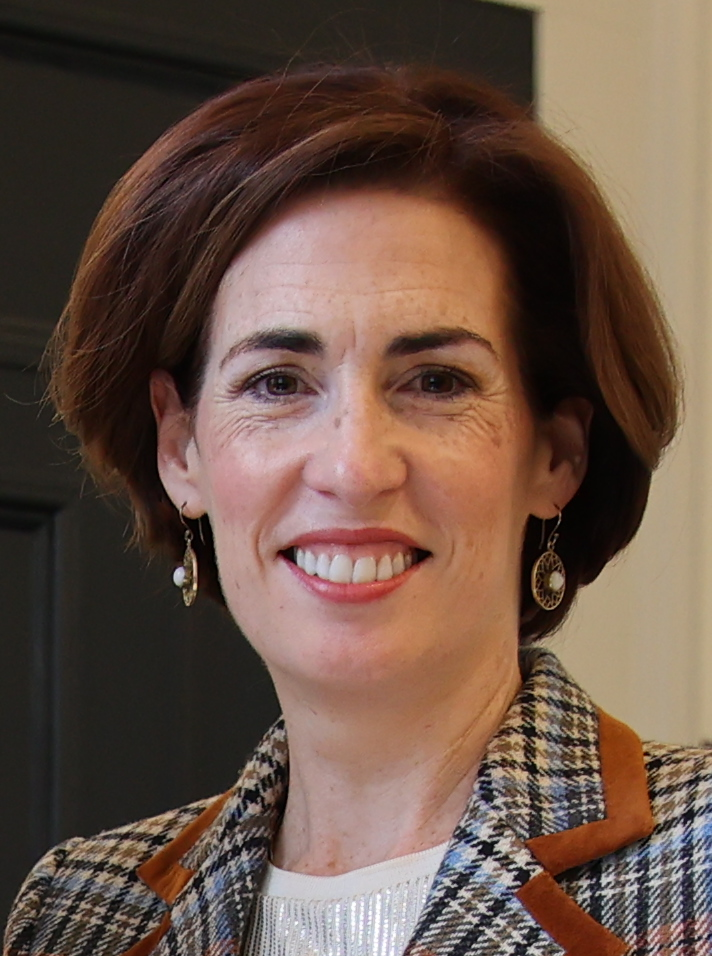
- Naughton in 2024

Minister for Education and Youth
- Incumbent
- Assumed office 18 November 2025
- Taoiseach: Micheál Martin
- Preceded by: Helen McEntee

Minister of State
- 2025: Children, Disability and Equality
- 2024–2025: Education
- 2022–2024: Health
- 2021: Justice
- 2020–2022: Environment, Climate and Communications
- 2020–2022: Transport

Government Chief Whip
- In office 17 December 2022 – 23 January 2025
- Taoiseach: Leo Varadkar; Simon Harris
- Preceded by: Jack Chambers
- Succeeded by: Mary Butler

Chair of the Committee on Communications, Climate Action and the Environment
- In office 4 April 2016 – 27 June 2020
- Preceded by: New office
- Succeeded by: Brian Leddin

Teachta Dála
- Incumbent
- Assumed office February 2016
- Constituency: Galway West

Senator
- In office 19 July 2013 – 26 February 2016
- Constituency: Nominated by the Taoiseach

Personal details
- Born: 1 May 1977 (age 49) Galway, Ireland
- Party: Fine Gael
- Education: NUI Galway; Mary Immaculate College

Hildegarde Naughton (born 1 May 1977) is an Irish Fine Gael politician who has served as Minister for Education and Youth since November 2025. A Teachta Dála (TD) for Galway West since 2016, she served as a Minister of State in attendance at cabinet from 2020 to 2025 and Government Chief Whip from 2022 to 2025. She served as Chair of the Committee on Communications, Climate Action and the Environment from 2016 to 2020 and Mayor of Galway from 2011 to 2012. She also served as a Senator from 2013 to 2016, after being nominated by the Taoiseach.

== Personal life ==
Naughton was born in Galway in 1977, she is from Oranmore and lives in the east of Galway city. Her father was a member of the Fine Gael National Executive. She was teacher at St. Patrick's Boys School in Galway. She is a classically trained soprano, and in 2008 won the Association of Irish Musical Societies' Best Actress award for her role as Eliza Doolittle in the Galway Patrician Musical Society's production of My Fair Lady. She speaks fluent French. She was co-ordinator of the 2007 Telethon People in Need Campaign for Galway City and County, which raised over €300,000 for local charities.

Shortly after her appointment as Government Chief Whip and Minister of State at the Department of Health with special responsibility for Public Health, Wellbeing and the National Drugs, Naughton told the media she had smoked cannabis in her 20s.

== Political career ==
Naughton surprised many by unseating party colleague John Mulholland at the 2009 local election in the Galway City West local electoral area (Salthill-Claddagh-Knocknacarra). John Cunningham suggested that personal networking, effective postering, and the endorsement of Maureen Egan aided her victory. After her election, she was a director on Galway City Partnership Board and a member of Galway City Council's Transport Strategic Policy Committee and the Galway City Vocational Education Committee.

Naughton ran unsuccessfully for the Dáil at the 2011 general election in Galway West. During the campaign in January, she alleged that councillors had been "doing the bidding" of a "hidden elite" for 20 years. In June, she was Fine Gael's choice for Mayor of Galway for 2011–2012, part of a pact rotating the post between Fine Gael, Labour Party, and some independent members. Her nomination was in doubt after Councillors objected to her allegation the previous January. She unreservedly withdrew the comments before the mayoral vote was taken.

She caused controversy when she used her casting vote as mayor to deny David Norris the right to address Galway City Council during his campaign to get a nomination for the 2011 presidential election. She later claimed it was a "misunderstanding".

At the 2011 general election, Naughton was one of four Fine Gael candidates for the five seats in Galway West; Seán Kyne and Brian Walsh were elected, while Naughton and Fidelma Healy Eames were unsuccessful. In July 2013, Walsh was expelled from the Fine Gael parliamentary party for voting against the party whip on the Protection of Life During Pregnancy Bill 2013. Healy Eames was expelled a week after Walsh for opposing the same bill in the Seanad. On 19 July 2013, Naughton was appointed to the Seanad by Taoiseach Enda Kenny. Walsh was readmitted into the Fine Gael parliamentary party in 2014, but resigned for health reasons before the general election.

At the 2016 general election, Naughton was elected to the Dáil alongside her party colleague Seán Kyne. In October 2019, she was appointed to the chair of the Dáil committee investigating ethics complaints about members who voted on behalf of colleagues. She was later forced to resign after it came to light that she had done the same on several occasions. Voting on behalf of colleagues in the Dáil was not permitted. At the 2020 general election, Naughton was re-elected to the Dáil, as the sole Fine Gael TD in the five-seat constituency.

In June 2020, at the formation of the 32nd government of Ireland, Naughton was appointed as one of three Ministers of State attending cabinet. She was appointed as Minister of State at the Department of Transport with special responsibility for International and Road Transport and Logistics and Minister of State at the Department of the Environment, Climate and Communications with special responsibility for Postal Policy and Eircodes. From 27 April to 1 November 2021, Naughton was assigned additional responsibilities as Minister of State at the Department of Justice with responsibility for criminal justice, during the maternity leave of Minister for Justice Helen McEntee.

In December 2022, she was appointed as Government Chief Whip and Minister of State at the Department of Health with special responsibility for Public Health, Wellbeing and the National Drugs Strategy following the appointment of Leo Varadkar as Taoiseach.

At the 2024 general election, Naughton was re-elected to the Dáil. At the formation of the 35th government of Ireland in January 2025, Naughton was appointed as Minister of State at the Department of Children, Disability and Equality with responsibility for disability. She was also a super junior minister, one of four Ministers of State in attendance at cabinet, but without a vote.

On 18 November 2025, she was appointed to cabinet as Minister for Education and Youth.

Civic offices
Preceded by Michael Crowe	Mayor of Galway; 2011–2012	Succeeded by Terry O'Flaherty
Political offices
Preceded by Seán Canney as Minister of State at the Department of Communications, Climate Action and Environment	Minister of State at the Department of the Environment, Climate and Communications; 2020–2022; With: Ossian Smyth	Succeeded by Jack Chambers
Department reconfigured	Minister of State at the Department of Transport; 2020–2022	Succeeded by Jack Chambers
Preceded by Frank Feighan	Minister of State at the Department of Health; 2022–2024	Succeeded by Colm Burke
Preceded by Jack Chambers	Government Chief Whip; 2022–2025	Succeeded by Mary Butler
Preceded by Josepha Madigan	Minister of State at the Department of Education; 2024–2025	Succeeded by Michael Moynihan
Preceded by Anne Rabbitte	Minister of State at the Department of Children, Disability and Equality; Jan.–Nov. 2025	Succeeded by Emer Higgins
Preceded by Helen McEntee	Minister for Education and Youth; 2025–present	Incumbent

Dáil	Election	Deputy (Party)	Deputy (Party)	Deputy (Party)	Deputy (Party)	Deputy (Party)
9th	1937	Gerald Bartley (FF)	Joseph Mongan (FG)	Seán Tubridy (FF)	3 seats 1937–1977	
10th	1938	Gerald Bartley (FF)	Joseph Mongan (FG)	Seán Tubridy (FF)	3 seats 1937–1977	
10th	1940 by-election	Gerald Bartley (FF)	Joseph Mongan (FG)	John J. Keane (FF)	3 seats 1937–1977	
11th	1943	Gerald Bartley (FF)	Joseph Mongan (FG)	Eamon Corbett (FF)	3 seats 1937–1977	
12th	1944	Gerald Bartley (FF)	Joseph Mongan (FG)	Michael Lydon (FF)	3 seats 1937–1977	
13th	1948	Gerald Bartley (FF)	Joseph Mongan (FG)	Michael Lydon (FF)	3 seats 1937–1977	
14th	1951	Gerald Bartley (FF)	John Mannion Snr (FG)	Peadar Duignan (FF)	3 seats 1937–1977	
15th	1954	Gerald Bartley (FF)	Fintan Coogan Snr (FG)	Johnny Geoghegan (FF)	3 seats 1937–1977	
16th	1957	Gerald Bartley (FF)	Fintan Coogan Snr (FG)	Johnny Geoghegan (FF)	3 seats 1937–1977	
17th	1961	Gerald Bartley (FF)	Fintan Coogan Snr (FG)	Johnny Geoghegan (FF)	3 seats 1937–1977	
18th	1965	Bobby Molloy (FF)	Fintan Coogan Snr (FG)	Johnny Geoghegan (FF)	3 seats 1937–1977	
19th	1969	Bobby Molloy (FF)	Fintan Coogan Snr (FG)	Johnny Geoghegan (FF)	3 seats 1937–1977	
20th	1973	Bobby Molloy (FF)	Fintan Coogan Snr (FG)	Johnny Geoghegan (FF)	3 seats 1937–1977	
20th	1975 by-election	Bobby Molloy (FF)	Fintan Coogan Snr (FG)	Máire Geoghegan-Quinn (FF)	3 seats 1937–1977	
21st	1977	Bobby Molloy (FF)	John Mannion Jnr (FG)	Máire Geoghegan-Quinn (FF)	Bill Loughnane (FF)	4 seats 1977–1981
22nd	1981	Bobby Molloy (FF)	John Donnellan (FG)	Máire Geoghegan-Quinn (FF)	Mark Killilea Jnr (FF)	Michael D. Higgins (Lab)
23rd	1982 (Feb)	Bobby Molloy (FF)	John Donnellan (FG)	Máire Geoghegan-Quinn (FF)	Frank Fahey (FF)	Michael D. Higgins (Lab)
24th	1982 (Nov)	Bobby Molloy (FF)	John Donnellan (FG)	Máire Geoghegan-Quinn (FF)	Frank Fahey (FF)	Fintan Coogan Jnr (FG)
25th	1987	Bobby Molloy (PDs)	John Donnellan (FG)	Máire Geoghegan-Quinn (FF)	Frank Fahey (FF)	Michael D. Higgins (Lab)
26th	1989	Bobby Molloy (PDs)	Pádraic McCormack (FG)	Máire Geoghegan-Quinn (FF)	Frank Fahey (FF)	Michael D. Higgins (Lab)
27th	1992	Bobby Molloy (PDs)	Pádraic McCormack (FG)	Máire Geoghegan-Quinn (FF)	Éamon Ó Cuív (FF)	Michael D. Higgins (Lab)
28th	1997	Bobby Molloy (PDs)	Pádraic McCormack (FG)	Frank Fahey (FF)	Éamon Ó Cuív (FF)	Michael D. Higgins (Lab)
29th	2002	Noel Grealish (PDs)	Pádraic McCormack (FG)	Frank Fahey (FF)	Éamon Ó Cuív (FF)	Michael D. Higgins (Lab)
30th	2007	Noel Grealish (PDs)	Pádraic McCormack (FG)	Frank Fahey (FF)	Éamon Ó Cuív (FF)	Michael D. Higgins (Lab)
31st	2011	Noel Grealish (Ind.)	Brian Walsh (FG)	Seán Kyne (FG)	Éamon Ó Cuív (FF)	Derek Nolan (Lab)
32nd	2016	Noel Grealish (Ind.)	Hildegarde Naughton (FG)	Seán Kyne (FG)	Éamon Ó Cuív (FF)	Catherine Connolly (Ind.)
33rd	2020	Noel Grealish (Ind.)	Hildegarde Naughton (FG)	Mairéad Farrell (SF)	Éamon Ó Cuív (FF)	Catherine Connolly (Ind.)
34th	2024	Noel Grealish (Ind.)	Hildegarde Naughton (FG)	Mairéad Farrell (SF)	John Connolly (FF)	Catherine Connolly (Ind.)
34th	2026 by-election	Noel Grealish (Ind.)	Hildegarde Naughton (FG)	Mairéad Farrell (SF)	John Connolly (FF)	Seán Kyne (FG)
