= Jim Daly (politician) =

Irish former politician (born 1972

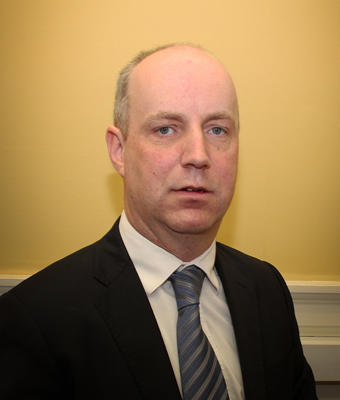
- Daly in 2016

Minister of State
- 2017–2020: Health

Teachta Dála
- In office February 2011 – February 2020
- Constituency: Cork South-West

Personal details
- Born: James Daly; 20 December 1972 (age 53) Drinagh, County Cork, Ireland
- Party: Fine Gael
- Spouse: Virge Daly (m. 2001)
- Children: 5
- Education: NUI Maynooth; Mary Immaculate College

Jim Daly (born 20 December 1972) is an Irish former Fine Gael politician who served as Minister of State for Mental Health and Older People from 2017 to 2020 and Chair of the Committee on Children and Youth Affairs from 2016 to 2017. He served as a Teachta Dála (TD) for the Cork South-West constituency from 2011 to 2020.

Prior to being elected to the Dáil, he was a member of Cork County Council for the Skibbereen local electoral area from 2004 to 2011. He ran unsuccessfully for the Seanad in 2007.

A native of Drinagh, County Cork, Daly is from a family of 11 children. He attended secondary school at Maria Immaculata, Dunmanway.

He studied at NUI Maynooth, and Mary Immaculate College, Limerick, becoming a primary school teacher and he was later Principal of Gaelscoil Dr Uí Shúilleabháin in Skibbereen.

After appearing on Tonight with Vincent Browne in 2012, Daly was diagnosed with skin cancer by a doctor watching at home.

He appeared on Claire Byrne Live on 22 January 2018, where he suggested a government issued ID should be a requirement for logging into social media websites.

On 20 September 2019, he announced that he would not contest the next general election. He is now the CEO of the Private Hospitals Association.

Dáil	Election	Deputy (Party)	Deputy (Party)	Deputy (Party)
17th	1961	Seán Collins (FG)	Michael Pat Murphy (Lab)	Edward Cotter (FF)
18th	1965	Seán Collins (FG)	Michael Pat Murphy (Lab)	Edward Cotter (FF)
19th	1969	John O'Sullivan (FG)	Michael Pat Murphy (Lab)	Flor Crowley (FF)
20th	1973	John O'Sullivan (FG)	Michael Pat Murphy (Lab)	Flor Crowley (FF)
21st	1977	Jim O'Keeffe (FG)	Michael Pat Murphy (Lab)	Joe Walsh (FF)
22nd	1981	Jim O'Keeffe (FG)	P. J. Sheehan (FG)	Flor Crowley (FF)
23rd	1982 (Feb)	Jim O'Keeffe (FG)	P. J. Sheehan (FG)	Joe Walsh (FF)
24th	1982 (Nov)	Jim O'Keeffe (FG)	P. J. Sheehan (FG)	Joe Walsh (FF)
25th	1987	Jim O'Keeffe (FG)	P. J. Sheehan (FG)	Joe Walsh (FF)
26th	1989	Jim O'Keeffe (FG)	P. J. Sheehan (FG)	Joe Walsh (FF)
27th	1992	Jim O'Keeffe (FG)	P. J. Sheehan (FG)	Joe Walsh (FF)
28th	1997	Jim O'Keeffe (FG)	P. J. Sheehan (FG)	Joe Walsh (FF)
29th	2002	Jim O'Keeffe (FG)	Denis O'Donovan (FF)	Joe Walsh (FF)
30th	2007	Jim O'Keeffe (FG)	P. J. Sheehan (FG)	Christy O'Sullivan (FF)
31st	2011	Jim Daly (FG)	Noel Harrington (FG)	Michael McCarthy (Lab)
32nd	2016	Jim Daly (FG)	Michael Collins (Ind.)	Margaret Murphy O'Mahony (FF)
33rd	2020	Holly Cairns (SD)	Michael Collins (Ind.)	Christopher O'Sullivan (FF)
34th	2024	Holly Cairns (SD)	Michael Collins (II)	Christopher O'Sullivan (FF)
