= Finian McGrath =

Irish former politician (born 1953)

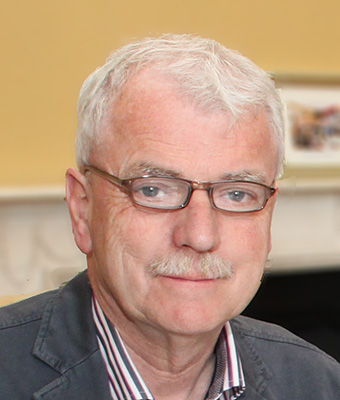
- McGrath in 2016

Minister of State
- 2016–2020: Disability Issues

Teachta Dála
- In office February 2016 – February 2020
- Constituency: Dublin Bay North
- In office May 2002 – February 2016
- Constituency: Dublin North-Central

Personal details
- Born: 9 April 1953 (age 73) Tuam, County Galway, Ireland
- Party: Independent
- Spouse: Anne Russell (m. 1982; died 2009)
- Children: 2
- Education: University College Dublin
- Website: finianmcgrath.ie

Finian McGrath (born 9 April 1953) is an Irish former independent politician who served as Minister of State for Disability Issues from 2016 to 2020. He served as a Teachta Dála (TD) from 2002 to 2020.

== Early and personal life ==
Born in Tuam, County Galway, in 1953. He was educated at University College Dublin. He went on to become a primary school principal at Scoil Plás Mhuire for Boys in Dublin, before entering politics. He had two daughters with his wife Anne, who died in November 2009. McGrath was a contestant on the You're a Star charity special in summer 2005, where he came in second. He released a charity single in December 2005, which featured the Christmas song "Angels We Have Heard on High" and the classic "Bad, Bad Leroy Brown". All proceeds from the sales of this single were donated to Down syndrome Ireland.

== Political career ==
He was an unsuccessful candidate in the Dublin North-Central constituency at the 1992 and 1997 general elections. He was elected to Dublin City Council in 1999, with the second-highest vote in the Clontarf local electoral area. He was first elected to Dáil Éireann at the 2002 general election, where he stood as an Independent Health Alliance candidate in the Dublin North-Central constituency. He joined the technical group, established to ensure Dáil speaking time for Independent TDs. In March 2003, due to being a dual mandate TD, he gave up his Dublin City Council seat to Ger Dorgan, who later was replaced by Fintan Cassidy, who failed to get elected in the subsequent 2004 local elections.

McGrath was re-elected to the 30th Dáil at the 2007 general election, confounding predictions that he would lose due to the loss of a seat from the constituency. He garnered a large number of transfers from the Sinn Féin and Labour Party candidates.

As an Independent member of the 30th Dáil, McGrath pledged his support for the new government formed in June 2007. In so doing, he secured a deal with Taoiseach Bertie Ahern, which he made public by entering it in the Dáil record. This public announcement was hailed by many observers who had criticised other Independent TDs such as Michael Lowry and Jackie Healy-Rae for keeping similar deals secret. On 20 October 2008, following the 2009 Budget, McGrath withdrew his support for the government in protest at the abolition of an automatic medical card for the over-70s, cuts in education and the increase of the pupil-teacher ratio. Following the election of Pearse Doherty to the Dáil, McGrath joined the Technical group, which consisted of the Sinn Féin deputies and the Independent Maureen O'Sullivan. He was re-elected at the 2011 general election, where he served as chair of the Technical group.

McGrath endorsed the Independent candidate Damien O'Farrell at the 2009 local elections for the Clontarf local electoral area in Dublin City Council, who was elected topping the poll.

During the 2011 presidential election, McGrath initially agreed to support Senator David Norris for nomination as a candidate. On 2 August, Norris publicly announced at a press conference that he was withdrawing from the presidential race. This followed the decision of McGrath, and the TDs John Halligan and Thomas Pringle to withdraw their support following revelations that Norris had written a letter to an Israeli court asking clemency for his former partner Ezra Nawi, who was then facing criminal charges. Sinn Féin proposed Martin McGuinness for their nomination for a presidential candidate. McGrath agreed, along with four other independent TDs, to sign McGuinness's nomination paper.

McGrath resigned as chair of the technical group in October 2012, after a dispute with Mick Wallace, over Wallace's participation in the loose alliance related to speaking rights in the Dáil. He joined the Independent Alliance at its inception in 2016. He contested the 2016 general election under that banner, in Dublin Bay North owing to the abolition of Dublin North-Central. He was re-elected to the Dáil and then entered talks on government formation. On 6 May 2016, he supported the nomination of Fine Gael leader Enda Kenny as Taoiseach, and was appointed by the new government as Minister of State for Disability Issues. He attended cabinet meetings, without a vote, making him a "Super Junior Minister". He was appointed to the same position by Leo Varadkar when he succeeded Kenny as Fine Gael leader and Taoiseach.

In January 2020, in advance of the 2020 general election, McGrath announced that he would not be seeking re-election, but would return to other forms of political activism to support people with disabilities. He continued in office as junior minister until the appointment of a new government in June 2020.

McGrath announced a run as an independent candidate in the 2024 European election in the Dublin constituency, but did not run.

== Political beliefs ==
Describing himself as "someone who comes from the tradition of Tone and Connolly", McGrath holds left-wing political views. He has cited health, education and disability as his policy priorities. He has also campaigned against the Iraq War and the U.S. military's use of Shannon Airport as a stopover, and on local environmental issues.

McGrath has spoken in support of Fidel Castro's socialist government in Cuba. When challenged on Cuba's supposed poor human rights record, McGrath replied that "Cuba has a different kind of democracy to Ireland."

Political offices
New office	Minister of State for Disability Issues; 2016–2020	Succeeded by Anne Rabbitte

Dáil	Election	Deputy (Party)	Deputy (Party)	Deputy (Party)	Deputy (Party)
13th	1948	Vivion de Valera (FF)	Martin O'Sullivan (Lab)	Patrick McGilligan (FG)	3 seats 1948–1961
14th	1951	Vivion de Valera (FF)	Colm Gallagher (FF)	Patrick McGilligan (FG)	3 seats 1948–1961
15th	1954	Vivion de Valera (FF)	Maureen O'Carroll (Lab)	Patrick McGilligan (FG)	3 seats 1948–1961
16th	1957	Vivion de Valera (FF)	Colm Gallagher (FF)	Patrick McGilligan (FG)	3 seats 1948–1961
16th	1957 by-election	Vivion de Valera (FF)	Frank Sherwin (Ind.)	Patrick McGilligan (FG)	3 seats 1948–1961
17th	1961	Vivion de Valera (FF)	Frank Sherwin (Ind.)	Patrick McGilligan (FG)	Celia Lynch (FF)
18th	1965	Vivion de Valera (FF)	Michael O'Leary (Lab)	Luke Belton (FG)	Celia Lynch (FF)
19th	1969	George Colley (FF)	Michael O'Leary (Lab)	Luke Belton (FG)	Celia Lynch (FF)
20th	1973	George Colley (FF)	Michael O'Leary (Lab)	Luke Belton (FG)	Celia Lynch (FF)
21st	1977	Vincent Brady (FF)	Michael O'Leary (Lab)	Michael Keating (FG)	3 seats 1977–1981
22nd	1981	Vincent Brady (FF)	Charles Haughey (FF)	Noël Browne (SLP)	George Birmingham (FG)
23rd	1982 (Feb)	Vincent Brady (FF)	Charles Haughey (FF)	Richard Bruton (FG)	George Birmingham (FG)
24th	1982 (Nov)	Vincent Brady (FF)	Charles Haughey (FF)	Richard Bruton (FG)	George Birmingham (FG)
25th	1987	Vincent Brady (FF)	Charles Haughey (FF)	Richard Bruton (FG)	George Birmingham (FG)
26th	1989	Vincent Brady (FF)	Charles Haughey (FF)	Richard Bruton (FG)	Ivor Callely (FF)
27th	1992	Seán Haughey (FF)	Derek McDowell (Lab)	Richard Bruton (FG)	Ivor Callely (FF)
28th	1997	Seán Haughey (FF)	Derek McDowell (Lab)	Richard Bruton (FG)	Ivor Callely (FF)
29th	2002	Seán Haughey (FF)	Finian McGrath (Ind.)	Richard Bruton (FG)	Ivor Callely (FF)
30th	2007	Seán Haughey (FF)	Finian McGrath (Ind.)	Richard Bruton (FG)	3 seats from 2007
31st	2011	Aodhán Ó Ríordáin (Lab)	Finian McGrath (Ind.)	Richard Bruton (FG)	3 seats from 2007
32nd	2016	Constituency abolished. See Dublin Bay North			

Dáil	Election	Deputy (Party)	Deputy (Party)	Deputy (Party)	Deputy (Party)	Deputy (Party)
32nd	2016	Denise Mitchell (SF)	Tommy Broughan (I4C)	Finian McGrath (Ind.)	Seán Haughey (FF)	Richard Bruton (FG)
33rd	2020	Denise Mitchell (SF)	Cian O'Callaghan (SD)	Aodhán Ó Ríordáin (Lab)	Seán Haughey (FF)	Richard Bruton (FG)
34th	2024	Denise Mitchell (SF)	Cian O'Callaghan (SD)	Barry Heneghan (Ind.)	Tom Brabazon (FF)	Naoise Ó Muirí (FG)
