= Government of the 30th Dáil =

Governments of Ireland 2007 to 2011

There were two governments of the 30th Dáil, which was elected at the 2007 general election on 24 May 2007. The 27th government of Ireland (14 June 2007 – 7 May 2008) was led by Bertie Ahern as Taoiseach and lasted 328 days. The 28th government of Ireland (7 May 2008 – 9 March 2011) was led by Brian Cowen as Taoiseach and lasted 2 years, 306 days. The governments were formed as coalition governments of Fianna Fáil, the Green Party and the Progressive Democrats. The Progressive Democrats disbanded in November 2009 and Mary Harney continued as an Independent member of the government until 20 January 2011. The Green Party left government on 23 January 2011.

== 27th government of Ireland ==
27th government of Ireland
- Government of Ireland

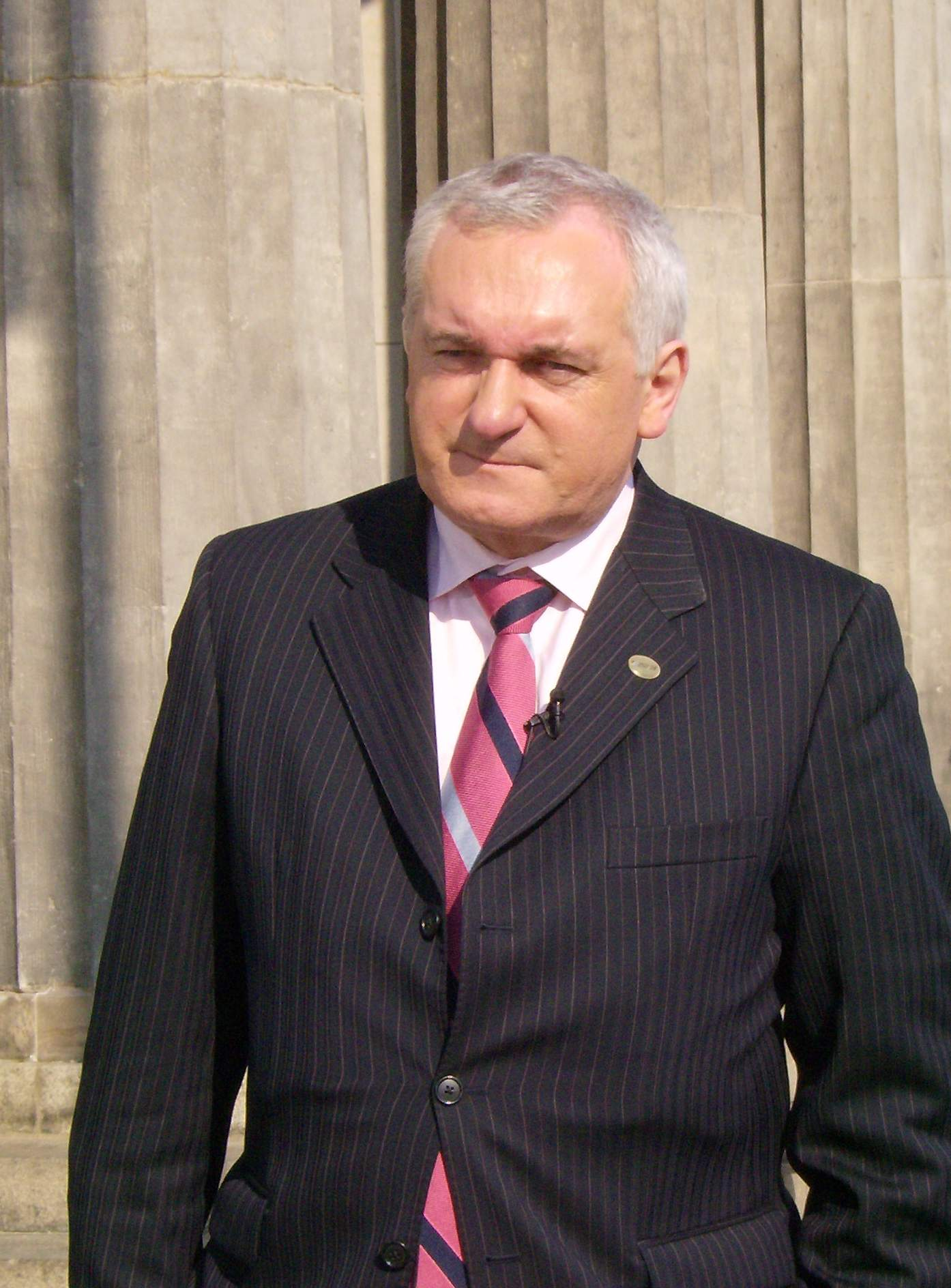
- Date formed: 14 June 2007
- Date dissolved: 7 May 2008

People and organisations
- President: Mary McAleese
- Taoiseach: Bertie Ahern
- Tánaiste: Brian Cowen
- Total no. of members: 15
- Member parties: Fianna Fáil; Greens; Progressive Democrats
- Status in legislature: Minority coalition
- Opposition party: Fine Gael
- Opposition leader: Enda Kenny

History
- Election: 2007 general election
- Legislature terms: 30th Dáil; 23rd Seanad
- Predecessor: 26th government
- Successor: 28th government

The 27th government of Ireland was composed of Fianna Fáil, the Green Party and the Progressive Democrats. It was also supported by four independent TDs: Beverley Flynn, Jackie Healy-Rae, Michael Lowry and Finian McGrath. Flynn later rejoined the Fianna Fáil parliamentary party in April 2008.

=== Nomination of Taoiseach ===
The 30th Dáil first met on 14 June. In the debate on the nomination of Taoisech, both outgoing Taoiseach and Fianna Fáil leader Bertie Ahern and Fine Gael leader Enda Kenny were proposed. Ahern received the nomination of the Dáil. Ahern was re-appointed as Taoiseach by President Mary McAleese.

14 June 2007; Nomination of Bertie Ahern (FF) as Taoiseach; Motion proposed by Brian Cowen and seconded by Trevor Sargent; Absolute majority: 84/166
Vote	Parties	Votes
Yes	Fianna Fáil (77), Green Party (6), Independent (4), Progressive Democrats (2)	89 / 166
No	Fine Gael (51), Labour Party (20), Sinn Féin (4), Independent (1)	76 / 166
Not voting	Ceann Comhairle (1)	1 / 166

=== Government ministers ===
After his appointment by the president, Bertie Ahern proposed the members of the government and they were approved by the Dáil. They were appointed by the president on the same day.

Office	Name	Party
Taoiseach	Bertie Ahern	Fianna Fáil
Tánaiste	Brian Cowen	Fianna Fáil
Minister for Finance	Brian Cowen	Fianna Fáil
Minister for Health and Children	Mary Harney	Progressive Democrats
Minister for Transport	Noel Dempsey	Fianna Fáil
Minister for Foreign Affairs	Dermot Ahern	Fianna Fáil
Minister for Enterprise, Trade and Employment	Micheál Martin	Fianna Fáil
Minister for Arts, Sport and Tourism	Séamus Brennan	Fianna Fáil
Minister for Social and Family Affairs	Martin Cullen	Fianna Fáil
Minister for Community, Rural and Gaeltacht Affairs	Éamon Ó Cuív	Fianna Fáil
Minister for Agriculture, Fisheries and Food (Note: The Department of Agriculture and Food was renamed the Department of Agriculture, Food and the Marine on 20 October 2007.)	Mary Coughlan	Fianna Fáil
Minister for Education and Science	Mary Hanafin	Fianna Fáil
Minister for Defence	Willie O'Dea	Fianna Fáil
Minister for Justice, Equality and Law Reform	Brian Lenihan	Fianna Fáil
Minister for Communications, Energy and Natural Resources (Note: The Department of Communications, Marine and Natural Resources was renamed the Department of Communications, Energy and Natural Resources on 20 October 2007.)	Eamon Ryan	Green Party
Minister for the Environment, Heritage and Local Government	John Gormley	Green Party

Changes to Departments

=== Attorney General ===
On 14 June 2007, Paul Gallagher was appointed by the president as Attorney General on the nomination of the Taoiseach.

=== Ministers of state ===
On 14 June 2007, Ahern announced to the Dáil that the government on his nomination would re-appoint Tom Kitt, TD to the post of Minister for State at the Department of the Taoiseach with special responsibility as Government Chief Whip and Minister of State at the Department of Defence, and would appoint Dick Roche, TD to the position of Minister of State at the Department of Foreign Affairs, with special responsibility for European Affairs. On 20 June 2007, the Taoiseach announced the government had appointed of a further 15 Ministers of State on his nomination, as well as the names of three Ministers of State the government would appoint on his nomination after the passage of the Ministers and Secretaries (Ministers of State) Act 2007. This legislation increased the number of Ministers of State from 17 to 20 and was enacted on 9 July 2007. Kitt and Brendan Smith attended meetings of the cabinet.

Name	Department(s)	Responsibility	Party
Tom Kitt; In attendance at cabinet	Taoiseach; Defence	Government Chief Whip; Defence	Fianna Fáil
Brendan Smith; In attendance at cabinet	Health and Children; Justice, Equality and Law Reform; Education and Science	Children	Fianna Fáil
Dick Roche	Foreign Affairs	European Affairs	Fianna Fáil
Michael Kitt	Foreign Affairs	Overseas Development	Fianna Fáil
Seán Haughey	Education and Science; Enterprise, Trade and Employment	Lifelong Learning, Youth Work and School Transport	Fianna Fáil
Billy Kelleher	Enterprise, Trade and Employment	Labour Affairs	Fianna Fáil
Trevor Sargent	Agriculture, Fisheries and Food	Food and Horticulture	Green
Noel Ahern	Finance	Office of Public Works	Fianna Fáil
Tony Killeen	Environment, Heritage and Local Government; Communications, Energy and Natural Resources	Environment and Energy	Fianna Fáil
Mary Wallace	Agriculture, Fisheries and Food	Forestry	Fianna Fáil
Batt O'Keeffe	Environment, Heritage and Local Government	Housing, Urban Renewal and Developing Areas	Fianna Fáil
Pat Carey	Community, Rural and Gaeltacht Affairs	Drugs Strategy and Community Affairs	Fianna Fáil
Conor Lenihan	Community, Rural and Gaeltacht Affairs; Education and Science; Justice, Equality and Law Reform	Integration Policy	Fianna Fáil
Michael Ahern	Education and Science; Enterprise, Trade and Employment	Innovation Policy	Fianna Fáil
Pat "the Cope" Gallagher	Health and Children	Health Promotion and Food Safety	Fianna Fáil
Seán Power	Justice, Equality and Law Reform	Equality Issues	Fianna Fáil
John Browne	Agriculture, Fisheries and Food	Fisheries	Fianna Fáil
==== Appointments after 9 July 2007 ==== Following the increase in the number of Ministers of State.
Name	Department(s)	Responsibility	Party
John McGuinness	Enterprise, Trade and Employment	Trade and Commerce	Fianna Fáil
Jimmy Devins	Health and Children; Education and Science; Enterprise, Trade and Employment; Justice, Equality and Law Reform	Disability Issues and Mental Health	Fianna Fáil
Máire Hoctor	Health and Children; Social and Family Affairs; Environment, Heritage and Local Government	Older People	Fianna Fáil

=== Confidence in the Government ===
On 26 September 2007, a motion of confidence in the Taoiseach and the government proposed by Taoiseach Bertie Ahern was approved with 81 votes in favour and 76 against.

On 28 November 2007, a motion of no confidence in the Minister for Health and Children Mary Harney was proposed by Jan O'Sullivan for the Labour Party. The motion was amended by the Minister, and the amended motion (now a vote of confidence) was carried, with 83 votes in favour to 73 votes against.

=== Resignation ===
On 2 April 2008, Bertie Ahern announced his intention to resign as leader of Fianna Fáil. On 9 April, Brian Cowen was elected unopposed to succeed him. On 6 May, Ahern resigned as Taoiseach.

== 28th government of Ireland ==
28th government of Ireland
- Government of Ireland

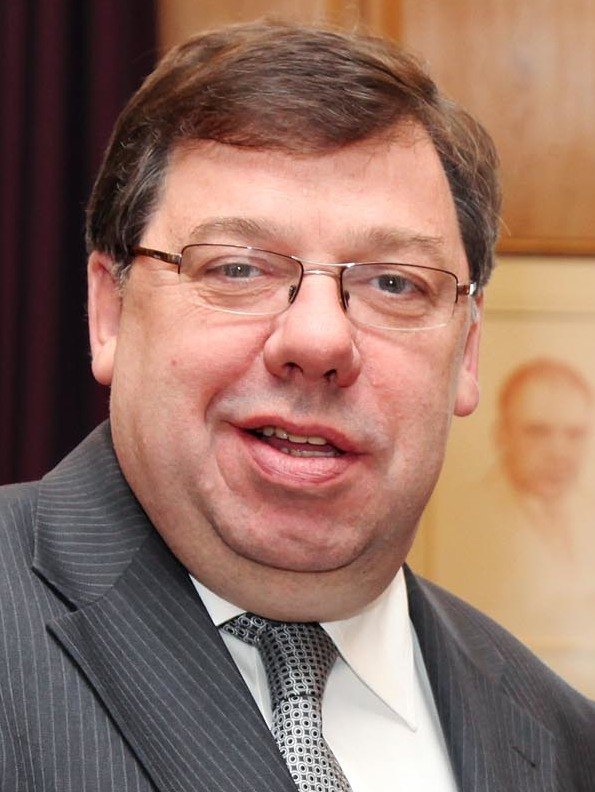
- Date formed: 7 May 2008
- Date dissolved: 9 March 2011

People and organisations
- President: Mary McAleese
- Taoiseach: Brian Cowen
- Tánaiste: Mary Coughlan
- Total no. of members: 15
- Member parties: Fianna Fáil; Green Party; Progressive Democrats
- Status in legislature: Coalition
- Opposition cabinet: Second Kenny front bench
- Opposition party: Fine Gael
- Opposition leader: Enda Kenny

History
- Legislature terms: 30th Dáil; 23rd Seanad
- Budgets: 2009; 2010; 2011
- Predecessor: 27th government
- Successor: 29th government

The 28th government of Ireland was formed on 7 May 2008 following the resignation the previous day of Bertie Ahern as Taoiseach. The new Fianna Fáil leader Brian Cowen was nominated by the Dáil as Ireland's 12th head of government. It was initially composed of Fianna Fáil, the Green Party, the Progressive Democrats and supported by independent TDs Jackie Healy-Rae, Michael Lowry and Finian McGrath. McGrath later withdrew his support in October 2008.

Following the disbandment of the Progressive Democrats in 2009, it became a coalition of Fianna Fáil, the Green Party and Mary Harney, continuing as an Independent minister.

A cabinet reshuffle took place on 23 March 2010, following the resignations of Willie O'Dea and Martin Cullen. After the resignations of six ministers in January 2011, the vacant portfolios were reassigned to other ministers; with the subsequent resignation of Brian Cowen as leader of Fianna Fáil on 22 January 2011, the Green Party withdrew their support from the government.

The government was dominated by responses to the economic downturn, culminating in a troika of the EU/ECB/IMF troika directing the government's financial decisions in November 2010.

=== Nomination of Taoiseach ===
On 7 May 2008, following the resignation of Bertie Ahern as Taoiseach, Fianna Fáil leader Brian Cowen, Fine Gael leader Enda Kenny and Labour Party leader Eamon Gilmore were each proposed to be nominated by Dáil Éireann for the position of Taoiseach. Cowen received the nomination of the Dáil. Cowen was appointed as Taoiseach by President Mary McAleese.

7 May 2008; Nomination of Brian Cowen (FF) as Taoiseach; Motion proposed by Bertie Ahern and seconded by John Gormley; Absolute majority: 84/166
Vote	Parties	Votes
Yes	Fianna Fáil (76), Green Party (6), Independent (4), Progressive Democrats (2)	88 / 166
No	Fine Gael (51), Labour Party (20), Sinn Féin (4), Independent (1)	76 / 166
Absent or Not voting	Ceann Comhairle (1), Fianna Fáil (1)	2 / 166

=== Government ministers ===
After his appointment by the president, Brian Cowen proposed the members of the government and they were approved by the Dáil. They were appointed by the president on the same day.

Office	Name	Term	Party
Taoiseach	Brian Cowen	2008–2011	Fianna Fáil
Tánaiste	Mary Coughlan	2008–2011	Fianna Fáil
Minister for Enterprise, Trade and Employment	Mary Coughlan	2008–2010	Fianna Fáil
Minister for Finance	Brian Lenihan	2008–2011	Fianna Fáil
Minister for Health and Children	Mary Harney	2008–2011	Independent
Minister for Transport	Noel Dempsey	2008–2011	Fianna Fáil
Minister for Justice, Equality and Law Reform (Note: The Department of Justice, Equality and Law Reform was renamed the Department of Justice and Law Reform on 2 June 2010.)	Dermot Ahern	2008–2011	Fianna Fáil
Minister for Foreign Affairs	Micheál Martin	2008–2011	Fianna Fáil
Minister for Arts, Sport and Tourism	Martin Cullen	2008–2010	Fianna Fáil
Minister for Community, Rural and Gaeltacht Affairs	Éamon Ó Cuív	2008–2010	Fianna Fáil
Minister for Social and Family Affairs	Mary Hanafin	2008–2010	Fianna Fáil
Minister for Defence	Willie O'Dea	2008–2010	Fianna Fáil
Minister for the Environment, Heritage and Local Government	John Gormley	2008–2011	Green
Minister for Communications, Energy and Natural Resources	Eamon Ryan	2008–2011	Green
Minister for Agriculture, Fisheries and Food	Brendan Smith	2008–2011	Fianna Fáil
Minister for Education and Science	Batt O'Keeffe	2008–2010	Fianna Fáil
==== Changes 23 March 2010 ==== Resignation of Willie O'Dea on 18 February and Martin Cullen on 23 March
Office	Name	Term	Party
Minister for Education and Skills (Note: The Department of Education and Science was renamed the Department of Education and Skills on 2 May 2010.)	Mary Coughlan	2010–2011	Fianna Fáil
Minister for Social Protection (Note: The Department of Social and Family Affairs was renamed the Department of Social Protection on 2 May 2010.)	Éamon Ó Cuív	2010–2011	Fianna Fáil
Minister for Tourism, Culture and Sport (Note: The Department of Arts, Sport and Tourism was renamed the Department of Tourism, Culture and Sport on 2 May 2010.)	Mary Hanafin	2010–2011	Fianna Fáil
Minister for Enterprise, Trade and Innovation (Note: The Department of Enterprise, Trade and Employment was renamed the Department of Enterprise, Trade and Innovation on 2 May 2010.)	Batt O'Keeffe	2010–2011	Fianna Fáil
Minister for Community, Equality and Gaeltacht Affairs (Note: The Department of Community, Rural and Gaeltacht Affairs was renamed the Department of Community, Equality and Gaeltacht Affairs on 2 June 2010.)	Pat Carey	2010–2011	Fianna Fáil
Minister for Defence	Tony Killeen	2010–2011	Fianna Fáil
==== Change 19 January 2011 ==== Resignation of Mícheál Martin.
Office	Name	Term	Party
Minister for Foreign Affairs	Brian Cowen	2011	Fianna Fáil
==== Changes 20 January 2011 ==== Resignation of Mary Harney, Noel Dempsey, Dermot Ahern, Batt O'Keeffe and Tony Killeen.
Office	Name	Term	Party
Minister for Defence	Éamon Ó Cuív	2011	Fianna Fáil
Minister for Enterprise, Trade and Innovation	Mary Hanafin	2011	Fianna Fáil
Minister for Health and Children	Mary Coughlan	2011	Fianna Fáil
Minister for Justice and Law Reform	Brendan Smith	2011	Fianna Fáil
Minister for Transport	Pat Carey	2011	Fianna Fáil
==== Changes 23 January 2011 ==== Resignation of Green Party ministers John Gormley and Eamon Ryan.
Office	Name	Term	Party
Minister for Communications, Energy and Natural Resources	Pat Carey	2011	Fianna Fáil
Minister for the Environment, Heritage and Local Government	Éamon Ó Cuív	2011	Fianna Fáil

Changes to departments

=== Attorney General ===
On 7 May 2008, Paul Gallagher was appointed by the president as Attorney General on the nomination of the Taoiseach.

=== Ministers of state ===
On 7 May 2008, Cowen announced that the government would on his nomination appoint Pat Carey, Barry Andrews, Trevor Sargent, and Dick Roche as ministers of state. Carey and Andrews would attend meetings of the cabinet. On 13 May 2008, Cowen announced the appointment by the government on his nomination of 16 further ministers of state.

Name	Department(s)	Responsibility	Party
Pat Carey; In attendance at cabinet	Taoiseach; Defence	Government Chief Whip; Active Citizenship	Fianna Fáil
Barry Andrews; In attendance at cabinet	Health and Children; Education and Science; Justice, Equality and Law Reform	Children and Youth Affairs	Fianna Fáil
Dick Roche	Taoiseach; Foreign Affairs	European Affairs	Fianna Fáil
Trevor Sargent	Agriculture, Fisheries and Food	Food and Horticulture	Green
Noel Ahern	Transport	Road Safety	Fianna Fáil
Seán Power	Communications, Energy and Natural Resources	Information Society and Natural Resources	Fianna Fáil
Tony Killeen	Agriculture, Fisheries and Food	Fisheries and Forestry	Fianna Fáil
Conor Lenihan	Community, Rural and Gaeltacht Affairs; Education and Science; Justice, Equality and Law Reform	Integration Policy	Fianna Fáil
Mary Wallace	Health and Children	Health Promotion and Food Safety	Fianna Fáil
Seán Haughey	Education and Science; Enterprise, Trade and Employment	Lifelong Learning and School Transport	Fianna Fáil
Michael Kitt	Environment, Heritage and Local Government	Local Services	Fianna Fáil
Billy Kelleher	Enterprise, Trade and Employment	Labour Affairs	Fianna Fáil
John McGuinness	Enterprise, Trade and Employment	Trade and Commerce	Fianna Fáil
Jimmy Devins	Education and Science; Enterprise, Trade and Employment	Science, Technology and Innovation	Fianna Fáil
Máire Hoctor	Health and Children; Social and Family Affairs; Environment, Heritage and Local Government	Older People	Fianna Fáil
John Moloney	Health and Children; Education and Science; Enterprise, Trade and Employment; Justice, Equality and Law Reform	Equality, Disability Issues and Mental Health	Fianna Fáil
Michael Finneran	Environment, Heritage and Local Government	Housing, Urban Renewal and Developing Areas	Fianna Fáil
John Curran	Community, Rural and Gaeltacht Affairs	Drugs Strategy and Community Affairs	Fianna Fáil
Peter Power	Foreign Affairs	Overseas Development	Fianna Fáil
Martin Mansergh	Finance; Arts, Sport and Tourism	Office of Public Works; Arts	Fianna Fáil
==== Changes 22 April 2009 ==== On 22 April 2009, Taoiseach Brian Cowen sought the resignation of all 20 ministers of state. He then nominated a reduced number of 15 ministers of state for appointment by the government as part of cost-cutting measures due to the Irish financial crisis. These included 13 of the outgoing ministers, as well as two new appointments, Dara Calleary and Áine Brady. Those not reappointed were Noel Ahern, John McGuinness, Michael Kitt, Seán Power, Máire Hoctor, Mary Wallace and Jimmy Devins.
Name	Department(s)	Responsibility	Party
Pat Carey; In attendance at cabinet	Taoiseach; Defence	Government Chief Whip; Active Citizenship	Fianna Fáil
Barry Andrews; In attendance at cabinet	Health and Children; Education and Science; Justice, Equality and Law Reform	Children and Young People	Fianna Fáil
Dick Roche	Taoiseach; Foreign Affairs	European Affairs	Fianna Fáil
Trevor Sargent	Agriculture, Fisheries and Food; Health and Children	Food and Horticulture	Green
Tony Killeen	Agriculture, Fisheries and Food	Fisheries and Forestry	Fianna Fáil
Conor Lenihan	Enterprise, Trade and Employment; Education and Science; Communications, Energy and Natural Resources	Science, Technology, Innovation and Natural Resources	Fianna Fáil
Seán Haughey	Education and Science; Enterprise, Trade and Employment	Lifelong Learning and School Transport	Fianna Fáil
Billy Kelleher	Enterprise, Trade and Employment	Trade and Commerce	Fianna Fáil
John Moloney	Health and Children; Education and Science; Enterprise, Trade and Employment; Justice, Equality and Law Reform	Equality, Disability Issues and Mental Health	Fianna Fáil
Michael Finneran	Environment, Heritage and Local Government	Housing and Local Services	Fianna Fáil
John Curran	Community, Rural and Gaeltacht Affairs; Education and Science; Justice, Equality and Law Reform	Drugs Strategy and Community Affairs	Fianna Fáil
Peter Power	Foreign Affairs	Overseas Development	Fianna Fáil
Martin Mansergh	Finance; Arts, Sport and Tourism	Office of Public Works; Arts	Fianna Fáil
Áine Brady	Health and Children; Social and Family Affairs; Environment, Heritage and Local Government	Older People and Health Promotion	Fianna Fáil
Dara Calleary	Enterprise, Trade and Employment	Labour Affairs	Fianna Fáil
==== Changes 23 March 2010 ==== Following the resignation of Trevor Sargent on 23 February 2010, and the appointment of Carey and Killeen to government.
Name	Department(s)	Responsibility	Party
John Curran; In attendance at cabinet	Taoiseach; Defence	Government Chief Whip; Active Citizenship	Fianna Fáil
John Moloney	Health and Children; Education and Skills; Enterprise, Trade and Innovation; Justice and Law Reform	Disability Issues and Mental Health	Fianna Fáil
Dara Calleary	Taoiseach; Finance; Enterprise, Trade and Innovation	Public Service Transformation and Labour Affairs	Fianna Fáil
Ciarán Cuffe	Agriculture, Fisheries and Food; Transport; Environment, Heritage and Local Government	Horticulture, Sustainable Travel and Planning; and Heritage	Green
Seán Connick	Agriculture, Fisheries and Food	Fisheries and Forestry	Fianna Fáil
Mary White	Justice and Law Reform; Community, Equality and Gaeltacht Affairs; Education and Skills	Equality and Human Rights; and Integration	Green
==== Changes 23 January 2011 ==== Ciarán Cuffe and Mary White resigned on 23 January 2011 after the Green Party withdrew from government.

=== Constitutional referendums ===
On 12 June 2008, a referendum was held on the approval of the Treaty of Lisbon. This was defeated, by a margin of 46.6% to 53.4%. On 15 October 2009, a second referendum was held on its approval, which was approved by 67.1% to 32.9%.

=== Budgets ===
The Minister for Finance, Brian Lenihan, delivered the following budgets:

- 2009 budget, on 14 October 2008
- 2009 emergency budget, on 7 April 2009
- 2010 Irish budget, on 9 December 2009
- 2011 Irish budget, on 7 December 2010

=== Motions of confidence ===
On 10 June 2009, a motion of confidence in the government proposed by Taoiseach Brian Cowen was approved with 85 votes in favour and 79 against.

On 17 February 2010, a motion of confidence in Minister for Defence Willie O'Dea proposed by Taoiseach Brian Cowen was approved with 80 votes in favour and 69 against. Nevertheless, Willie O'Dea did resign the following day.

On 15 June 2010, a motion of confidence in the Taoiseach and the government by Taoiseach Brian Cowen was approved with 82 votes in favour and 77 against.

=== Dissolution ===
On 1 February, the president dissolved the Dáil on the advice of the Taoiseach and a general election was held on 25 February 2011.
