= Frank Fahey (politician) =

Irish former politician (born 1951)

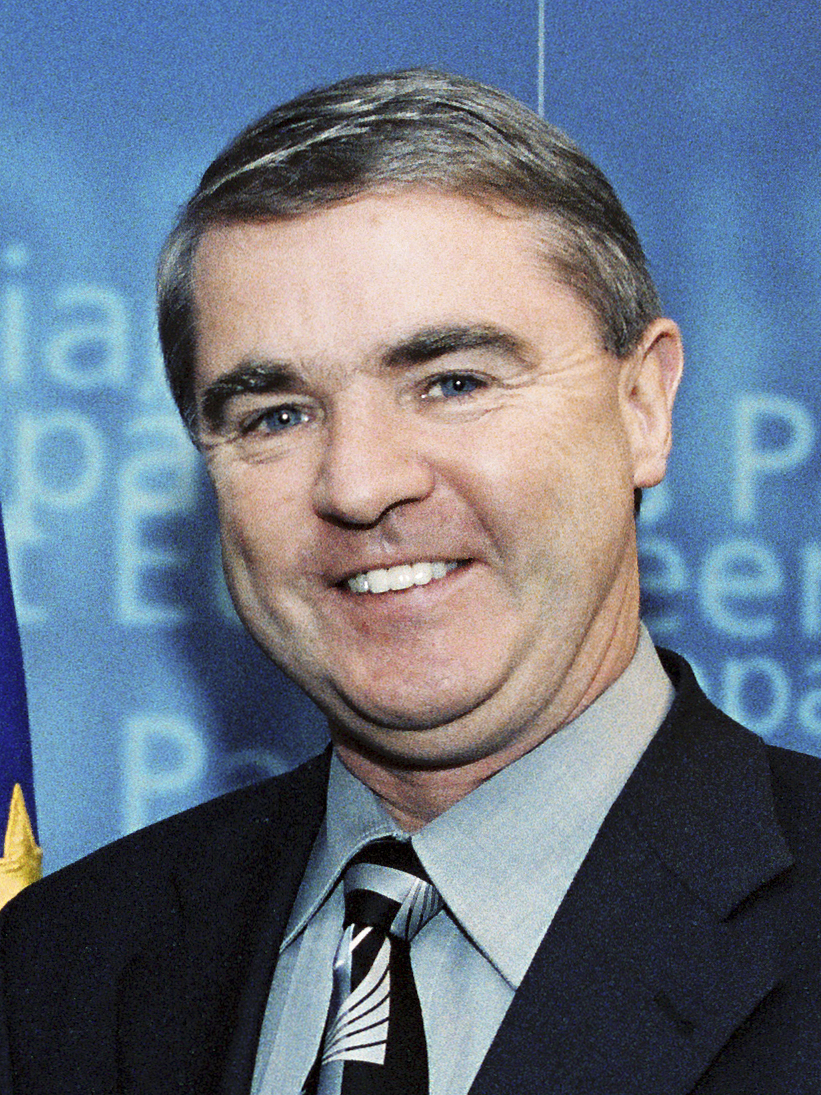
- Fahey in 2003

Minister of State
- 2004–2007: Justice, Equality and Law Reform
- 2002–2004: Enterprise, Trade and Employment
- 1997–2000: Children
- 1998–2000: Justice, Equality and Law Reform
- 1998–2000: Education and Science
- 1997–2000: Health and Children
- 1991–1992: Tourism, Transport and Communications
- 1989–1991: Tourism and Transport
- 1987–1992: Education

Minister for the Marine and Natural Resources
- In office 27 January 2000 – 6 June 2002
- Taoiseach: Bertie Ahern
- Preceded by: Michael Woods
- Succeeded by: Dermot Ahern

Teachta Dála
- In office June 1997 – February 2011
- In office February 1982 – November 1992
- Constituency: Galway West

Senator
- In office 17 February 1993 – 6 June 1997
- Constituency: Labour Panel

Personal details
- Born: 6 June 1951 (age 75) Galway, Ireland
- Party: Fianna Fáil
- Education: University College Galway

Frank Fahey (born 6 June 1951) is an Irish property developer and former Fianna Fáil politician who served as Minister for the Marine and Natural Resources from 2000 to 2002 and as a Minister of State in various roles. He served as a Teachta Dála (TD) for the Galway West constituency from 1982 to 1992 and 1997 to 2011. He was a Senator for the Labour Panel from 1993 to 1997.

== Life before politics ==
Frank Fahey was born in June 1951 in Galway. He was educated at St Mary's College, Our Lady's College and University College Galway. He was a schoolteacher before he entered politics.

== Ministerial career ==
Fahey was first elected to Dáil Éireann at the February 1982 general election. In 1987, he was appointed by the government of Charles Haughey to the post of Minister of State at the Department of Education with responsibility for Youth and Sport. He was re-appointed in July 1989, with additional responsibility as Minister of State at the Department of Tourism and Transport from September 1989. He was not retained as a minister when Albert Reynolds came to office in February 1992.

He lost his Dáil seat at the 1992 general election and was appointed to Seanad Éireann, serving in the 20th Seanad until 1997. He returned to the Dáil at the 1997 general election and in the new government of Bertie Ahern, he was appointed Minister of State at the Department of Health and Children with responsibility as Minister of State for Children. The role was expanded in 1998 with additional appointments as Minister of State at the Department of Education and Science and at the Department of Justice, Equality and Law Reform. In January 2000, he was appointed to cabinet as Minister for the Marine and Natural Resources.

Following the re-election of the incumbent government at the 2002 general election, Fahey was demoted to the post of Minister of State at the Department of Enterprise, Trade and Employment with responsibility for Labour Affairs. In a reshuffle in 2004, he was appointed as Minister of State at the Department of Justice, Equality and Law Reform with responsibility for Equality.

He was re-elected at the 2007 general election but not appointed to any ministerial office. He was, however, appointed to head the joint Oireachtas committee on Transport.

== Controversies ==
=== Lost at Sea scheme ===
While Minister for the Marine and Natural Resources in 2000, Fahey launched the Lost at Sea scheme to compensate fishermen whose vessels had been lost at sea. In 2004, following a complaint from a late applicant (who had been turned down), the Ombudsman Emily O'Reilly recommended to the department that latecomers should be considered, saying that the schemes had a "serious defect" in having contacted some fishing families and not others. Via a freedom of information request, The Sunday Business Post found that Fahey had discussed the scheme with two constituents, who later received three quarters (around €2m) of the overall compensation, prior to the announcement - and had written to them about their successful applications prior to the closing date. In 2007, the Standards in Public Office Commission found no problems with Fahey's conduct. In 2009, the Ombudsman published a full report into the scheme, again recommending that late applicants receive compensation, but it was blocked from discussion in the Oireachtas by the government.

=== Corrib gas project ===
In 2000, one of Fahey's last acts as Minister of State for the Marine and Natural Resources was to approve the foreshore licence for the controversial Corrib gas project. In 2002, in connection with this project, he approved the sale of a large area of Irish national forestry at Bellanaboy to Shell Oil for the building of a gas processing site, which caused much controversy.

== Investments and property ==
The Irish Times reported in 2006 that in 1994, when Fahey was a senator, he became involved in establishing a hair and beauty salon business in Moscow, involving an investment of over £200,000 (€254,000). Fahey did not officially declare the interest and at first denied involvement with the salon. Later, he admitted a connection, saying he had travelled to Moscow "as an ordinary citizen to support the investors including my wife who were attempting to set up a hair salon there...the whole thing was part of a regional political campaign by a number of individuals to do damage to my integrity, character and good name".

Fahey has invested in properties in countries including Ireland, France, the US, Dubai and Belgium. He also declared an interest in a construction company and a share portfolio in the Dáil Register of Members Interests.

In June 2009, Green Party leader Trevor Sargent accused Fahey in the Dáil of tax avoidance and making inappropriate decisions as a minister, and called on the Taoiseach to sack him.

== Loss of seat ==
The 2011 general election was disastrous for Fianna Fáil and Fahey lost his seat, his first preference vote declining to 5.7%. He had said in November 2010: "I have no illusions that I will lose my seat". During a public meeting in the run up to the election he and government advisor Alan Aherne were booed and heckled.

Political offices
Preceded by Enda Kenny	Minister of State at the Department of Education; 1987–1992	Succeeded by Liam Aylward
Preceded by Denis Lyons	Minister of State at the Department of Tourism and Transport; 1989–1992	Succeeded by Denis Lyons
Preceded by Austin Currie	Minister of State for Children; 1997–2000	Succeeded by Mary Hanafin
Preceded by Michael Woods	Minister for the Marine and Natural Resources; 2000–2002	Succeeded by Dermot Ahern
Preceded by Tom Kitt; Noel Treacy	Minister of State at the Department of Enterprise, Trade and Employment; 2002–2004; With: Michael Ahern	Succeeded by Tony Killeen; Michael Ahern
Preceded by Willie O'Dea	Minister of State at the Department of Justice, Equality and Law Reform; 2004–2007	Succeeded by Seán Power

Dáil	Election	Deputy (Party)	Deputy (Party)	Deputy (Party)	Deputy (Party)	Deputy (Party)
9th	1937	Gerald Bartley (FF)	Joseph Mongan (FG)	Seán Tubridy (FF)	3 seats 1937–1977	
10th	1938	Gerald Bartley (FF)	Joseph Mongan (FG)	Seán Tubridy (FF)	3 seats 1937–1977	
10th	1940 by-election	Gerald Bartley (FF)	Joseph Mongan (FG)	John J. Keane (FF)	3 seats 1937–1977	
11th	1943	Gerald Bartley (FF)	Joseph Mongan (FG)	Eamon Corbett (FF)	3 seats 1937–1977	
12th	1944	Gerald Bartley (FF)	Joseph Mongan (FG)	Michael Lydon (FF)	3 seats 1937–1977	
13th	1948	Gerald Bartley (FF)	Joseph Mongan (FG)	Michael Lydon (FF)	3 seats 1937–1977	
14th	1951	Gerald Bartley (FF)	John Mannion Snr (FG)	Peadar Duignan (FF)	3 seats 1937–1977	
15th	1954	Gerald Bartley (FF)	Fintan Coogan Snr (FG)	Johnny Geoghegan (FF)	3 seats 1937–1977	
16th	1957	Gerald Bartley (FF)	Fintan Coogan Snr (FG)	Johnny Geoghegan (FF)	3 seats 1937–1977	
17th	1961	Gerald Bartley (FF)	Fintan Coogan Snr (FG)	Johnny Geoghegan (FF)	3 seats 1937–1977	
18th	1965	Bobby Molloy (FF)	Fintan Coogan Snr (FG)	Johnny Geoghegan (FF)	3 seats 1937–1977	
19th	1969	Bobby Molloy (FF)	Fintan Coogan Snr (FG)	Johnny Geoghegan (FF)	3 seats 1937–1977	
20th	1973	Bobby Molloy (FF)	Fintan Coogan Snr (FG)	Johnny Geoghegan (FF)	3 seats 1937–1977	
20th	1975 by-election	Bobby Molloy (FF)	Fintan Coogan Snr (FG)	Máire Geoghegan-Quinn (FF)	3 seats 1937–1977	
21st	1977	Bobby Molloy (FF)	John Mannion Jnr (FG)	Máire Geoghegan-Quinn (FF)	Bill Loughnane (FF)	4 seats 1977–1981
22nd	1981	Bobby Molloy (FF)	John Donnellan (FG)	Máire Geoghegan-Quinn (FF)	Mark Killilea Jnr (FF)	Michael D. Higgins (Lab)
23rd	1982 (Feb)	Bobby Molloy (FF)	John Donnellan (FG)	Máire Geoghegan-Quinn (FF)	Frank Fahey (FF)	Michael D. Higgins (Lab)
24th	1982 (Nov)	Bobby Molloy (FF)	John Donnellan (FG)	Máire Geoghegan-Quinn (FF)	Frank Fahey (FF)	Fintan Coogan Jnr (FG)
25th	1987	Bobby Molloy (PDs)	John Donnellan (FG)	Máire Geoghegan-Quinn (FF)	Frank Fahey (FF)	Michael D. Higgins (Lab)
26th	1989	Bobby Molloy (PDs)	Pádraic McCormack (FG)	Máire Geoghegan-Quinn (FF)	Frank Fahey (FF)	Michael D. Higgins (Lab)
27th	1992	Bobby Molloy (PDs)	Pádraic McCormack (FG)	Máire Geoghegan-Quinn (FF)	Éamon Ó Cuív (FF)	Michael D. Higgins (Lab)
28th	1997	Bobby Molloy (PDs)	Pádraic McCormack (FG)	Frank Fahey (FF)	Éamon Ó Cuív (FF)	Michael D. Higgins (Lab)
29th	2002	Noel Grealish (PDs)	Pádraic McCormack (FG)	Frank Fahey (FF)	Éamon Ó Cuív (FF)	Michael D. Higgins (Lab)
30th	2007	Noel Grealish (PDs)	Pádraic McCormack (FG)	Frank Fahey (FF)	Éamon Ó Cuív (FF)	Michael D. Higgins (Lab)
31st	2011	Noel Grealish (Ind.)	Brian Walsh (FG)	Seán Kyne (FG)	Éamon Ó Cuív (FF)	Derek Nolan (Lab)
32nd	2016	Noel Grealish (Ind.)	Hildegarde Naughton (FG)	Seán Kyne (FG)	Éamon Ó Cuív (FF)	Catherine Connolly (Ind.)
33rd	2020	Noel Grealish (Ind.)	Hildegarde Naughton (FG)	Mairéad Farrell (SF)	Éamon Ó Cuív (FF)	Catherine Connolly (Ind.)
34th	2024	Noel Grealish (Ind.)	Hildegarde Naughton (FG)	Mairéad Farrell (SF)	John Connolly (FF)	Catherine Connolly (Ind.)
34th	2026 by-election	Noel Grealish (Ind.)	Hildegarde Naughton (FG)	Mairéad Farrell (SF)	John Connolly (FF)	Seán Kyne (FG)
