= 2010 Irish budget =

- Presented: 9 December 2009
- Country: Ireland
- Parliament: 30th Dáil
- Government: 28th Government of Ireland
- Party: Fianna Fáil; Green Party; Progressive Democrats
- Minister for Finance: Brian Lenihan
- Website: Budget 2010

The 2010 Irish Budget refers to the delivery of a government budget by the Government of Ireland on 9 December 2009, its third in fourteen months. It was also the third overall budget to be delivered by Fianna Fáil's Brian Lenihan as Minister for Finance.

The 2010 Budget was described by commentators in Ireland and around the world in unusually harsh terms as €4 billion was removed from the country's national deficit. It was characterised by pay cuts for public sector workers and cuts in social welfare. According to the BBC, social welfare cuts had not been implemented by the country since 1924. The cuts prompted at least one angry outburst in Dáil Éireann, the principal chamber of the Oireachtas (Irish parliament). Among the other initiatives unveiled in this Budget was a car scrappage scheme as well as a new carbon tax.

The post-budget debate was interrupted by a famous use of unparliamentary language by Green Party TD Paul Gogarty, an example which attracted international attention.

== Background ==
The budget for 2010 occurred in the context of a major recession, which followed the Irish financial crisis. It also followed the difficult 2009 budget, which led to widespread protests, as well as a supplementary emergency budget in April 2009. This meant that the 2010 budget was the third to be delivered by the Finance Minister in only fourteen months.

== Budget summary ==
The following are the main points of Budget 2010.

- 4% cut in social welfare payments, excluding the state old age pension
- Child benefit decreased by €16 each month, although welfare-dependent families remain unchanged
- 20–21 year-olds Jobseekers' Allowance decreased to €100 per week in the event of these not having any dependents, 22–24 year-olds Jobseekers' Allowance decreased to €150 per week, the latter point also applying to anyone who does not take a job when offered
- 5–10% cut in public sector pay
- Carbon tax introduced
- High end VAT reduced from 21.5% to 21%
- Each item on medical card prescription to cost 50c after April 2010
- Higher income tax for PAYE earners (Due to tax credits being cut)
- A new Universal Social Charge (USC) to replace the Health levy portion of PRSI
- At least €70 million towards those affected by recent flooding and to the prevention of similar disasters in future

Excise duties on beer and cider were decreased by 12 cent, excise duties on a half-glass of spirits were decreased by 14 cent and a bottle of wine was decreased by 60 cent, with a warning from the Finance Minister that these reductions were open to being recalled if consumers did not benefit. Due to an increase in the smuggling of tobacco into Ireland, prices of tobacco remained unaltered.

A year-long car scrappage scheme was unveiled targeting vehicles which had been in use for more than a decade, with a €1,500 reduction in vehicle registration tax relief available for those who availed of this scheme (but only "under certain conditions").

The salary of the Taoiseach was decreased by 20 per cent on a permanent basis.

=== Arts ===
The arts budget decreased by 6 per cent to €166 million from the previous year's €178 million.

Culture Ireland received €4.083 million and the Irish Film Board received €19.31 million, both the same as figures from 2007. The Arts Council received €69.15 million, a decrease of 6 per cent. Section 481's tax relief for film and television production was not affected. The Zoological Society of Ireland's grant of €3 million for funding Dublin Zoo remained the same. However, the National Gallery of Ireland's grant was decreased by 7 per cent leaving it with an annual total of €10.17 million.

=== Sport ===
The Government allocated €115 million for sport, a decrease from the previous year's €127 million.

The Irish Sports Council received funding of €49.7 million, a decrease of 4 per cent. €59.2 million was allocated to horse and greyhound racing, a decrease of 13 per cent. The Sports Capital Programme received €48 million, down from €56 million the previous year. Aviva Stadium development funding will increase from €1.5 million to €4.5 million. Funding for Abbotstown's National Sports Campus increased by 20 per cent. The National Aquatic Centre received the rest.

=== Tourism ===
The Government allocated more than €155 million for tourism, an increase of 2 per cent from the previous year's Budget. €22 million of this was dedicated to tourist attractions. "Imaginative initiatives", including rail discounts for senior visiting citizens, were announced.

== Reaction ==
Taoiseach Brian Cowen said the Government would "do whatever was necessary to stabilise the deficit" and that "a job needed to be done", whilst maintaining that the Budget was "well received". Fine Gael's Richard Bruton responded to Brian Lenihan's claim that "the worst is over" by comparing the statement to former U.S. President George W. Bush declaring "mission accomplished" on the Iraq War in 2003. His colleague Alan Shatter accused the Government of buying off children with alcohol: "Forget the food and milk — let them drink beer", describing it as being from "the Marie Antoinette school of politics" and asking "which comedian was employed to author this bizarre document". The Labour Party's Joan Burton described it as "a sort of Top Gear lads Budget" with cheaper alcohol and cars being made available. Sinn Féin's leader in the Dáil Caoimhghín Ó Caoláin described anyone who had constructed Budget 2010 as "economically illiterate". His colleague Arthur Morgan bemoaned how the Budget benefited "the corrupt banker".

ICTU General Secretary David Begg was "shocked", claiming the Budget would cause Ireland's economy to fall further into recession. IBEC Director General Danny McCoy described the Budget as "a turning point" and one which would place Ireland "on a sustainable path".

The Irish Nurses Organisation described the public servant pay decrease as "grossly unfair, short-sighted, damaging and provocative" and would lead to "grave hardship". The Irish National Teachers' Organisation said those involved in the public sector would "pay for Government's disastrous handling of the economy" and that "hardworking public servants and their families had been squeezed yet again to pay the price of the economic crisis". IMPACT said the Budget was the same as "sacrificing long-term public service reform for short-term political expediency". The Association of Garda Sergeants and Inspectors said the Budget was an "attack on its members". The Construction Industry Federation said the loss of almost €1 billion was "a blow to jobs in its sector". The Irish Hotels Federation was grateful for the Government's "strong and decisive action". The Irish Hospital Consultants Association later revealed its willingness to agree 15% pay cut announced by the Finance Minister for its members in his Budget 2010.

The National Campaign for the Arts expressed relief and pleasure that it had not been affected very much by the Budget. Youth Work Ireland described the targeting of young people as "pure cynicism [...] a cynical move when contrasted with the 30,000 young people turned away from education courses last October". Drinks Industry Group of Ireland Chairman Kieran Tobin said reductions on the cost of alcohol would be "a great relief" and would "repatriate some of the revenue currently being lost to cross-border trade". Anti-smoking lobbyists ASH Ireland criticised the lack of increase in the price of tobacco. Friends of the Earth described the carbon tax being implemented as "an important piece of the jigsaw in tackling climate change". Oxfam Ireland CEO Jim Clarken spoke of being "extremely disappointed that the Government have piled further cuts on the massive 24% cut applied earlier this year" and accused the Irish government having "yet again, broken a promise to the world's poor".

Political Correspondent for The Irish Times Harry McGee dubbed it "the most austere Budget in the history of the State". The Irish Examiner said it "can only be described as one of the toughest Budgets in the history of the State". The BBC called it "one of the most severe budgets in the Republic's history". The New York Times referred to it as the "harshest budget in generations".

Global investors approved the measures introduced by Brian Lenihan, with Irish government bonds receiving a boost following the Budget. Former President of Ireland Mary Robinson announced two days after the delivery of Budget 2010 that she would be happy to take a 10 per cent reduction in her pension, a further 10 per cent added to what she had previously offered earlier that year.

Former RTÉ Economics Correspondent turned Fine Gael TD George Lee gave his view in the Galway Independent the following week under the headline: "not fair, not clever and not going to fix economy". Lee was critical of the proposed car scrappage scheme, saying it would benefit only the likes of France, Germany and Japan where the new cars would be imported from. He also condemned what he called "the crazy result of this decision is that an office cleaner in the Department of Finance will take a greater proportionate pay cut after tax than Minister Lenihan" and that the pay cut for Ministers announced in this Budget included the cut they had given themselves in the previous Budget in April 2009.

== Social Welfare Bill and "unparliamentary language" controversy ==
Attempts by the government to quickly legalise the Social Welfare Bill proposed in the Budget before the weekend were met with disapproval from the Opposition.

Fine Gael leader Enda Kenny criticised the Government for "acting in a disgraceful manner" and challenged them, "If you think you can come in here and do whatever you want you have another thing coming". Labour Party leader Eamon Gilmore suggested the Government would "round up its six strays and get here this evening to vote on the measure", in a thinly veiled reference to supporting Independents as well as those within Fianna Fáil who had lost the whip. Jimmy Devins and Eamon Scanlon were specifically referred to by Gilmore as "the two strays from Sligo". Independent Jackie Healy-Rae replied to critics of his and his fellow Independents stance in supporting the Budget that they would be "glad to have us" on their side too if required to pass a vote.

Labour Party deputy Róisín Shortall suggested that "there is no obligation on them [backbenchers and Independents] to support this. They are not under a whip. It's their choice. If they vote for these (measures), well then they have to face the consequences in their constituency". Green Party deputy Paul Gogarty said, "It's regrettable but necessargy [sic]. And everyone on this side of the house is going to stand by it, because it has to be done".

"It [the expletive] was a genuine emotive response to someone questioning your integrity. I said it. I apologised for it [...] it’s probably too much to ask for, but I do hope that what I said in my speech will be covered, rather than just the lyrics of a Lily Allen song".

— Paul Gogarty tries to explain the reasons behind his use of expletives in the Dáil Chamber.

Gogarty was later condemned and forced to apologise for his use of "unparliamentary language" after he yelled "Fuck you, Deputy Stagg, fuck you" at veteran Labour Party TD Emmet Stagg during the debate on the Social Welfare Bill on 11 December 2009. Fine Gael Senator Frances Fitzgerald remarked, "If only Paul Gogarty got as upset about carers, blind pensioners and dole recipients as he does about perceived slights to his ego." Fine Gael deputy Lucinda Creighton called for the expulsion of Gogarty from the House. Ceann Comhairle Séamus Kirk, requesting the need for "decent standards", sent the expletives to the Dáil Committee on Procedure and Privileges. It was discovered that "fuck" was not actually contained alongside such terms as "brat"; "buffoon"; "communist"; "coward"; "fascist"; "guttersnipe"; "hypocrite"; "rat"; "scumbag"; "scurrilous" and "yahoo" in Salient Rulings of the Chair, an 83-page document governing parliamentary language.

Green Party deputies were described as "less than pleased" at Gogarty's conduct. Green Party leader John Gormley later commented on the incident: "It was unacceptable language. He should not have said it. He has apologised and withdrawn the remarks. I have not had an opportunity to speak to him as yet. It is over. He has apologised now." Stagg was not bothered, citing "a thick skin" and the "development of a hide". Gogarty received a positive response from his constituents and went on to feature on Operation Transformation the following month.

The Social Welfare Bill passed by 81 to 75 votes on the evening of 11 December. Government deputies who missed the vote included former Taoiseach Bertie Ahern, former Ceann Comhairle John O'Donoghue and Donegal North-East deputies Jim McDaid and Niall Blaney.

== Estimated total receipts ==
=== Estimated tax receipts ===
Estimated of tax receipts for fiscal year 2010 are €31.930 billion (−1.9%).

Rank	Category	€ millions
1	Total	31,930
2	Income tax	11,979
3	Value added tax	10,460
4	Excise	4,525
5	Stamp duties	975
6	Capital gains tax	340
7	Capital Acquisitions Tax	240
8	Customs	200

=== Non-tax revenue ===
Estimated of non-tax revenue for fiscal year 2010 are €2.355 billion (+182.4%).

Rank	Category	€ millions
1	Total	2,355
2	Credit Institutions Scheme	1,000
3	Central Bank Surplus Scheme	640
4	National Lottery Surplus	272
5	Dividends	176
6	Winding up of Ulysses Securitisation	140
7	Other Receipts	127

== See also ==
- 2009 Irish emergency budget – an earlier Budget delivered by the Irish Government in 2009
