= 2011 Irish budget =

- Presented: 7 December 2010
- Parliament: 30th Dáil
- Government: 28th Government of Ireland
- Party: Fianna Fáil; Green Party; Progressive Democrats
- Minister for Finance: Brian Lenihan
- Website: Budget 2011

The 2011 Irish Budget refers to the delivery of a government budget by the Government of Ireland on 7 December 2010. It was also the fourth and final overall budget to be delivered by Fianna Fáil's Brian Lenihan as Minister for Finance. The budget for 2011 occurred in the context of a major recession, which followed the Irish financial crisis. The budget was described as the most draconian budget in the history of the State, with €6bn worth of savings.

== Main points ==
This is a list of the main points contained in the 2011 Budget.

- No reduction in state pension.
- €10 reduction in Child Benefit rates.
- €8 cut for social welfare, jobseekers payments.
- 4c on petrol, 2c on diesel from midnight.
- Revised air travel tax of €3 from March 2011.
- €40 payment for fuel allowance recipients.
- New minimum wage not in tax net.
- Public service pay will not be cut
- Public sector salary capped at €250k
- Public service pensions over €12k cut 4%
- Taoiseach salary cut by €14k; ministers by €10k
- Next President's salary to be capped at €250,000
- Employee PRSI/health levy pension relief gone
- Income/health levies to be replaced by single universal social charge. Rates on the charge will be 0% below €4,004 a year, 2% up to €10,036, 4% from €10,036 to €16,016 and 7% above this level
- Pension contributions subject to PRSI and Universal Social Charge
- Employee PRSI contribution ceiling removed
- Increase in the PRSI rate for the self-employed, higher earning public servants and office holders
- 1% tax on residential transactions up to €1m; 2% over €1m
- All stamp duty exemptions abolished
- Car scrappage extended for six months
- No change to Ireland's corporation rate
- Value of tax bands and credits to be reduced by 10%
- DIRT increased by 2%
- Online betting will be subject to the same betting duty as in bookie shops
- Carer's Allowance for those under 66 to be cut by €8 to €212 a week
- Disability Allowance being cut by €8 to €186 a week
- Business Expansion Scheme to be revamped
- 15,000 activation places for unemployed
- Third-level student charges are to rise by €500 to €2000
- Student grants are to be cut by 4%
- New passport fees for over 65s
