= Brendan Smith (politician) =

Irish politician (born 1956)

Brendan Smith TD
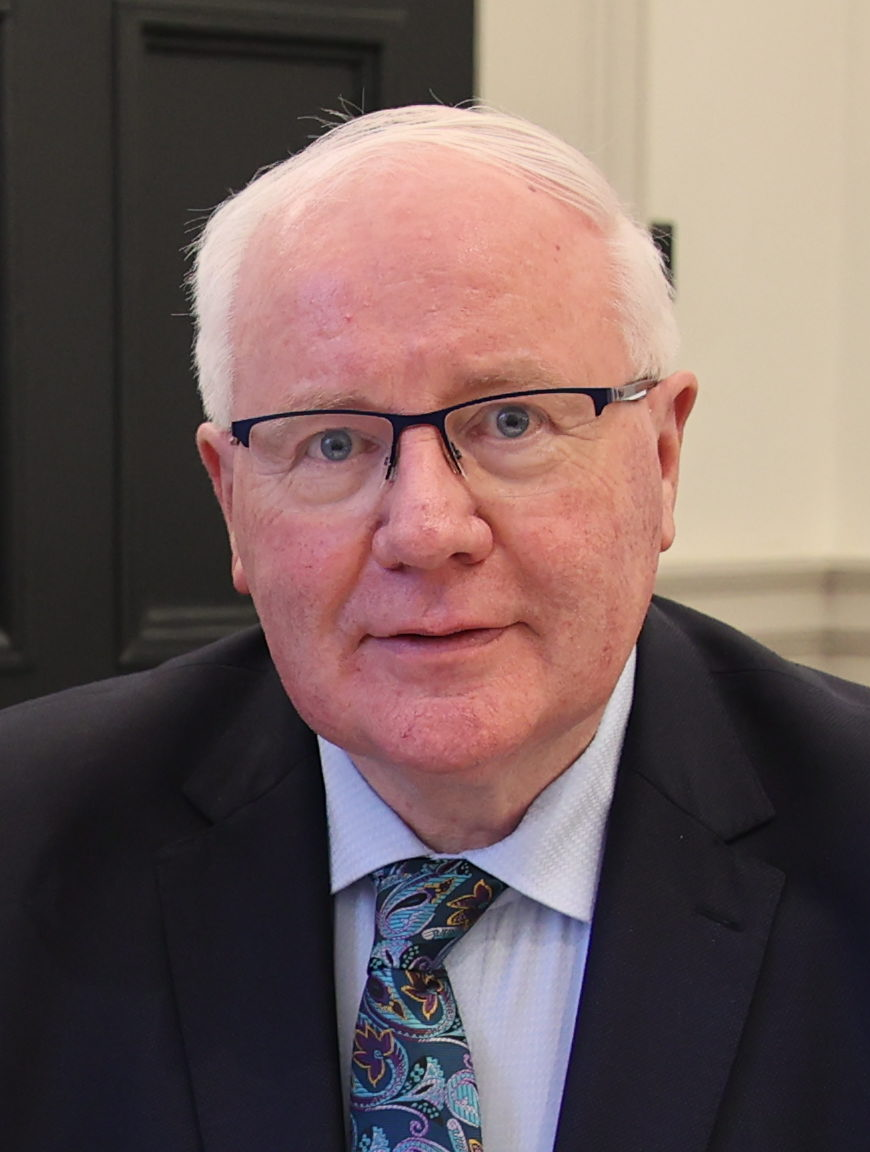
- Smith in 2024

Chair of the Fianna Fáil parliamentary party
- Incumbent
- Assumed office 26 May 2016
- Leader: Micheál Martin
- Preceded by: John Browne

Chair of the Joint Committee on Foreign Affairs and Trade
- In office 4 April 2016 – 15 September 2020
- Preceded by: Pat Breen
- Succeeded by: Charles Flanagan

Minister for Justice and Law Reform
- In office 20 January 2011 – 9 March 2011
- Taoiseach: Brian Cowen
- Preceded by: Dermot Ahern
- Succeeded by: Alan Shatter (Justice and Equality)

Minister for Agriculture, Fisheries and Food
- In office 7 May 2008 – 9 March 2011
- Taoiseach: Brian Cowen
- Preceded by: Mary Coughlan
- Succeeded by: Simon Coveney (Agriculture, Food and the Marine)

Minister of State
- 2007–2008: Children
- 2004–2007: Agriculture, Fisheries and Food

Teachta Dála
- Incumbent
- Assumed office November 1992
- Constituency: Cavan–Monaghan

Personal details
- Born: 1 June 1956 (age 70) Cavan, Ireland
- Party: Fianna Fáil
- Spouse: Anne McGarry (m. 1985)
- Education: University College Dublin
- Website: brendansmith.ie

Brendan Smith (born 1 June 1956) is an Irish Fianna Fáil politician who has served as chair of the Fianna Fáil parliamentary party since May 2016. He has been a TD for Cavan–Monaghan since 1992. He previously served as chair of the Committee on Foreign Affairs and Trade from 2016 to 2020, Minister for Justice and Law Reform from January 2011 to March 2011, Minister for Agriculture, Fisheries and Food from 2008 to 2011, Minister of State for Children from 2007 to 2008 and Minister of State at the Department of Agriculture, Fisheries and Food from 2004 to 2007.

== Early life ==
Born in Cavan in 1956, Smith was educated at Bawnboy National School, St. Camillus College, Killucan, County Westmeath, and University College Dublin, where he gained a Bachelor of Arts in Politics and Economics. For 15 years he worked as special advisor to the Fianna Fáil politician and former Tánaiste, John Wilson.

== Political career ==
Smith was first elected to Dáil Éireann at the 1992 general election for the Cavan–Monaghan constituency and has been re-elected at every subsequent election since. In the 28th Dáil, he was Government Whip on the Oireachtas Joint Committee on Foreign Affairs. In a 2004 reshuffle, Smith was appointed by Bertie Ahern as Minister of State at the Department of Agriculture, Fisheries and Food with special responsibility for Food and Horticulture.

Following the 2007 general election, Smith became Minister of State for Children. On 7 May 2008, he was appointed as Minister for Agriculture, Fisheries and Food in Brian Cowen's cabinet. In July 2010, Smith launched the Food Harvest 2020 strategy. Its overall target to increase the value of Ireland's agri-food and fisheries exports by €5bn to reach €12bn by 2020. A September 2012 progress report on the Food Harvest 2020 strategy, found that farmers and other primary producers had passed the halfway mark towards meeting their 2020 targets.

In 2010, during his term as Minister for Agriculture, he offered free cheese to Ireland's poor via a European Union scheme that had been around since the 1980s. The public received Smith's announcement poorly and it was reported outside Ireland as the country became "a laughing stock internationally". Smith was then forced to defend his own scheme.

Following the resignation of Dermot Ahern from the cabinet in January 2011, Smith was appointed as Minister for Justice and Law Reform in addition to his existing portfolio.

Just before leaving office, Smith gave the go-ahead for genetically modified organism (GMO) foods to enter Ireland. He told the media that Ireland had "altered its voting position" and would back proposals from the European Commission "aimed at authorising the placing on the market of food, food ingredients and feed containing, consisting of, or produced from genetically modified maize and cotton". Smith also said that Ireland would now tolerate "the low-level presence of, as yet, unauthorised GMO varieties in imports of animal food".

He was one of just 19 Fianna Fáil TDs re-elected to the 31st Dáil, following the 2011 general election. He was initially appointed as the Fianna Fáil Spokesperson on Education and Skills, serving from April 2011 to July 2012. In 2012, he was made party Spokesperson on Foreign Affairs and Trade, as well as Border Region Development. He held this position until the 2016 general election.

== Political career since 2016 ==
He was re-elected to the Dáil for Cavan Monaghan constituency at the 2016 general election along with party colleague Niamh Smyth TD. In May 2016, he was appointed as chair of the Committee on Foreign Affairs and Trade. The previous month he was appointed chair of the Fianna Fáil parliamentary party. In January 2019, he announced he was seeking the Fianna Fáil nomination to contest the 2019 European elections for the Midlands–North-West constituency. He secured the nomination at a convention of Fianna Fáil party delegates in Longford in March 2019, but did not win a seat in the subsequent election. After the election Smith told a local radio station that the Fianna Fáil party had made a mistake in running two candidates rather than one, he also confirmed that he planned to run for the Dáil at the next election. At the 2020 general election, he again won re-election to the Dáil.

Political offices
Preceded by Noel Treacy	Minister of State at the Department of Agriculture, Fisheries and Food; 2004–2007	Succeeded by Trevor Sargent
Preceded by Brian Lenihan	Minister of State for Children; 2007–2008	Succeeded by Barry Andrews
Preceded by Mary Coughlan	Minister for Agriculture, Fisheries and Food; 2008–2011	Succeeded by Simon Coveney as Minister for Agriculture, Food and the Marine
Preceded by Dermot Ahern	Minister for Justice and Law Reform; 2011	Succeeded by Alan Shatter as Minister for Justice and Equality
Party political offices
Preceded by John Browne	Chair of the Fianna Fáil parliamentary party 2016–present	Incumbent

Dáil	Election	Deputy (Party)	Deputy (Party)	Deputy (Party)	Deputy (Party)	Deputy (Party)
21st	1977	Jimmy Leonard (FF)	John Wilson (FF)	Thomas J. Fitzpatrick (FG)	Rory O'Hanlon (FF)	John Conlan (FG)
22nd	1981	Kieran Doherty (AHB)	John Wilson (FF)	Thomas J. Fitzpatrick (FG)	Rory O'Hanlon (FF)	John Conlan (FG)
23rd	1982 (Feb)	Jimmy Leonard (FF)	John Wilson (FF)	Thomas J. Fitzpatrick (FG)	Rory O'Hanlon (FF)	John Conlan (FG)
24th	1982 (Nov)	Jimmy Leonard (FF)	John Wilson (FF)	Thomas J. Fitzpatrick (FG)	Rory O'Hanlon (FF)	John Conlan (FG)
25th	1987	Jimmy Leonard (FF)	John Wilson (FF)	Thomas J. Fitzpatrick (FG)	Rory O'Hanlon (FF)	Andrew Boylan (FG)
26th	1989	Jimmy Leonard (FF)	John Wilson (FF)	Bill Cotter (FG)	Rory O'Hanlon (FF)	Andrew Boylan (FG)
27th	1992	Jimmy Leonard (FF)	Brendan Smith (FF)	Seymour Crawford (FG)	Rory O'Hanlon (FF)	Andrew Boylan (FG)
28th	1997	Caoimhghín Ó Caoláin (SF)	Brendan Smith (FF)	Seymour Crawford (FG)	Rory O'Hanlon (FF)	Andrew Boylan (FG)
29th	2002	Caoimhghín Ó Caoláin (SF)	Brendan Smith (FF)	Seymour Crawford (FG)	Rory O'Hanlon (FF)	Paudge Connolly (Ind.)
30th	2007	Caoimhghín Ó Caoláin (SF)	Brendan Smith (FF)	Seymour Crawford (FG)	Rory O'Hanlon (FF)	Margaret Conlon (FF)
31st	2011	Caoimhghín Ó Caoláin (SF)	Brendan Smith (FF)	Heather Humphreys (FG)	Joe O'Reilly (FG)	Seán Conlan (FG)
32nd	2016	Caoimhghín Ó Caoláin (SF)	Brendan Smith (FF)	Heather Humphreys (FG)	Niamh Smyth (FF)	4 seats 2016–2020
33rd	2020	Matt Carthy (SF)	Brendan Smith (FF)	Heather Humphreys (FG)	Niamh Smyth (FF)	Pauline Tully (SF)
34th	2024	Matt Carthy (SF)	Brendan Smith (FF)	David Maxwell (FG)	Niamh Smyth (FF)	Cathy Bennett (SF)
