= Standing Orders of Dáil Éireann =

Parliamentary rules in Ireland

Standing Orders of Dáil Éireann are the rules governing parliamentary procedure in Dáil Eireann, the lower chamber of the Republic of Ireland. They were first adopted by the 3rd Dáil on 11 September 1922.

They are updated and amended by the Dáil, with a new edition published at the start of each term of the Dáil. In themselves, they are not complete, but are interpreted by the Ceann Comhairle, whose decisions are published in the Salient Rulings of the Chair.
