= Conor Lenihan =

Irish former politician (born 1963)

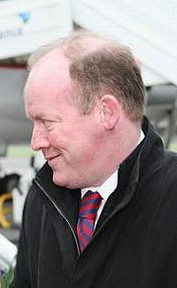
- Lenihan in 2008

Minister of State
- 2009–2011: Communications, Energy and Natural Resources
- 2010–2011: Education and Skills
- 2010–2011: Enterprise, Trade and Innovation
- 2009–2010: Enterprise, Trade and Employment
- 2007–2010: Education and Science
- 2007–2009: Community, Rural and Gaeltacht Affairs
- 2007–2009: Justice, Equality and Law Reform
- 2004–2007: Foreign Affairs

Teachta Dála
- In office June 1997 – February 2011
- Constituency: Dublin South-West

Personal details
- Born: 3 March 1963 (age 63) Dublin, Ireland
- Party: Fianna Fáil
- Spouses: Denise Russell (m. 1999, divorced); Nikita Umwali (m. 2013)
- Children: 5
- Parent: Brian Lenihan Snr (father)
- Relatives: Brian Lenihan Jnr (brother); Patrick Lenihan (grandfather); Mary O'Rourke (aunt)
- Education: University College Dublin; Dublin City University; INSEAD

Conor Lenihan (born 3 March 1963) is an Irish former Fianna Fáil politician who served as a Minister of State from 2004 to 2011. He served as a Teachta Dála (TD) for the Dublin South-West constituency from 1997 to 2011.

From 2011 to 2015, he was a vice president of the Skolkovo Foundation, the coordination body for a planned high-tech innovation centre on the edge of Moscow, where he worked on international partnership development.

== Early and personal life ==
Lenihan was born in Dublin in 1963. He lived in Athlone until he was 11 years of age. He was educated at Belvedere College, University College Dublin (where he was chair of the Kevin Barry Cumann of Ógra Fianna Fáil), Dublin City University and the INSEAD.

Lenihan began his working life as a newspaper journalist in the 1980s in the House of Commons in London, where he was a political correspondent for the Irish News. While in London he was also a member of the European Commission's Speakers Panel.

In the 1990s, he went into broadcast journalism working with the Dublin radio station 98FM. Lenihan also worked as a senior executive with O2, an Irish-owned mobile operator, and subsequently worked as an advisor for the company.

Lenihan is the son of former Tánaiste, TD and Minister Brian Lenihan. His grandfather, Patrick Lenihan, also served in the Oireachtas. His aunt, Mary O'Rourke, is a former TD, Senator and Minister, while his brother, Brian Lenihan Jnr was a TD and Minister for Finance from 2008 to 2011 during the Irish economic downturn.

Lenihan was diagnosed with a benign tumour in 2007.

Lenihan was also the editor of The Nation, the official publication of the Fianna Fáil party.

In 1999, Lenihan married Denise Russell, and they had three children. They later divorced. In 2013, Lenihan married Nikita Umwali in Moscow. They have two children.

== Political career ==
Lenihan was first elected to the Dáil at the 1997 general election.

In a reshuffle in October 2004, he was appointed by Bertie Ahern as Minister of State at the Department of Foreign Affairs with special responsibility for Overseas Development and Human Rights. Lenihan restructured Ireland's international aid programme, creating Irish Aid, the Irish Government's programme of assistance to developing countries. Through Irish Aid, Lenihan administered a budget of almost a billion euros which is used to help developing nations thus continuing Ireland's tradition of reaching out to other post-colonial nations.

In June 2007, when a new coalition government was formed by Ahern after the election, he was appointed as Minister of State at the Department of Community, Rural and Gaeltacht Affairs, at the Department of Education and Science, and at the Department of Justice, Equality and Law Reform, with responsibility for integration policy. He led a government initiative to deal with large volume immigration into Ireland which culminated with the publication of a new policy statement "Migration Nation". He was reappointed in this role when Brian Cowen succeeded as Taoiseach in May 2008.

In a reshuffle in April 2009, he was appointed as Minister of State at the Department of Enterprise, Trade and Employment, at the Department of Education and Science and at the Department of Communications, Energy and Natural Resources, with special responsibility for Science, Technology, Innovation and Natural Resources. He created a single budget line for science and technology funding as well as participating in the country's Innovation Task Force. As part of his role in the ministry, he participated in trade and investment missions, frequently presenting to top global companies who already invest in Ireland or were about to do so. He was a member of the Cabinet Sub-Committee on Economic Recovery.

He lost his seat at the 2011 general election, with his first preference vote declining from 20.5% in 2007 to just 5%. He placed eighth in the poll and was eliminated on the fourth count.

In October 2018, Lenihan announced his intention to seek the Fianna Fáil nomination for the Dublin constituency in the 2019 European Parliament elections. At the party candidate selection meeting in February 2019 Lenihan placed fourth out of four candidates with 108 votes of the 838 ballots cast.

=== Controversies ===
==== Attitude to immigrants ====
Lenihan was involved in some controversy on 18 May 2005, when off-microphone he told opposition TD Joe Higgins of the Socialist Party that he should "stick to [helping] the kebabs", a reference to the Turkish workers who were making a legal challenge against their employer, GAMA. Lenihan apologised in the Dáil for the remarks.

In 2007, he banned Gardaí and Garda reserves from wearing the Sikh turban, saying "if we are to take integration seriously, people who come here must understand our way of doing things. When the President and Ministers travel to the Middle East, they accept cultural requirements of the country and the culture in which they are operating. It is a vice-versa situation with regard to Ireland."

==== The Origin of Specious Nonsense ====
In September 2010, Lenihan attracted controversy when it emerged that he was to attend the launch of The Origin of Specious Nonsense, an anti-evolution book by John J. May. PZ Myers, on his Pharyngula blog, expressed shock that a Minister of State with special responsibility for Science would lend support to such a book. Lenihan claimed that he was "not launching the book as Minister for Science but rather as a TD because May is a constituent of his". In the wake of this controversy, May asked Lenihan not to launch the book "because I am so embarrassed that the Minister for Science has been so insulted" and "eviscerated" on a political website.

==== Tonight with Vincent Browne ====
While appearing in March 2011 on Tonight with Vincent Browne on television, presenter Vincent Browne asked if there was "a happy coincidence" between matters of national importance and what Lenihan was personally interested in, leading to what The Irish Times described as "some on-air rage".

== Post-political career ==
In July 2011, Lenihan joined Skolkovo Foundation, a planned scientific and innovation centre outside Moscow, Russia. In August 2012, Lenihan joined the board of San Leon Energy, an oil and gas explorer with concessions in Poland, Albania, Morocco and Ireland.

Political offices
Preceded by Tom Kitt	Minister of State for Overseas Development and Human Rights; 2004–2007	Succeeded by Michael Kitt
New post	Minister of State for Integration Policy; 2007–2009	Succeeded by John Curran
New post	Minister of State for Science, Technology, Innovation and Natural Resources; 2009–2011	Office abolished

Dáil	Election	Deputy (Party)	Deputy (Party)	Deputy (Party)	Deputy (Party)	Deputy (Party)
13th	1948	Seán MacBride (CnaP)	Peadar Doyle (FG)	Bernard Butler (FF)	Michael O'Higgins (FG)	Robert Briscoe (FF)
14th	1951	Seán MacBride (CnaP)	Peadar Doyle (FG)	Bernard Butler (FF)	Michael ffrench-O'Carroll (Ind.)	Robert Briscoe (FF)
15th	1954	Seán MacBride (CnaP)	Peadar Doyle (FG)	Bernard Butler (FF)	Michael O'Higgins (FG)	Robert Briscoe (FF)
15th	1956 by-election	Seán MacBride (CnaP)	Noel Lemass (FF)	Bernard Butler (FF)	Michael O'Higgins (FG)	Robert Briscoe (FF)
16th	1957	James Carroll (Ind.)	Noel Lemass (FF)	Bernard Butler (FF)	Michael O'Higgins (FG)	Robert Briscoe (FF)
16th	1959 by-election	James Carroll (Ind.)	Noel Lemass (FF)	Richie Ryan (FG)	Michael O'Higgins (FG)	Robert Briscoe (FF)
17th	1961	James Carroll (Ind.)	Noel Lemass (FF)	Richie Ryan (FG)	James O'Keeffe (FG)	Robert Briscoe (FF)
18th	1965	John O'Connell (Lab)	Noel Lemass (FF)	Richie Ryan (FG)	Joseph Dowling (FF)	Ben Briscoe (FF)
19th	1969	John O'Connell (Lab)	Noel Lemass (FF)	Seán Dunne (Lab)	Joseph Dowling (FF)	4 seats 1969–1977
19th	1970 by-election	John O'Connell (Lab)	Noel Lemass (FF)	Seán Sherwin (FF)	Joseph Dowling (FF)	4 seats 1969–1977
20th	1973	John O'Connell (Lab)	Noel Lemass (FF)	Declan Costello (FG)	Joseph Dowling (FF)	4 seats 1969–1977
20th	1976 by-election	John O'Connell (Lab)	Brendan Halligan (Lab)	Declan Costello (FG)	Joseph Dowling (FF)	4 seats 1969–1977
21st	1977	Constituency abolished. See Dublin Ballyfermot				

Dáil	Election	Deputy (Party)	Deputy (Party)	Deputy (Party)	Deputy (Party)	Deputy (Party)
22nd	1981	Seán Walsh (FF)	Larry McMahon (FG)	Mary Harney (FF)	Mervyn Taylor (Lab)	4 seats 1981–1992
23rd	1982 (Feb)	Seán Walsh (FF)	Larry McMahon (FG)	Mary Harney (FF)	Mervyn Taylor (Lab)	4 seats 1981–1992
24th	1982 (Nov)	Seán Walsh (FF)	Michael O'Leary (FG)	Mary Harney (FF)	Mervyn Taylor (Lab)	4 seats 1981–1992
25th	1987	Seán Walsh (FF)	Chris Flood (FF)	Mary Harney (PDs)	Mervyn Taylor (Lab)	4 seats 1981–1992
26th	1989	Pat Rabbitte (WP)	Chris Flood (FF)	Mary Harney (PDs)	Mervyn Taylor (Lab)	4 seats 1981–1992
27th	1992	Pat Rabbitte (DL)	Chris Flood (FF)	Mary Harney (PDs)	Mervyn Taylor (Lab)	Éamonn Walsh (Lab)
28th	1997	Pat Rabbitte (DL)	Chris Flood (FF)	Mary Harney (PDs)	Conor Lenihan (FF)	Brian Hayes (FG)
29th	2002	Pat Rabbitte (Lab)	Charlie O'Connor (FF)	Seán Crowe (SF)	Conor Lenihan (FF)	4 seats 2002–2016
30th	2007	Pat Rabbitte (Lab)	Charlie O'Connor (FF)	Brian Hayes (FG)	Conor Lenihan (FF)	4 seats 2002–2016
31st	2011	Pat Rabbitte (Lab)	Eamonn Maloney (Lab)	Brian Hayes (FG)	Seán Crowe (SF)	4 seats 2002–2016
31st	2014 by-election	Pat Rabbitte (Lab)	Eamonn Maloney (Lab)	Paul Murphy (AAA)	Seán Crowe (SF)	4 seats 2002–2016
32nd	2016	Colm Brophy (FG)	John Lahart (FF)	Paul Murphy (AAA–PBP)	Seán Crowe (SF)	Katherine Zappone (Ind.)
33rd	2020	Colm Brophy (FG)	John Lahart (FF)	Paul Murphy (S–PBP)	Seán Crowe (SF)	Francis Noel Duffy (GP)
34th	2024	Colm Brophy (FG)	John Lahart (FF)	Paul Murphy (PBP–S)	Seán Crowe (SF)	Ciarán Ahern (Lab)
