= Minister of State for Children =

The minister of state for children (Note: The last minister was styled in full: Minister of State at the Department of Health and Children, at the Department of Justice and Law Reform and at the Department of Education and Skills (with special responsibility for Children).) was a junior ministerial post in the Departments of Health and Children, Justice and Law Reform and Education and Skills of the Government of Ireland. The minister of state worked together with the various senior ministers in these departments and had special responsibility for children's affairs.

The first minister of state with responsibility for children was appointed on 20 December 1994. There has not been a minister of state with this responsibility since the creation of the full cabinet position of Minister for Children and Youth Affairs in March 2011.

== List of office-holders 1994–2011 ==
| Name | Term of office | | Party | Government |
|---|---|---|---|---|
| Austin Currie | 20 December 1994 | 26 June 1997 | Fine Gael | 24th |
| Frank Fahey | 8 July 1997 | 1 February 2000 | Fianna Fáil | 25th |
| Mary Hanafin | 1 February 2000 | 6 June 2002 | Fianna Fáil | 25th |
| Brian Lenihan | 19 June 2002 | 14 June 2007 | Fianna Fáil | 26th |
| Brendan Smith | 20 June 2007 | 7 May 2008 | Fianna Fáil | 27th |
| Barry Andrews | 7 May 2008 | 9 March 2011 | Fianna Fáil | 28th |
