= Minister of State at the Department of Education and Youth =

List of Irish Ministers of State

The minister of state at the Department of Education and Youth is a junior ministerial post in the Department of Education and Youth of the Government of Ireland who performs duties and functions delegated by the minister for education and youth. A minister of state does not hold cabinet rank.

There is currently one minister of state:

- Michael Moynihan, TD – Minister of State with responsibility for special education and inclusion

== List of parliamentary secretaries ==
=== Department of Education 1969–1978 ===
Name	Term of Office		Party	Government
Patrick Lindsay	2 July 1956	24 October 1956	Fine Gael	7th
Bobby Molloy	2 July 1969	9 May 1970	Fianna Fáil	13th
Michael O'Kennedy	9 May 1970	3 January 1973	Fianna Fáil	13th
Jim Tunney	3 January 1973	5 February 1973	Fianna Fáil	13th
John Bruton	14 March 1973	25 May 1977	Fine Gael	14th
Jim Tunney	5 July 1977	1 January 1978	Fianna Fáil	15th

== List of ministers of state ==
=== Department of Education 1978–1997 ===
Name	Term of Office		Party	Responsibilities	Government
Jim Tunney	1 January 1978	11 December 1979	Fianna Fáil		15th
Jim Tunney	12 December 1979	30 June 1981	Fianna Fáil		16th
Michael Keating	30 June 1981	9 March 1982	Fine Gael	Youth and Sport	17th
Máire Geoghegan-Quinn	9 March 1982	14 December 1982	Fianna Fáil	Youth and Sport	18th
Donal Creed	16 December 1982	18 February 1986	Fine Gael	School Buildings and Sport	19th
George Birmingham	15 December 1983	13 February 1986	Fine Gael	Youth Affairs	19th
Seán Barrett	13 February 1986	10 March 1987	Fine Gael	Sport	19th
Enda Kenny	18 February 1986	10 March 1987	Fine Gael	Youth Affairs	19th
Frank Fahey	12 March 1987	12 July 1989	Fianna Fáil	Youth and Sport	20th
Frank Fahey	19 July 1989	11 February 1992	Fianna Fáil	Youth and Sport	21st
Liam Aylward	13 February 1992	14 January 1993	Fianna Fáil	Youth and Sport	22nd
Liam Aylward	14 January 1993	15 December 1994	Fianna Fáil	Youth and Sport	23rd
Bernard Allen	20 December 1994	26 June 1997	Fine Gael	School Buildings and Sport	24th
Austin Currie	20 December 1994	26 June 1997	Fine Gael	Children	24th
=== Department of Education and Science 1997–2010 ===
Name	Term of Office		Party	Responsibilities	Government
Michael Smith	1 July 1997	9 October 1997	Fianna Fáil	Science and Technology	25th
Willie O'Dea	8 July 1997	6 June 2002	Fianna Fáil	Adult Education, Youth Affairs and School Transport	25th
Noel Treacy	9 October 1997	6 June 2002	Fianna Fáil	Science and Technology	25th
Frank Fahey	21 January 1998	1 February 2000	Fianna Fáil	Children	25th
Mary Hanafin	1 February 2000	6 June 2002	Fianna Fáil	Children	25th
Síle de Valera	19 June 2002	8 December 2006	Fianna Fáil	Adult Education, Youth Affairs and Educational Disadvantage	26th
Brian Lenihan	19 June 2002	14 June 2007	Fianna Fáil	Children	26th
Seán Haughey	12 December 2006	14 June 2007	Fianna Fáil	Adult Education, Youth Affairs and Educational Disadvantage	26th
Seán Haughey	20 June 2007	7 May 2008	Fianna Fáil	Lifelong Learning, Youth Work and School Transport	27th
Seán Haughey	13 May 2008	9 March 2011	Fianna Fáil	Lifelong Learning, Youth Work and School Transport	28th
Conor Lenihan	20 June 2007	7 May 2008	Fianna Fáil	Integration Policy	27th
Conor Lenihan	13 May 2008	22 April 2009	Fianna Fáil	Integration Policy	28th
Conor Lenihan	22 April 2009	9 March 2011	Fianna Fáil	Science, Technology, Innovation and Natural Resources	28th
Michael Ahern	20 June 2007	7 May 2008	Fianna Fáil	Innovation Policy	27th
Jimmy Devins	9 July 2007	7 May 2008	Fianna Fáil	Disability Issues and Mental Health	27th
Jimmy Devins	13 May 2008	22 April 2009	Fianna Fáil	Science, Technology and Innovation	28th
John Moloney	13 May 2008	23 March 2010	Fianna Fáil	Equality, Disability Issues and Mental Health	28th
John Moloney	23 March 2010	9 March 2011	Fianna Fáil	Disability Issues and Mental Health	28th
John Curran	22 April 2009	23 March 2010	Fianna Fáil	Integration and Community	28th
=== Department of Education and Skills 2010–2020 ===
Name	Term of office		Party	Responsibilities	Government
Mary White	23 March 2010	23 January 2011	Green	Equality and Human Rights; and Integration	28th
Seán Sherlock	10 March 2011	15 July 2014	Labour	Research and Innovation	29th
Ciarán Cannon	10 March 2011	15 July 2014	Fine Gael	Training and Skills	29th
Damien English	15 July 2014	19 May 2016	Fine Gael	Skills, Research and Innovation	29th
John Halligan	19 May 2016	14 June 2017	Independent	Training and Skills	30th
John Halligan	14 June 2017	27 June 2020	Independent	Training and Skills	31st
Mary Mitchell O'Connor	14 June 2017	27 June 2020	Fine Gael	Higher Education	31st
=== Department of Education 2020–2025 ===
Name	Term of office		Party	Responsibilities	Government
Josepha Madigan	1 July 2020	17 December 2022	Fine Gael	Special education and inclusion	32nd
Josepha Madigan	21 December 2022	22 March 2024	Fine Gael	Special education and inclusion	33rd
Thomas Byrne	21 December 2022	23 January 2025	Fianna Fáil	Sport and physical education	33rd • 34th
Hildegarde Naughton	10 April 2024	23 January 2025	Fine Gael	Special education and inclusion	34th
=== Department of Education and Youth 2025–present ===
Name	Term of office		Party	Responsibilities	Government
Michael Moynihan	29 January 2025	Incumbent	Fianna Fáil	Special education and inclusion	35th
