= Dermot Ahern =

Irish former politician (born 1955)

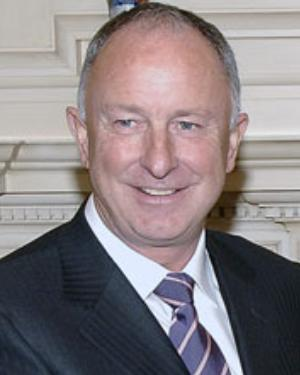

Minister for Justice and Law Reform
- In office 7 May 2008 – 19 January 2011
- Taoiseach: Brian Cowen
- Preceded by: Brian Lenihan (Justice, Equality and Law Reform)
- Succeeded by: Brendan Smith

Minister for Foreign Affairs
- In office 29 September 2004 – 7 May 2008
- Taoiseach: Bertie Ahern
- Preceded by: Brian Cowen
- Succeeded by: Micheál Martin

Minister for Communications, Marine and Natural Resources
- In office 6 June 2002 – 29 September 2004
- Taoiseach: Bertie Ahern
- Preceded by: Frank Fahey (Marine and Natural Resources)
- Succeeded by: Noel Dempsey

Minister for Social, Community and Family Affairs
- In office 26 June 1997 – 6 June 2002
- Taoiseach: Bertie Ahern
- Preceded by: Proinsias De Rossa (Social Welfare)
- Succeeded by: Mary Coughlan (Social and Family Affairs)

Minister of State
- 1991–1992: Government Chief Whip
- 1991–1992: Defence

Teachta Dála
- In office February 1987 – February 2011
- Constituency: Louth

Personal details
- Born: Dermot Christopher Ahern; 20 April 1955 (age 71) Dundalk, County Louth, Ireland
- Party: Fianna Fáil
- Spouse: Maeve Coleman (m. 1987)
- Children: 2
- Education: University College Dublin

Dermot Christopher Ahern (born 20 April 1955) is an Irish former Fianna Fáil politician who served as Minister for Justice and Law Reform from 2008 to 2011, Minister for Foreign Affairs from 2004 to 2008, Minister for Communications, Marine and Natural Resources from 2002 to 2004, Minister for Social, Community and Family Affairs from 1997 to 2002 and Government Chief Whip and Minister of State at the Department of Defence from 1991 to 1992. He served as a Teachta Dála (TD) for the Louth constituency from 1987 to 2011.

== Early and private life ==
Ahern was born in Dundalk, County Louth, in 1955. He was educated at the Marist College in Dundalk and later attended University College Dublin. Afterwards, he studied at the Law Society of Ireland and was admitted as a solicitor.

Ahern currently lives in Blackrock near Dundalk, with his wife and their two children. His pastimes include playing golf and windsurfing. He is a former Ulster windsurfing champion. Ahern is a former chairman of Rock Celtic soccer club and was also treasurer of Dundalk F.C. Supporter's Club.

== Early political career ==
Ahern was born into a family that had no association with party politics. He became involved in politics at a young age and became a member of Louth County Council in 1979 as a Fianna Fáil representative. He served on that authority until 1991 when he resigned due to the provisions of the Dual Mandate. Ahern was first elected to Dáil Éireann at the 1987 general election retaking the Dundalk-based Fianna Fáil seat. The following year he was appointed assistant government chief whip by Taoiseach Charles Haughey. His Louth Fianna Fáil constituency colleague had been a Minister of State since 1987.

Three years later in 1991, the Minister for Finance, Albert Reynolds, failed in his attempt to oust Haughey as leader. Ahern, who supported Haughey, was rewarded with the post of Minister of State at the Department of the Taoiseach with special responsibility as Government Chief Whip and Minister of State at the Department of Defence. During this time period Ahern played a role in the germination of the Irish peace process during secret direct talks between members of Sinn Féin, Alec Reid and members of Fianna Fáil led by Martin Mansergh. Ahern also attended as a local Fianna Fáil minister along with Richie Healy in the Redemptorist Church, Dundalk. These were secret talks and would have been denied if disclosed publicly by political opponents or the media. In February 1992, Haughey was forced to resign and Albert Reynolds became party leader and Taoiseach. Ahern then became a backbencher for the entire duration of the Fianna Fáil-Labour Party government. During this time Reynolds assumed sole ownership of the Fianna Fáil strategy for the Peace Process.

In late 1994, Bertie Ahern (no relation) succeeded Reynolds as leader of Fianna Fáil. Ahern once again returned to the senior ranks of the party becoming chief whip. In 1997, he was sent to London to check out rumours that another senior party member, Ray Burke, had received a payment from Joseph Murphy. The claim was denied and Burke was appointed Minister for Foreign Affairs two days later following the return to power of Fianna Fáil. Burke later served a jail sentence for corruption including the Murphy bribe. Ahern has since taken a stance on the issue of political corruption in Ireland publicly calling for an outright ban of corporate and trade union donations to political parties. This is now Fianna Fáil party policy. In the 1997 Irish presidential election Mary McAleese sought and won the Fianna Fáil nomination at the expense of Albert Reynolds. Ahern was a prominent supporter of her candidacy and in the election she received over 50% of the first preference vote in Louth as she did in each Border constituency.

In 2009 Ahern's religious beliefs were questioned, especially in the way that his religious ideology may influence his political standpoint.

== Cabinet career ==
=== Minister for Social, Community and Family Affairs (1997–2002) ===
Following the 1997 general election, a Fianna Fáil–Progressive Democrats entered office, and Ahern was appointed Minister for Community, Social and Family Affairs. Ahern introduced the largest social welfare and pension increases in Irish history. He also achieved pension rights for Irish people who had emigrated from Ireland prior to 1953. The Accounts Section of the department was decentralised to Dundalk from Dublin during his term incorporating the former SWLO in Barrack Street, Dundalk, which were merged into the same building as Dundalk Revenue Commissioners, to centralise service provision and staffing requirements under the one-roof. Ahern personally opened the new offices to the public while Minister.

=== Minister for Communications, Marine and Natural Resources (2002–2004) ===
Following the return of the government at the 2002 general election, Ahern was appointed Minister for Communications, Marine and Natural Resources. He was critical of the main telecommunications provider eircom. He introduced a system of Policy Directions to the telecoms regulator mandating, amongst other things, Flat Rate Internet Access. He devised a Broadband Action Plan which entailed the government building an alternative fibre infrastructure and co-location facilities. He sanctioned a reform package for public service broadcasting in Ireland and introduced a Charter for Ireland's national broadcaster RTÉ. He introduced a programme to provide free broadband internet access to schools. He secured EU recognition and protection of the Irish Box, an area of Irish territorial waters out of bounds to Spanish and Portuguese fishermen.

=== Minister for Foreign Affairs (2004–2008) ===
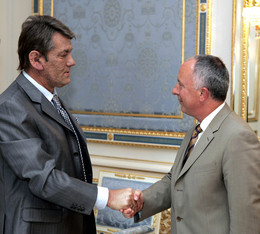
Ahern with Ukrainian President Viktor Yushchenko in July 2005

Following a cabinet reshuffle in 2004, Ahern was appointed as Minister for Foreign Affairs, the first Louth TD to hold that position since Frank Aiken in the 1960s. Shortly into his tenure in April 2005, Ahern was appointed one of four special envoys for United Nations reform by the UN Secretary General Kofi Annan.

Ahern spoke of the Third Phase in Irish foreign policy which he called "Active Neutrality". This was a vision of non-aligned Ireland taking up its international responsibilities by acting as a bridge between the developed and developing world, and by acting as a world leader in conflict and disasters. In this regard he took an extremely outspoken line on the crisis in Darfur, calling on the international community to 'wake up to the reality of rape, murder and destruction in the region. More recently Ahern has announced the establishment of an Irish Volunteer Corps and a Rapid Response Corps which would harness existing expertise amongst the Irish public to assist in the developing world. He has stated that, in foreign policy terms, 'the single greatest, economic, environmental, geopolitical issue now facing us is climate change.'

As Foreign Minister, Ahern was heavily involved in the Northern Ireland peace process. In 2006, he and several government leaders met regarding peace talks for Northern Ireland. Ahern met with the Secretary of State for Northern Ireland Peter Hain, US Ambassador to Ireland James C. Kenny, US Ambassador to the United Kingdom Robert H. Tuttle, the leadership of each of the main political parties involved in the process for peace, as well as three United States Congress members, James T. Walsh, Brian Higgins, and Tim Murphy. At the time of the meeting, there was a confirmation announcement of the Irish Republican Army (IRA) weapons decommissioning.

Ahern voiced concern over the 2006 Lebanon War. A shipment of bombs being sent to Israel by the United States was banned using Irish airspace or airfields.

Like many others in his party, therefore, Ahern describes himself as a republican, and made an associated statement regarding his self-identification at the 2006 Seán Moylan commemoration in Cork. At the 2006 Moylan commemoration, Ahern was quoted, stating: "As an Irish Republican, my main personal and political goal is to live to see the unity of Ireland". In Dundalk he has been a regular attendee at Dundalk & District Old IRA Commemorative events at Easter-time.

He led a campaign to secure a path to permanent residency for the 25,000 to 50,000 undocumented Irish citizens resident in the United States. He also introduced free passports for Irish senior citizens and had called for a comprehensive ban on the use of cluster munitions. Ahern was the first government Minister to call for a constitutional referendum on the issues arising from the Supreme Court judgment on statutory rape, five months before it became government policy.

After a call by the Irish Human Rights Commission that the Irish government inspect aircraft supposed to be a part of the US extraordinary rendition program, Ahern rejected these proposals. In a leaked diplomatic cable written by the US Ambassador to Ireland Thomas C. Foley, Foley reported that Ahern thought it "might not be a bad idea to allow the random inspection of a few planes to proceed, which would provide cover if a rendition flight ever surfaced. He seemed quite convinced that at least three flights involving renditions had refuelled at Shannon Airport before or after conducting renditions elsewhere".

=== Minister for Justice, Equality and Law Reform (2008–2011) ===
Ahern was appointed Minister for Justice, Equality and Law Reform on 7 May 2008, by the new Taoiseach Brian Cowen. On 29 April 2009, Ahern proposed an amendment to the Defamation Bill adding the crime of blasphemy to the statute book. The amendment was passed in the Dáil on 9 July 2009, with only an hour of the debate set aside for the bill, and was then narrowly passed by the Seanad the next day by walk-through vote, after being defeated in the initial electronic vote. This amendment was criticised by many within the public sphere, free speech campaigners and some ministers of European Union member states.

Ahern said that in March 2010 he would propose to the cabinet a constitutional amendment deleting the constitutional prohibition on blasphemy when the children's rights amendment comes up. Ahern was opposed to a stand-alone referendum that would have cost €3 or €4 million, his spokesman added. Ahern wrote in The Irish Times: "My intention is to remove the possibility of prison sentences and private prosecutions for blasphemy, currently provided for in Irish law. The only credible alternative to this move is a blasphemy referendum, which I consider, in the current circumstances, a costly and unwarranted diversion."

Ahern published the Civil Partnership Bill 2009 on 26 June 2009. This was enacted as the Civil Partnership and Certain Rights and Obligations of Cohabitants Act 2010.

He received the Murphy Report into child sexual abuse in the Dublin Diocese in June 2009. Most of the report was published on 26 November 2009 of that year, though parts were not, due to names that were undergoing prosecution.

As part of a reshuffle in March 2010, the Equality affairs section of the department was moved to the Department of Community, Equality and Gaeltacht Affairs.

On 15 November 2010, he described as 'fiction' the speculation that Ireland was about to seek financial aid from the European Union. He told RTÉ's The Week in Politics that 'nothing is going on at the direction of Government in relation to this.' On 21 November 2010, the Taoiseach Brian Cowen confirmed that Ireland had formally requested financial support from the European Union's European Financial Stability Facility and the International Monetary Fund.

=== Retirement ===
On 30 November 2010, he announced he would not contest his Dáil seat at the 2011 general election, as he has rheumatoid arthritis, and said it was a "painful medical condition necessitating heavy medication". He retired to a combined annual ministerial and TD's pension of €128,300. He resigned as Minister for Justice and Law Reform on 19 January 2011.

== Comments during debate on decriminalisation of homosexuality ==
During the debate on decriminalisation of homosexuality in the Dáil in 1993, he agreed with a statement by Brendan McGahon which reads: "Homosexuality is a departure from normality and while homosexuals deserve our compassion they do not deserve our tolerance" and who described homosexuals as being "like lefthand drivers driving on the right-hand side of the road".

Ahern himself added: "Will we eventually see the day in this country when, as has happened in the USA, homosexuals will seek the right to adopt children? We should think seriously about this possibility". Following his appointment as Minister responsible for equality, Ahern refused to be drawn on the matter and did not give an answer as to whether he still held these opinions.

== Civil partnership ==
Ahern was responsible for introducing legislation recognising civil partnerships for same-sex couples. He declared the legislation (Civil Partnership and Certain Rights and Obligations of Cohabitants Act 2010), which passed into law in July 2010, as "one of the most important pieces of civil rights legislation to be enacted since independence".

== Controversy over Michael McKevitt ==
Dermot Ahern denied claims that he had made representations to former Minister for Justice Michael McDowell on behalf of Michael McKevitt, who has been convicted of directing terrorism. He said that had merely forwarded an email from McKevitts' wife, Bernadette Sands McKevitt, who was a constituent in 2004.

His brother-in-law, Shane Coleman, is currently a journalist with Newstalk FM.

Political offices
Preceded by Vincent Brady	Government Chief Whip; 1991–1992	Succeeded by Noel Dempsey
Preceded by Vincent Brady	Minister of State at the Department of Defence; 1991–1992	Succeeded by Noel Dempsey
Preceded by Proinsias De Rossa as Minister for Social Welfare	Minister for Social, Community and Family Affairs; 1997–2002	Succeeded by Mary Coughlan as Minister for Social and Family Affairs
Preceded by Frank Fahey as Minister for the Marine and Natural Resources	Minister for Communications, Marine and Natural Resources; 2002–2004	Succeeded by Noel Dempsey
Preceded by Brian Cowen	Minister for Foreign Affairs; 2004–2008	Succeeded by Micheál Martin
Preceded by Brian Lenihan as Minister for Justice, Equality and Law Reform	Minister for Justice and Law Reform; 2008–2011	Succeeded by Brendan Smith

Dáil	Election	Deputy (Party)	Deputy (Party)	Deputy (Party)	Deputy (Party)	Deputy (Party)
4th	1923	Frank Aiken (Rep)	Peter Hughes (CnaG)	James Murphy (CnaG)	3 seats until 1977	
5th	1927 (Jun)	Frank Aiken (FF)	James Coburn (NL)	James Murphy (CnaG)	3 seats until 1977	
6th	1927 (Sep)	Frank Aiken (FF)	James Coburn (NL)	James Murphy (CnaG)	3 seats until 1977	
7th	1932	Frank Aiken (FF)	James Coburn (Ind.)	James Murphy (CnaG)	3 seats until 1977	
8th	1933	Frank Aiken (FF)	James Coburn (Ind.)	James Murphy (CnaG)	3 seats until 1977	
9th	1937	Frank Aiken (FF)	James Coburn (FG)	Laurence Walsh (FF)	3 seats until 1977	
10th	1938	Frank Aiken (FF)	James Coburn (FG)	Laurence Walsh (FF)	3 seats until 1977	
11th	1943	Frank Aiken (FF)	James Coburn (FG)	Roddy Connolly (Lab)	3 seats until 1977	
12th	1944	Frank Aiken (FF)	James Coburn (FG)	Laurence Walsh (FF)	3 seats until 1977	
13th	1948	Frank Aiken (FF)	James Coburn (FG)	Roddy Connolly (Lab)	3 seats until 1977	
14th	1951	Frank Aiken (FF)	James Coburn (FG)	Laurence Walsh (FF)	3 seats until 1977	
14th	1954 by-election	Frank Aiken (FF)	George Coburn (FG)	Laurence Walsh (FF)	3 seats until 1977	
15th	1954	Frank Aiken (FF)	George Coburn (FG)	Paddy Donegan (FG)	3 seats until 1977	
16th	1957	Frank Aiken (FF)	George Coburn (FG)	Pádraig Faulkner (Note: Faulker served as Ceann Comhairle in the 21st Dáil from 1977 to 1981, and was returned automatically at the 1981 election.) (FF)	3 seats until 1977	
17th	1961	Frank Aiken (FF)	Paddy Donegan (FG)	Pádraig Faulkner (FF)	3 seats until 1977	
18th	1965	Frank Aiken (FF)	Paddy Donegan (FG)	Pádraig Faulkner (FF)	3 seats until 1977	
19th	1969	Frank Aiken (FF)	Paddy Donegan (FG)	Pádraig Faulkner (FF)	3 seats until 1977	
20th	1973	Joseph Farrell (FF)	Paddy Donegan (FG)	Pádraig Faulkner (FF)	3 seats until 1977	
21st	1977	Joseph Farrell (FF)	Paddy Donegan (FG)	Pádraig Faulkner (FF)	Eddie Filgate (FF)	4 seats 1977–2011
22nd	1981	Paddy Agnew (AHB)	Bernard Markey (FG)	Pádraig Faulkner (FF)	Eddie Filgate (FF)	4 seats 1977–2011
23rd	1982 (Feb)	Thomas Bellew (FF)	Bernard Markey (FG)	Pádraig Faulkner (FF)	Eddie Filgate (FF)	4 seats 1977–2011
24th	1982 (Nov)	Michael Bell (Lab)	Brendan McGahon (FG)	Pádraig Faulkner (FF)	Séamus Kirk (Note: Kirk served as Ceann Comhairle in the 30th Dáil from 2009 to 2011, and was returned automatically at the 2011 election.) (FF)	4 seats 1977–2011
25th	1987	Michael Bell (Lab)	Brendan McGahon (FG)	Dermot Ahern (FF)	Séamus Kirk (FF)	4 seats 1977–2011
26th	1989	Michael Bell (Lab)	Brendan McGahon (FG)	Dermot Ahern (FF)	Séamus Kirk (FF)	4 seats 1977–2011
27th	1992	Michael Bell (Lab)	Brendan McGahon (FG)	Dermot Ahern (FF)	Séamus Kirk (FF)	4 seats 1977–2011
28th	1997	Michael Bell (Lab)	Brendan McGahon (FG)	Dermot Ahern (FF)	Séamus Kirk (FF)	4 seats 1977–2011
29th	2002	Arthur Morgan (SF)	Fergus O'Dowd (FG)	Dermot Ahern (FF)	Séamus Kirk (FF)	4 seats 1977–2011
30th	2007	Arthur Morgan (SF)	Fergus O'Dowd (FG)	Dermot Ahern (FF)	Séamus Kirk (FF)	4 seats 1977–2011
31st	2011	Gerry Adams (SF)	Fergus O'Dowd (FG)	Ged Nash (Lab)	Séamus Kirk (FF)	Peter Fitzpatrick (FG)
32nd	2016	Gerry Adams (SF)	Fergus O'Dowd (FG)	Declan Breathnach (FF)	Imelda Munster (SF)	Peter Fitzpatrick (FG)
33rd	2020	Ruairí Ó Murchú (SF)	Fergus O'Dowd (FG)	Ged Nash (Lab)	Imelda Munster (SF)	Peter Fitzpatrick (Ind.)
34th	2024	Ruairí Ó Murchú (SF)	Paula Butterly (FG)	Ged Nash (Lab)	Joanna Byrne (SF)	Erin McGreehan (FF)
