= 2009 Irish emergency budget =

Emergency government budget by Ireland in 2009

- Presented: 7 April 2009
- Country: Ireland
- Parliament: 30th Dáil
- Government: 28th Government of Ireland
- Party: Fianna Fáil; Green Party; Progressive Democrats
- Minister for Finance: Brian Lenihan
- Website: Budget 2009

The 2009 Irish emergency budget refers to the delivery of an emergency government budget by the Government of Ireland on 7 April 2009, its second in six months. It was also the second overall budget to be delivered by Fianna Fáil's Brian Lenihan as Minister for Finance. The emergency budget announcement involved significant tax rises and a decrease in public spending. Prior to its unveiling, it was predicted to be the most severe budget in decades, with The Independent suggesting in its aftermath that it was the most severe in the country's history.

== Background ==
=== 2008 emergency budget ===
The Irish government budget for 2009 was delivered on 14 October 2008, as the first budget in the tenure of Brian Lenihan as Minister for Finance and the first of the Taoiseach Brian Cowen's tenure. It was brought forward from its usual December date due to the 2008 financial crisis. The budget, labelled "the toughest in many years", included a number of controversial measures such as a proposed income levy which was eventually restructured and the withdrawal of previously promised HPV vaccines for schoolgirls. Other results of the budget included a new income levy being imposed on all workers above a specified threshold and the closure of a number of military barracks near the border with Northern Ireland.

== Budget summary ==
The April 2009 emergency budget introduced a number of new measures. The announcements included:

- Rates of the previously introduced income levy doubled to 2%, 4% and 6%.
- Excise duty on a regular packet of 20 cigarettes was increased by 25 cents.
- Excise duty on a litre of diesel was increased by 5c.
- A new "asset management agency" established to remove bad loans from Irish banks.
- Early childcare supplement decreased by one half from 1 May 2009 and abolished entirely by 2010. This will be replaced by a subsidy towards pre-school for 3- and 4-year-olds.
- No further increases in social welfare for at least two years. Jobseekers' allowance for under 20s was reduced by half.

== Details ==
The cabinet met on the afternoon of 6 April 2009 to finalise the emergency budget. The budget was preceded by an announcement that all twenty of Ireland's Ministers of State were to resign to be replaced by fifteen within a fortnight. A proposal was also announced which would see the transfer of approximately €80–90 billion of bad loans from Irish banks to a new National Asset Management Agency (NAMA) The Department of Transport announced a reduction in funding of €315 million. €150 million would be deducted from the €448 million earmarked for local and regional roads, with a further €150 million deducted from funds set aside for public transport infrastructure. The typical person on the minimum wage of €17,500 per annum would have to pay 2% taxes, a person on €50,000 per annum would have to pay 4% taxes and a person on €300,000 per annum would have to pay 9% taxes.

The Taoiseach Brian Cowen called the budget one of the toughest in several years but insisted that the emergency measures were necessary. He defended the taxation increases by stating that high earners would pay a significant amount of the new taxes. Brian Lenihan said "fairness means you cannot shuffle off responsibility to somebody else." In its analysis, The Irish Times compared the budget to that of Ernest Blythe, who served as finance minister in W. T. Cosgrave's first government in 1923 and attempted to cut the old age pension, as well as to Lenihan's own October 2008 budget which led to him retracting his attempts to abolish automatic free healthcare for over seventies.

== International reaction ==
The 2009 emergency budget received widespread international coverage. The Times featured a brief video clip on its website, describing what the "bust budget" would mean for the economy of the United Kingdom. The economics editor of the BBC reported that there were lessons for the United Kingdom to learn from this emergency procedure. The Financial Times stated that the increased taxes contained within the budget would mainly affect the "middle classes" of Ireland. Reuters reported that the European Commission viewed the budget as a form of "decisive action". The Independent described Ireland's financial situation as "the dismal business of adjusting to a generational drop in living standards with the end of the Celtic Tiger boom and the prospect of a new era of austerity". The Independent also carried a cartoon of Ireland's Taoiseach Brian Cowen measuring a lifeless Celtic Tiger before deciding that it would have to go on a diet at the present time. Meanwhile, The Irish Times disagreed with an assessment on the website of the Toronto Star which said the budget was a "painstakingly negotiated plan" which involved "hefty hikes in income tax and service spending cuts" which it said were intended to restore confidence in the "shaky finances of debt-stricken Ireland".

== See also ==
- 2010 Irish budget – a later Budget delivered by the Irish Government in 2009
