= Salient Rulings of the Chair =

Salient Rulings of the Chair (Irish: Rialuithe Suntasacha an Chathaoirligh) are a set of rulings by the Ceann Comhairle regarding the interpretations of the standing orders of Dáil Éireann.

Standing orders are the rules governing the running of the Dáil, but are not complete in themselves. They have to be interpreted in the light of rulings by the Ceann Comhairle, which are contained in the document. It covers where people are to sit in the Dáil to how debates are conducted. It states that TDs should refer to each other with the prefix "Deputy" before their name.

== Disorderly behaviour ==
=== Banned terms ===
Some terms are explicitly banned:

- brat or acting the brat
- corner boy
- communist
- corner boy tactics
- fascist
- gurrier
- guttersnipe
- hypocrite, bloody hypocrites or hypocrisy
- rat
- scumbag
- yahoo

=== Other restrictions ===
Accusing other TDs of lying, taking bribes or murder is considered disorderly conduct.

Threatening another TD is disorderly behaviour.

Referring to relatives of TDs is disorderly, as is referring to TDs behaviour outside the Dáil.

The President should not be criticised.

Judges should not be criticised.

== Incident ==
In 2009 Paul Gogarty criticised Emmet Stagg during a debate on social welfare cuts by saying "Fuck you Deputy Stagg, Fuck you.". He apologised for his comment. It turned out that the comment was not in breach of the Salient Rules as they stood at the time.
