= Brian Lenihan Jnr =

Irish politician (1959–2011)

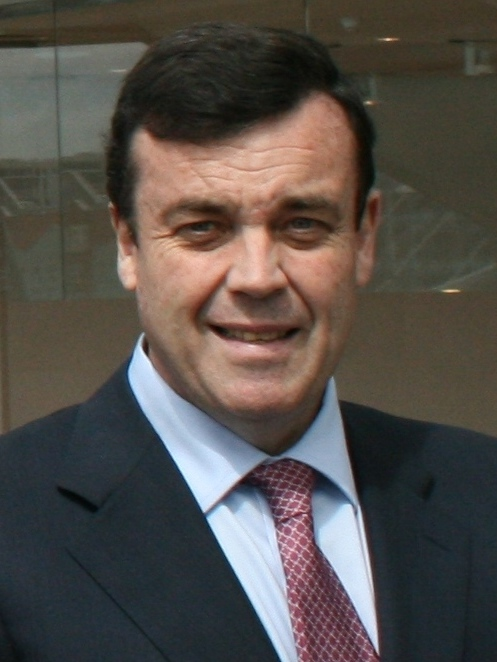
- Lenihan in July 2010

Minister for Finance
- In office 7 May 2008 – 9 March 2011
- Taoiseach: Brian Cowen
- Preceded by: Brian Cowen
- Succeeded by: Michael Noonan

Deputy leader of Fianna Fáil
- In office 15 March 2011 – 10 June 2011
- Leader: Micheál Martin
- Preceded by: Mary Hanafin
- Succeeded by: Éamon Ó Cuív

Minister for Justice, Equality and Law Reform
- In office 14 June 2007 – 7 May 2008
- Taoiseach: Bertie Ahern
- Preceded by: Michael McDowell
- Succeeded by: Dermot Ahern

Minister of State
- 2002–2007: Children

Teachta Dála
- In office April 1996 – 10 June 2011
- Constituency: Dublin West

Personal details
- Born: 21 May 1959 Dublin, Ireland
- Died: 10 June 2011 (aged 52) Castleknock, Dublin, Ireland
- Party: Fianna Fáil
- Spouse: Patricia Ryan (m. 1997)
- Children: 2
- Parent: Brian Lenihan Snr (father)
- Relatives: Patrick Lenihan (grandfather); Mary O'Rourke (aunt); Conor Lenihan (brother)
- Education: Trinity College Dublin; Sidney Sussex College

Brian Joseph Lenihan (21 May 1959 – 10 June 2011) was an Irish Fianna Fáil politician who served as Minister for Finance from 2008 to 2011, Deputy leader of Fianna Fáil from March 2011 to June 2011, Minister for Justice, Equality and Law Reform from 2007 to 2008 and Minister of State for Children from 2002 to 2007. He served as a Teachta Dála (TD) for Dublin West from 1996 until his death in 2011.

== Early and private life ==
Born in Dublin in 1959, Lenihan grew up in Athlone, County Westmeath until the age of 12, attending the local Marist Brothers primary school. He was then educated at Belvedere College, where he was school captain, then at Trinity College Dublin where he obtained an LL.B. (first class). He was elected a foundation scholar of the college in 1979. While in Trinity, he was Treasurer of the College Historical Society. Lenihan was later awarded an LL.M. (first class) at Sidney Sussex College, Cambridge and was called to the Irish Bar by the Honorable Society of King's Inns.

He began lecturing law at Trinity College Dublin in 1984 and in the same year was called to the Irish Bar. From 1992 to 1995, he was a member of the Criminal Injuries Compensation Tribunal and the Garda Síochána Complaints Appeal Board, and in 1997 he became a Senior Counsel.

Lenihan married Circuit Court judge Patricia Ryan in 1997; and they had two children.

In December 2009, he was diagnosed with pancreatic cancer.

== Early political career ==
Lenihan is a member of an Irish political family. His father Brian Lenihan Snr, first elected in 1957, was a cabinet Minister for over twenty-five years, Tánaiste, MEP, and a candidate for president in the 1990 election. His grandfather was Patrick Lenihan, who followed his son into the Dáil, serving as a TD from 1965 until 1970. Lenihan's aunt Mary O'Rourke was first elected as a TD in 1982, served for a time in the Senate, and is also a former cabinet minister. His brother Conor was a TD from 1997 to 2011 and served as a Minister of State. Despite these facts, Lenihan said that he resented any implication that he was a member of the political establishment.

Lenihan first held political office in 1996 when he was asked to stand in the Dublin West by-election, which was prompted by the death of his father. Noel Dempsey, who was Fianna Fáil's Director of Elections in the contest, did not expect his party to hold the seat. Lenihan topped the poll, with 252 more first-preference votes than Joe Higgins of Militant Labour, and was elected on the 11th count. Following his re-election at the 1997 general election Lenihan became Chairman of the All-Party Oireachtas Committee on the Constitution. He served in this position until 2002 when he was appointed Minister of State for Children.

Lenihan was often deployed as a representative of government on topical issues or television shows, and was known for giving his personal opinion on some matters. He was involved in a dispute with the Labour Party over its leader Pat Rabbitte's desire for a presidential election in 2004; Lenihan said the party was "turning the presidency into a political football". He defended the government again in February 2005, this time against Sinn Féin who he suggested were "milking the peace process for political gain". He would later suggest his preference for becoming the Opposition if the alternative was to enter government with Sinn Féin. When three Irishmen fled convictions on terrorism charges they had received in Colombia, the Minister described their return as "most unhelpful to the peace process". Lenihan spoke at the Fianna Fáil Ardfheis in Killarney on 22 October 2005, and at the Ardfheis in Citywest on 24 March 2007. Appearing on The Week in Politics in the wake of unfounded allegations published by a number of Sunday newspapers on Liam Lawlor's death in October 2005, Lenihan said Lawlor's legacy would be the setting up of a Press Council to deal with such matters as they arose in future and was also among the politicians who paid tribute to Lawlor in Dáil Éireann. When other Fianna Fáil ministers were silent, Lenihan stressed the acceptance of illegal payments by former Taoiseach Bertie Ahern in Manchester was "unthinkable", a comment highlighted positively by Pat Rabbitte in Dáil Éireann following Ahern's public apology in October 2006. Lenihan denied Brian Cowen was "setting a bad example" following a 2007 Hot Press interview in which the future Taoiseach admitted smoking cannabis in his student past. He was involved in the negotiations between Fianna Fáil and the Green Party to form a government in 2007.

=== Minister for Children (2002–2007) ===
In 2002, Lenihan was appointed as Minister of State at the Department of Health and Children, at the Department of Justice, Equality and Law Reform and at the Department of Education and Science, with special responsibility for children.

In this capacity, Lenihan announced a new news television programme targeting young people, dealt with matters relating to the internet and pedophilia, announced changes to Ireland's adoption laws and increased the numbers of gardaí employed in the Central Vetting Unit which assesses childcare workers. In 2005, Lenihan was permitted to attend cabinet meetings, despite not being a member of the government. He was involved in a proposal to outlaw domestic spanking in June 2005. On 25 October 2005, he expressed upset as a government representative at the "repeated failure and gross dereliction of duties" highlighted in the Ferns Report. He spoke at the Irish Nurses Organisation conference in May 2006 in place of the Minister for Health and Children Mary Harney. He then addressed a United Nations committee on children's rights in September 2006. On 16 October 2006, Lenihan announced that legislation increasing the age of criminal responsibility by five years from 7 to 12 would come into law immediately. Before leaving office in 2007, he announced several new items, including a review of pedophilia and an increase in the number of judges and other officials working with criminal children. He received criticism from a number of nurses in a disagreement over their working hours at another conference of the Irish Nurses Organisation on 10 May 2007.

== Cabinet career (2007–2011) ==
=== Minister for Justice (2007–2008) ===
After the 2007 general election, Fianna Fáil formed a new coalition government under Taoiseach Bertie Ahern with the Green Party and the Progressive Democrats, and the support of Independent TDs. Lenihan was appointed as Minister for Justice, Equality and Law Reform, the only Fianna Fáil TD to be promoted to the cabinet. Lenihan's father had held the post from 1964 to 1968, making them the only father-son pair to have held that office. Lenihan stated that a referendum on children's rights would take place. His first function as Minister for Justice was to attend the graduation of newly trained members of the Garda Síochána Reserve on 16 June 2007. As Minister for Justice, Lenihan was involved in several high-profile deportation cases.

=== Minister for Finance (2008–2011) ===
Considered a "close ally" of Brian Cowen, Lenihan was promoted to the office of Minister for Finance, following the election of Cowen as Taoiseach on 7 May 2008. His 2006 intervention to assist with the development of emergency legislation when it emerged rapists were being freed from jail was seen as a major factor in his promotion to the Department of Finance. Lenihan's time as Minister for Finance was dominated by the financial and banking crises which faced Ireland in the late 2000s. He unveiled three government budgets within the space of fourteen months, nationalised Anglo Irish Bank and unveiled the National Asset Management Agency or NAMA.

==== 2008 Bank guarantee ====
On 18 September 2008, Lenihan issued an emergency phone call to Director-General of RTÉ Cathal Goan after an edition of the radio phone-in programme Liveline, presented by Joe Duffy, led to mass concerns that Ireland's banking system was on the verge of collapse. The Minister warned in an interview the following day with Economics Editor for RTÉ George Lee that the public need not react "on the basis of unfounded allegations made on radio programmes". On 29 September, Lenihan agreed to issue a broad state guarantee of Irish banks for one year, with the intention of recapitalising them to enable them to continue to lend into the Irish economy. The decision was highly contentious and required a sharp recovery of the world economy that did not occur, but the guarantees were renewed in 2009, 2010, and 2011.

In February 2008, an Irish Department of Finance presentation stated that: ".. any requirement to provide open-ended/legally binding State guarantees which would expose the Exchequer to the risk of very significant costs are not regarded as part of the toolkit for successful crisis management and resolution."

The scope of the guarantee - whether it could, or should, have been limited or broad - was examined by an Oireachtas committee in 2010. By late 2010, the costs were so high that the government sought help from the ECB and IMF (see below). By mid-2011 the banks' debts were downgraded to junk status.

==== Budget 2009 ====
Lenihan delivered the 2009 Budget on 14 October 2008 – the budget had been called early due to the worsening economic conditions. The controversial measure of removing Medical Cards from most over-70-year-olds (by means testing) caused a massive public outcry, culminating in a backlash against the government and backbench unease; one Fianna Fáil TD, Joe Behan, left the party in protest.

Public outcry meant the government had to twice revise the budget in an attempt to satisfy pensioners, unions, and backbenchers. Lenihan was not present at the press conference, which included Brian Cowen, John Gormley and Mary Harney, to announce the removal of minimum wage employees from the 1 per cent income levy and a promise that 95 per cent of senior citizens would keep the medical card.

==== Second (emergency) Budget 2009 and NAMA ====
On 7 April 2009, Lenihan delivered an emergency budget overriding the measures previously announced, amounting to a further €3.25bn increases in taxes and reductions in spending programmes in the current year, as well as corresponding fiscal changes to future years. Explaining the purpose of the budget changes before the Dáil, he said: "We must stabilise our public finances. Until we show that we can put our own house in order, we cannot expect those who have invested here and who might invest here in the future to have confidence in us".

The emergency budget also saw the announcement of the National Asset Management Agency (NAMA), designed to house banking assets. The Cabinet approved 150 pages of draft legislation outlined by Lenihan at a meeting in late July 2009; it was published later that week. In September 2009, Lenihan announced €54 billion would be given by NAMA to Irish banks in exchange for an estimated €77 billion in loans. The legislation enacting NAMA was passed in Dáil Éireann and Seanad Éireann before being signed by President Mary McAleese during November 2009. Lenihan identified nine prospective NAMA board members on 22 December 2009.

In February 2010, Cowen defended his claim that NAMA would increase the supply of credit into the economy, despite the International Monetary Fund (IMF) saying it would not lead to any significant increase. "People should contemplate what level of credit accessibility we'd have in this economy without NAMA," he said. "It's not just sufficient in itself obviously for credit flow, it's certainly an important and necessary part of restructuring our banking system, of that there's no doubt, in terms of improving as a location for funding of banking operations," said Cowen. He previously said that the government's objective in restructuring the banks through NAMA was to "generate more access to credit for Irish business at this critical time". In September 2009, Lenihan expressed a similar view, saying it would lead to more lending for business and households. Cowen was responding to reports published on 8 February that the IMF had told Lenihan in April 2009 that the NAMA would not lead to a significant increase in lending by the banks. The comments, which appear in internal Department of Finance documents released under the Freedom of Information Act, were made by senior IMF official Steven Seelig who will join the board of NAMA in May 2010. Minutes of a private meeting at the department between Lenihan and IMF officials on 29 April 2009 last state that the "IMF (Seelig) do not believe that Nama will result in a significant increase in bank lending in Ireland". The Government has maintained that NAMA's purchase of bad loans from the banks with State bonds would increase the flow of credit in the economy since the plan was unveiled in April 2009. Speaking at the publication of the NAMA legislation in September 2009, Lenihan said it would "strengthen and improve" the funding positions of the banks "so that they can lend to viable businesses and households". The IMF estimated in their published report the domestic banks would face losses of up to €35 billion, though the department pointed out this would be partly funded from operating profits and provisions already taken against some loan losses.

In July 2010, after a revised business plan was published it was revealed that it is now predicting a possible profit of €1bn, with the possibility of losses of up to €800m, after an initial projection of more than €4bn in profit. The plan published today updates and revises the interim business plan published in October of last year which was prepared on the basis of information supplied at that time by the five participating institutions (Anglo Irish Bank, AIB, Bank of Ireland, EBS and Irish Nationwide) and in advance of the detailed examination of any of the key loans by NAMA. Minister Lenihan has denied that the Government got its sums wrong on NAMA. The original business plan estimated a profit of €4.8bn based on a rise in assets value of 10%. Today's revised figures say that if they recover the full value of the loans plus 10% it will result in a profit of €3.9bn. NAMA chairman Frank Daly said the plan confirmed that the five institutions covered by NAMA had not disclosed or had been unaware of the extent of the 2008 financial crisis afflicting their borrowers. He said the banks had shown "remarkable generosity" towards their borrowers, adding that NAMA had no intention of maintaining that approach. 'To say the least we are extremely disappointed and disturbed to find that, only months after being led to believe that 40% of loans were income producing, the real figure is actually 25%.

==== Budget 2010 ====
On 9 December 2009, the government budget for 2010 was delivered. Referred to at home and abroad in such terms as "the harshest budget in decades", "the most austere Budget in the history of the State" and "what can only be described as one of the toughest Budgets in the history of the State", it was marked by pay cuts for the public sector, and social welfare cuts. Also announced at the same time was €70 million for those impacted by floods which had affected parts of the country. Global investors approved the measures introduced by Lenihan, with Irish government bonds receiving a boost following the Budget.

==== Citigroup conference call ====
On 1 October 2010, Lenihan was in a telephone conference with Citigroup when due to a mistake made by Citigroup, the bank's clients were all able to be heard on the line. As the 200–500 investors realised within 2 minutes their lines were not muted, many began to heckle Lenihan. Some traders made what the Telegraph described as "chimp sounds", while another cried out "dive, dive". Another was heard saying "short Ireland" before adding "why not short Citi too?". Another investor on the line stated "this is the worst conference call ever". After 20 minutes, the call was restarted, with the clients now muted.

On 2 October 2010, Lenihan denied that he was heckled, with his spokesperson stating: "A number of media organisations were on the call. None offered a similar analysis to the Telegraph, which was not on the call. At the end of the call, spreads on Irish bonds narrowed which indicated that the 200 investors on the call were reassured."

The Department of Finance has stated that the reports were inaccurate, stating: "The Minister was not interrupted as reported by the Telegraph. There was no heckling – indeed, participants congratulated the Minister and the NTMA."

=== EU-IMF bailout, November 2010 ===
As the Irish banks were unable to raise fresh capital in the bond markets on the expiry of the one-year bank guarantee (see above), in September 2010 the government needed to provide them with further billions, amounting to a budget deficit of 32% of GDP. This led in turn to questions about the value of Irish government bonds, and they were re-rated to AA− on 6 October. From 21 November negotiations started with teams from the ECB and the IMF, resulting in an agreement on 28 November.

The suddenness of the €85 billion bailout deal led to worries that Irish sovereignty had been lost, and that the Irish economy might not grow fast enough to afford the bailout costs. Others complained that the new regime would increase taxes and reduce social welfare payments at a time of recession. The deal became a part of the European sovereign debt crisis debate.

As a result of the bailout required following Lenihan's renewed bank guarantee, the government's coalition partner, the Green Party, called for an early election and withdrew from the government on 23 January 2011. The ensuing 2011 general election, on 25 February, led to a loss of 75% in the number of Fianna Fáil deputies returned to parliament in the election and the complete loss of all seats by their Green Party coalition partner.

== International comments ==
=== Financial Times ranking ===
In 2009 and 2010, the Financial Times annual survey of the 19 Eurogroup finance ministers, ranked by European economists, named Brian Lenihan as the Eurozone's worst Finance Minister.

=== Vanity Fair: Lenihan is "tricky" ===
The March 2011 issue of Vanity Fair described Lenihan as "tricky," for allegedly manipulating his meetings with the members of the Dáil so that when they emerge, they are the ones who must announce the bad news about the latest budget cuts and tax hikes to the media (and thus bear the brunt of the anger and blame for the austerity measures). Lenihan's role in post-collapse Ireland is likened in one particularly lurid passage as "normalising a freak show" and attempting to assure the Irish that they didn't all just see what they saw. Yet, he is also described as "the last remaining Irish politician anywhere near power whose mere appearance does not cause people on the streets of Dublin to explode with either scorn or laughter" because of his perceived innocence and his well-publicised illness.

== Opposition (2011) ==
Lenihan barely held onto his seat in the 2011 general election. He was declared elected on the fifth count without reaching the quota with his first preference vote declining from 32.7% in 2007 to just 15.2%. He was the only Fianna Fáil TD, out of 47 outgoing TDs in Dublin constituencies, returned in the Dublin region.

He was the deputy leader of Fianna Fáil and party Spokesperson for Finance until his death.

Lenihan contested the 2011 Fianna Fáil leadership election on 26 January 2011, losing to Micheál Martin.

=== April 2011 interview ===
In an April 2011 interview, Lenihan claimed the European Central Bank forced Ireland into taking a bailout and rejected claims by a senior ECB figure that the bank warned Ireland in mid-2010 of the dangers it faced. He has also accused members of the ECB executives of briefing against Ireland and of "betrayal". Lenihan criticised some of the 17 governing board members of the bank for the "damaging" manner in which they had briefed some media about Ireland. He said, "On the betrayal issue, I did feel that some bank governors should not be speaking out of turn and that only the president should speak for the bank." The position of the ECB on Ireland's seeking of assistance was different from that of the European Commission, said Lenihan. "I don't think the commission were anxious to bounce member states into a programme. "That was my strong impression from my discussions with Commissioner Rehn." he said, adding that "the ECB clearly subscribed to a different view." He gave a graphic description of his feelings when the bailout talks were concluded. "I've a very vivid memory of going to Brussels on the final Monday to sign the agreement and being on my own at the airport and looking at the snow gradually thawing and thinking to myself, this is terrible. No Irish Minister has ever had to do this before."

== Health and lifestyle ==
After a visit by Lenihan to David McWilliams's house, McWilliams publicly claimed that Lenihan had eaten large doses of raw garlic during the visit and that Lenihan had said he had developed the habit since becoming Minister for Finance. An unnamed source described in the Irish Examiner as "close to Mr Lenihan" subsequently said: "It's true he does like eating garlic, but he doesn't chew it like gum – it's good for the blood, apparently". Then Minister of State Pat Carey said on the radio at the time that Lenihan "constantly chew[ed] garlic".

Lenihan was hospitalised on 16 December 2009, complaining of insomnia and a possible hernia. Surgery, described as "a minor procedure that was brought forward", was performed. Leader of the Opposition Enda Kenny wished him well in a speech. On 26 December 2009, TV3 reported that Lenihan had been diagnosed with pancreatic cancer. The Sunday Times then reported that "a number of authoritative sources" had said the claim was true. Public service broadcaster RTÉ stated that Lenihan had contracted what it described as "a serious condition". The Government Press Secretary stated that the health of a politician is a private affair. The "unwarranted intrusion" by TV3 was met with disapproval – even by opposition politicians; Labour Party deputy leader and Finance Spokesperson Joan Burton offered her condolences: "It's certainly not a departure in the media that I would welcome. I'm really shocked that a story like that could be broadcast at Christmas". However, the journalist in question who made the disclosure, Ursula Halligan, received support for report from many publications and journalists, including the political bi-weekly Village magazine, Ger Colleran (then editor of the Irish Daily Star), The Irish Times and The Phoenix magazine, who stated that "If a report of the finance minister facing a serious illness while simultaneously grappling with the biggest financial crisis in the history of the state is not in the public interest, then nothing is".

In a personal statement on 4 January 2010, detailing the precise nature of his illness, Lenihan said he underwent tests prior to Christmas which identified a blockage at the entrance to his pancreas. He said cancerous tissue was identified in the material that had caused the blockage, and he intended to begin treatment for cancer. Having discussed the matter with his doctors and the Taoiseach, he said he will continue on in the finance portfolio and "to fulfil the essential functions of my office".

=== Death ===
Lenihan died on 10 June 2011, at the age of 52, from pancreatic cancer. It was reported that he died in the early hours of the morning at his home in west Dublin. He was survived by his wife, their two children, his mother, three brothers and one sister. His death received attention from the international media. President Mary McAleese said she was saddened by the death of "such a young and talented public servant". Thousands of people queued to sign books of condolence nationwide, with the figure soon reaching 10,000 while thousands of others clicked a tribute page on Facebook. Thousands of people also visited Lenihan's Dublin constituency office, travelling from all over Ireland including County Cork, County Galway and County Donegal. He was buried in the Church of Ireland graveyard at St. David's Church, Kilsallaghan, County Dublin, near where he grew up. He had chosen the site during a visit to the graveyard the previous December.

== See also ==
- Families in the Oireachtas

Political offices
Preceded by Mary Hanafin	Minister of State for Children; 2002–2007	Succeeded by Brendan Smith
Preceded by Michael McDowell	Minister for Justice, Equality and Law Reform; 2007–2008	Succeeded by Dermot Ahern
Preceded by Brian Cowen	Minister for Finance; 2008–2011	Succeeded by Michael Noonan
Party political offices
Preceded by Mary Hanafin	Deputy leader of Fianna Fáil; March–June 2011	Succeeded by Éamon Ó Cuív

Dáil	Election	Deputy (Party)	Deputy (Party)	Deputy (Party)	Deputy (Party)	Deputy (Party)
22nd	1981	Jim Mitchell (FG)	Brian Lenihan Snr (FF)	Richard Burke (FG)	Eileen Lemass (FF)	Brian Fleming (FG)
23rd	1982 (Feb)	Jim Mitchell (FG)	Brian Lenihan Snr (FF)	Richard Burke (FG)	Liam Lawlor (FF)	Brian Fleming (FG)
23rd	1982 by-election	Jim Mitchell (FG)	Brian Lenihan Snr (FF)	Liam Skelly (FG)	Liam Lawlor (FF)	Brian Fleming (FG)
24th	1982 (Nov)	Jim Mitchell (FG)	Brian Lenihan Snr (FF)	Liam Skelly (FG)	Eileen Lemass (FF)	Tomás Mac Giolla (WP)
25th	1987	Jim Mitchell (FG)	Brian Lenihan Snr (FF)	Pat O'Malley (PDs)	Liam Lawlor (FF)	Tomás Mac Giolla (WP)
26th	1989	Jim Mitchell (FG)	Brian Lenihan Snr (FF)	Austin Currie (FG)	Liam Lawlor (FF)	Tomás Mac Giolla (WP)
27th	1992	Joan Burton (Lab)	Brian Lenihan Snr (FF)	Austin Currie (FG)	Liam Lawlor (FF)	4 seats 1992–2002
27th	1996 by-election	Joan Burton (Lab)	Brian Lenihan Jnr (FF)	Austin Currie (FG)	Liam Lawlor (FF)	4 seats 1992–2002
28th	1997	Joe Higgins (SP)	Brian Lenihan Jnr (FF)	Austin Currie (FG)	Liam Lawlor (FF)	4 seats 1992–2002
29th	2002	Joe Higgins (SP)	Brian Lenihan Jnr (FF)	Joan Burton (Lab)	3 seats 2002–2011	
30th	2007	Leo Varadkar (FG)	Brian Lenihan Jnr (FF)	Joan Burton (Lab)	3 seats 2002–2011	
31st	2011	Leo Varadkar (FG)	Brian Lenihan Jnr (FF)	Joan Burton (Lab)	Joe Higgins (SP)	4 seats 2011–2024
31st	2011 by-election	Leo Varadkar (FG)	Patrick Nulty (Lab)	Joan Burton (Lab)	Joe Higgins (SP)	4 seats 2011–2024
31st	2014 by-election	Leo Varadkar (FG)	Ruth Coppinger (SP)	Joan Burton (Lab)	Joe Higgins (SP)	4 seats 2011–2024
32nd	2016	Leo Varadkar (FG)	Ruth Coppinger (AAA–PBP)	Joan Burton (Lab)	Jack Chambers (FF)	4 seats 2011–2024
33rd	2020	Leo Varadkar (FG)	Paul Donnelly (SF)	Roderic O'Gorman (GP)	Jack Chambers (FF)	4 seats 2011–2024
34th	2024	Emer Currie (FG)	Paul Donnelly (SF)	Roderic O'Gorman (GP)	Jack Chambers (FF)	Ruth Coppinger (PBP–S)
