= St. Camillus College =

Private school in Pangasinan, Philippines

Coordinates: 16°02′04″N 120°29′40″E

Logo of St. Camillus College of Manaoag

St. Camillus College of Manaoag is an educational institution in Northern Luzon. It was established in the year 2001 by its Founder, Father Luigi Galvani, MI as a day care center serving poor children in the community and now has grown into a full-fledged college with curricular offerings from pre-elementary to college level. It is located at the Pilgrimage Town of Manaoag, Pangasinan, Philippines.

St. Camillus College of Manaoag (SCCM) is supervised by the Camillian Family Foundation (Inc.) in Manaoag which is the lay organization of the Congregation of Catholic Priests, Brothers and Sisters known as the Order of St. Camillus (OSC).
