= Trevor Sargent =

Irish former politician (born 1960)

The Reverend Trevor Sargent
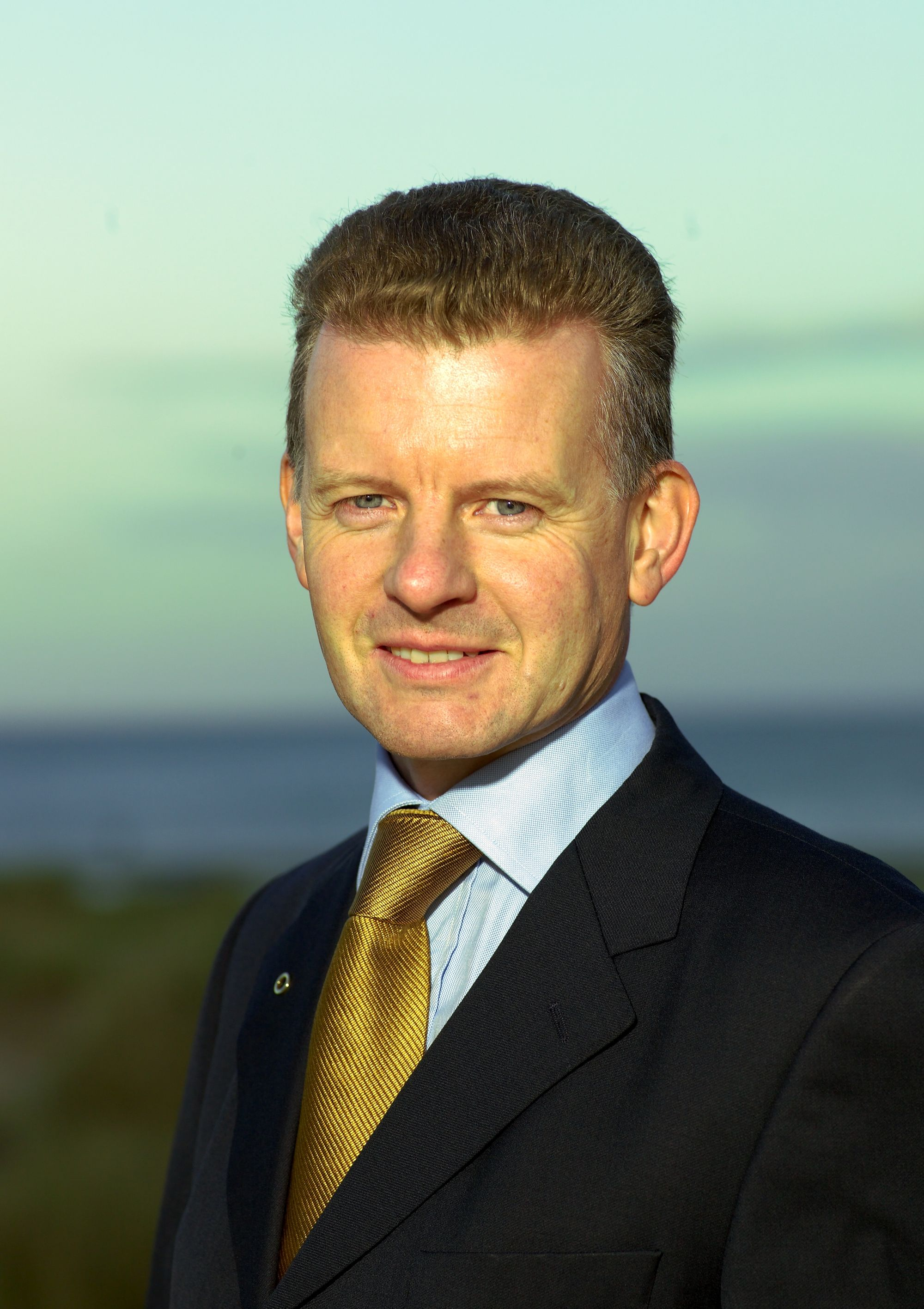
- Sargent in 2006

Minister of State
- 2009–2010: Health and Children
- 2007–2010: Agriculture, Fisheries and Food

Leader of the Green Party
- In office 6 October 2001 – 17 July 2007
- Deputy: Mary White
- Preceded by: New office
- Succeeded by: John Gormley

Teachta Dála
- In office November 1992 – February 2011
- Constituency: Dublin North

Personal details
- Born: 26 July 1960 (age 66) County Dublin, Ireland
- Party: Green Party
- Spouses: Heidi Bedell (m. 1998; div. 2013); Aine Neville (m. 2014)
- Education: Church of Ireland College of Education; Church of Ireland Theological Institute; Trinity College Dublin

Trevor Sargent (born 26 July 1960) is a minister of the Church of Ireland and a former Irish Green Party politician who served as a Minister of State from 2007 to 2010 and Leader of the Green Party from 2001 to 2007. He served as a Teachta Dála (TD) for the Dublin North constituency from 1992 to 2011.

== Career ==
=== Teaching career ===
Sargent trained as a primary school teacher in the Church of Ireland College of Education. In 1981, he started teaching in the Model School, Dunmanway, County Cork. In 1983, he was appointed Principal of St George's National School, Balbriggan, County Dublin. He is a fluent Irish speaker.

=== Local politics ===
A committed environmentalist since the early 1980s, Trevor Sargent first became politically active when he joined the Green Party in 1982. However, it was not until 1989 that the Green Party made an impact in national politics, winning its first seat in Dáil Éireann through Roger Garland. In that same year, Sargent stood for in the European Parliament election in Dublin, but was unsuccessful. Two years later in 1991, he was elected to Dublin County Council.

At a meeting of the council, he waved a cheque he had received in the post from a builder who was seeking to rezone land for a housing development. When he asked the other members whether any of them had also received cheques, he was assaulted by a number of his fellow councillors. Sargent alleged that Fianna Fáil Councillor Don Lydon put him in a headlock and attempted to snatch the cheque from him. This is one of the incidents which eventually led to the creation of the Mahon Tribunal to look into planning matters in Dublin County Council.

=== Dáil Éireann ===
At the 1992 general election, he was elected to Dáil Éireann and retained his seat at the 1997, 2002 and 2007 general elections, topping the poll in 2002. Having been elected to the Dáil, he resigned his county council seat in keeping with Green Party policy on dual mandates. This became a legal requirement in 2003. Having been the only Green Party member of the Dáil between 1992 and 1997, Sargent was joined in 1997 by John Gormley, and in 2002 by an additional four Green Party TDs.

At a special Leadership Convention in Kilkenny on 6 October 2001, Sargent was elected the first official leader of the Green Party. He was re-elected to this position in 2003 and again in 2005. Ahead of the 2007 general election, Sargent had committed that he would not lead the party into government with Fianna Fáil. After the election, the Green Party entered talks on forming a coalition government with Fianna Fáil. A programme for government was agreed after over a week of negotiations, which was ratified by 86% by a special conference of the Green Party membership, following passionate endorsements of the deal by Sargent and the rest of the Green leadership. However, Sargent announced that he would resign his position as leader of the party and would not accept a seat in the cabinet. He was succeeded as leader by John Gormley.

The 27th Government of Ireland led by Bertie Ahern was formed on 14 June 2007, with the Greens given two seats at cabinet. On 20 June 2007, Sargent was appointed Minister of State at the Department of Agriculture, Fisheries and Food with responsibility for Food and Horticulture. He was re-appointed by the 28th Government of Ireland when Brian Cowen succeeded Ahern as Taoiseach on 7 May 2008. When Cowen reduced the number of Ministers of State on 22 April 2009, Sargent was given the additional post of Minister of State at the Department of Health and Children with responsibility for Food Safety.

On 23 February 2010, he resigned as a Minister of State when he admitted unlawfully contacting Gardaí about a criminal case involving a constituent who had been assaulted. He lost his seat at the 2011 general election, along with all the other Green Party TDs.

=== After politics ===
In March 2012, he published his debut book, Trevor's Kitchen Garden, a week-by-week manual and diary in book form about growing food in a small garden, based on his blog of the same name.

Sargent was trained as a Church of Ireland cleric, at the Church of Ireland Theological Institute, and also studied for a master's degree in theology from Trinity College Dublin. In August 2017 he was ordained a deacon in the Church of Ireland Diocese of Cashel and Ossory. He was ordained priest in Christchurch Cathedral, Waterford city on 8 September 2018.

== Media ==
Sargent has made many appearances on the Irish-language TV channel TG4. He was a guest judge on TG4's Feirm Factor and a guest gardener for Season 2 of Garrai Glas in 2011. He also made an appearance on The Podge and Rodge Show on 10 April 2006.

== Personal life ==
Sargent lived in Balbriggan for 30 years. In 1987 he helped found Sonairte, The National Ecology Centre, in Laytown, County Meath and served as chairman. He has been active in GIY Ireland. In 1998, he married Heidi Bedell, a former local councilor, and one-time coordinator of the Green Party; they divorced in 2013. Sargent lived with his second wife, Aine Neville, in Tacumshin, County Wexford, where they developed an organic horticulture enterprise. They were also members of the Wexford Naturalists' field club.

Party political offices
New post	Leader of the Irish Green Party; 2001–2007	Succeeded by John Gormley

Dáil	Election	Deputy (Party)	Deputy (Party)	Deputy (Party)	Deputy (Party)	Deputy (Party)	Deputy (Party)	Deputy (Party)	Deputy (Party)
4th	1923	Alfie Byrne (Ind.)	Francis Cahill (CnaG)	Margaret Collins-O'Driscoll (CnaG)	Seán McGarry (CnaG)	William Hewat (BP)	Richard Mulcahy (CnaG)	Seán T. O'Kelly (Rep)	Ernie O'Malley (Rep)
4th	1925 by-election	Alfie Byrne (Ind.)	Patrick Leonard (CnaG)	Margaret Collins-O'Driscoll (CnaG)	Oscar Traynor (Rep)	William Hewat (BP)	Richard Mulcahy (CnaG)	Seán T. O'Kelly (Rep)	Ernie O'Malley (Rep)
5th	1927 (Jun)	Alfie Byrne (Ind.)	John Byrne (CnaG)	Margaret Collins-O'Driscoll (CnaG)	Oscar Traynor (SF)	Denis Cullen (Lab)	Richard Mulcahy (CnaG)	Seán T. O'Kelly (FF)	Kathleen Clarke (FF)
6th	1927 (Sep)	Alfie Byrne (Ind.)	John Byrne (CnaG)	Margaret Collins-O'Driscoll (CnaG)	Patrick Leonard (CnaG)	James Larkin (IWL)	Richard Mulcahy (CnaG)	Seán T. O'Kelly (FF)	Eamonn Cooney (FF)
6th	1928 by-election	Alfie Byrne (Ind.)	John Byrne (CnaG)	Margaret Collins-O'Driscoll (CnaG)	Patrick Leonard (CnaG)	Vincent Rice (CnaG)	Richard Mulcahy (CnaG)	Seán T. O'Kelly (FF)	Eamonn Cooney (FF)
6th	1929 by-election	Thomas F. O'Higgins (CnaG)	John Byrne (CnaG)	Margaret Collins-O'Driscoll (CnaG)	Patrick Leonard (CnaG)	Vincent Rice (CnaG)	Richard Mulcahy (CnaG)	Seán T. O'Kelly (FF)	Eamonn Cooney (FF)
7th	1932	Alfie Byrne (Ind.)	John Byrne (CnaG)	Margaret Collins-O'Driscoll (CnaG)	Oscar Traynor (FF)	Cormac Breathnach (FF)	Richard Mulcahy (CnaG)	Seán T. O'Kelly (FF)	Eamonn Cooney (FF)
8th	1933	Alfie Byrne (Ind.)	Patrick Belton (CnaG)	Vincent Rice (CnaG)	Oscar Traynor (FF)	Cormac Breathnach (FF)	Richard Mulcahy (CnaG)	Seán T. O'Kelly (FF)	Eamonn Cooney (FF)
9th	1937	Constituency abolished. See Dublin North-East and Dublin North-West							

Dáil	Election	Deputy (Party)	Deputy (Party)	Deputy (Party)	Deputy (Party)
22nd	1981	Ray Burke (FF)	John Boland (FG)	Nora Owen (FG)	3 seats 1981–1992
23rd	1982 (Feb)	Ray Burke (FF)	John Boland (FG)	Nora Owen (FG)	3 seats 1981–1992
24th	1982 (Nov)	Ray Burke (FF)	John Boland (FG)	Nora Owen (FG)	3 seats 1981–1992
25th	1987	Ray Burke (FF)	John Boland (FG)	G. V. Wright (FF)	3 seats 1981–1992
26th	1989	Ray Burke (FF)	Nora Owen (FG)	Seán Ryan (Lab)	3 seats 1981–1992
27th	1992	Ray Burke (FF)	Nora Owen (FG)	Seán Ryan (Lab)	Trevor Sargent (GP)
28th	1997	Ray Burke (FF)	Nora Owen (FG)	G. V. Wright (FF)	Trevor Sargent (GP)
28th	1998 by-election	Seán Ryan (Lab)	Nora Owen (FG)	G. V. Wright (FF)	Trevor Sargent (GP)
29th	2002	Seán Ryan (Lab)	Jim Glennon (FF)	G. V. Wright (FF)	Trevor Sargent (GP)
30th	2007	James Reilly (FG)	Michael Kennedy (FF)	Darragh O'Brien (FF)	Trevor Sargent (GP)
31st	2011	James Reilly (FG)	Alan Farrell (FG)	Brendan Ryan (Lab)	Clare Daly (SP)
32nd	2016	Constituency abolished. See Dublin Fingal			
