= Young Progressive Democrats =

- Founded: 1 September 2002
- Dissolved: 15 September 2009
- Headquarters: 25 South Frederick Street, Dublin 2
- Ideology: Classical liberalism Conservative liberalism Economic liberalism
- European affiliation: European Liberal Youth
- International affiliation: International Federation of Liberal Youth
- Colours: Green, dark blue

The Young Progressive Democrats were the youth wing of the Irish political party, the Progressive Democrats. Weakened after the party's poor showing in the 1997 elections, they were completely reformed on a national basis after the 2002 general election. A special conference of the Young Progressive Democrats (YPD) was held in party headquarters on 18 October 2008. This was in response to the announcement of the Parliamentary Party interest in winding up the Progressive Democrats Party. At this special conference the Young Progressive Democrats agreed to formally dissolve the Young Progressive Democrats following the same timetable as the Progressive Democrats for dissolving. A November 2008 special congress of the Progressive Democrats resolved that the party should come to an end; it was officially dissolved on 20 November 2009. By this action the Young Progressive Democrats also ceased to exist.

== Branches ==
They had branches in Trinity College Dublin, Dublin Institute of Technology, University College Dublin, Cork Institute of Technology and University College Cork. They also had a regional organisation in Dublin, Cork, Galway and the Mid West (Tipperary/Limerick/Clare) composed of young people who were not in college as well as the students from the Dublin, Cork, Galway and Limerick colleges.

They also had members from NUI Maynooth, NUI Galway, Dublin City University, University of Limerick, Waterford IT, Mary Immaculate College, Griffith College Dublin and National College of Ireland.

== Media coverage ==
The Young Progressive Democrats earned coverage in the national media in the past. In 2003 they received media attention after the Minister for Justice, Michael McDowell, was allegedly almost assaulted by protesters while trying to address the UCD branch of the Young Progressive Democrats.

The following September, a satirical leaflet produced by the Young Progressive Democrats that compared all of the political parties to pizzas was covered in the Sunday Independent.

In November 2004 a debate organised by the Trinity College Dublin Young Progressive Democrats between the Minister for Justice, Michael McDowell, and the General Secretary of Sinn Féin, Robbie Smyth, received front-page coverage on the Sunday Independent and was also covered in the Irish Examiner.

In September 2005 the Young Progressive Democrats received huge media coverage for a leaflet which compared politics to Star Wars. They received front-page coverage on the Irish Independent and the Sunday Tribune as well as coverage from the Irish Sun, the Irish Mirror, the Sunday Times, the Observer, 98FM and several other radio stations.

In November 2005, comments made by the Tánaiste Mary Harney at a Trinity College Dublin Young Progressive Democrat event made the front page of the Sunday Tribune. They quoted her as saying that she had no preference as to whether she was in government with Fianna Fáil or Fine Gael.

In March 2006 a Young Progressive Democrat workshop on the future of the Irish language received broad coverage throughout the Irish-language media.

They have also received mixed coverage from the political satire magazine The Phoenix. Two articles were printed highlighting bitter fights between the Dublin and Cork regions of the youth party. A "young blood" profile was published of the then Chairperson Diane Duggan. In April 2006, The Phoenix published an article detailing how the Young Progressive Democrats had successfully launched a campaign to prevent Ógra Fianna Fáil becoming members of the European Liberal Youth.

== Electoral Success ==
Several members of the Young Progressive Democrats have run for election in both local elections and general elections. These include Jason O'Mahoney, Noelle Ryan, Bob Quinn, Paul McAuliffe, Ben Howe and Barry Saul.

Barry Saul was the first YPD member to serve as a public representative when he was co-opted to Dún Laoghaire–Rathdown County Council in 2003. Alan McGaughey (YPD Chairperson 2002) was subsequently co-opted onto South Dublin County Council in January 2008.

In the 2009 local elections Barry Saul (now FG) and Paul McAuliffe (now FF) were elected, respectively to Dún Laoghaire–Rathdown County Council and Dublin City Council respectively.

== International links ==
The Young Progressive Democrats was a member of two international youth organisations:

- The International Federation of Liberal Youth (IFLRY), which acts as the youth organisation of Liberal International.
- The European Liberal Youth (LYMEC), which acts as the youth organisation of the European Liberal Democrat and Reform Party.
