= Niamh Brennan =

Irish academic

- Born: Niamh Máire Brennan; 1954 (age 71–72)
- Education: University College Dublin
- Occupation: Academic
- Employer: University College Dublin
- Spouse: Michael McDowell (politician)
- Children: 3

Niamh Máire Brennan (born 1954) is the Michael MacCormac Professor of Management at University College Dublin (UCD), Ireland.

== Background ==
Brennan was born in December 1954. She obtained a Bachelor of Science in microbiology and biochemistry from UCD in 1976, graduating first in her class. She then worked for accounting firm Stokes Kennedy Crowley (now KPMG) from 1976 to 1980, becoming a chartered accountant and a Fellow of Chartered Accountants Ireland (FCA) in 1979. Brennan earned a PhD from the University of Warwick in 1995. She became a Chartered Director (CDir) at the Institute of Directors in 2007.

== Career ==
Brennan has been the UCD Michael MacCormac Professor of Management since 1999 and the Founder and Academic Director of the UCD Centre for Corporate Governance since 2002. She has held visiting academic positions at the University of Sydney, University of South Australia, University of Canterbury, University of Otago, Queensland University of Technology, Rotman School of Management, Swinburne University of Technology, RMIT University, and Auckland University of Technology.

Brennan is the former chairperson of the National College of Art and Design and the Dublin Docklands Development Authority. She has also served as a director for Children's Health Ireland, the Health Service Executive (HSE), Ulster Bank, Co-operation Ireland, Coillte and a number of private companies. She is chairperson of the audit and risk committee of the Garda Síochána.

== Awards and honours ==
In 2018, Brennan received the British Accounting and Finance Association Distinguished Academic Award. She is an honorary fellow of the Institute of Directors in Ireland and of the Society of Actuaries in Ireland. In 2020, Brennan was elected to the Royal Irish Academy.

== Personal life ==
Brennan is married to politician and barrister Michael McDowell since 1987. They have 3 children.
