= Mary Harney =

Irish politician (born 1953)

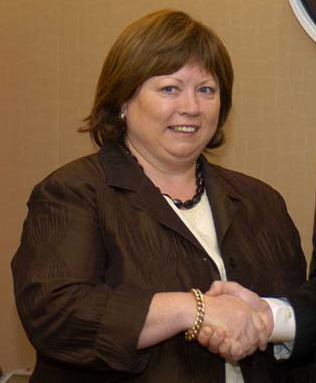
- Harney in 2007

Minister for Health and Children
- In office 29 September 2004 – 19 January 2011
- Taoiseach: Bertie Ahern; Brian Cowen
- Preceded by: Micheál Martin
- Succeeded by: Mary Coughlan

Minister for Enterprise, Trade and Employment
- In office 26 June 1997 – 13 September 2004
- Taoiseach: Bertie Ahern
- Preceded by: Richard Bruton
- Succeeded by: Micheál Martin

Tánaiste
- In office 26 June 1997 – 13 September 2006
- Taoiseach: Bertie Ahern
- Preceded by: Dick Spring
- Succeeded by: Michael McDowell

Leader of the Progressive Democrats
- In office 25 May 2007 – 17 April 2008
- Preceded by: Michael McDowell
- Succeeded by: Ciarán Cannon
- In office 26 October 1993 – 11 September 2006
- Preceded by: Desmond O'Malley
- Succeeded by: Michael McDowell

Minister of State
- 1989–1992: Environment

Teachta Dála
- In office May 2002 – February 2011
- Constituency: Dublin Mid-West
- In office June 1981 – May 2002
- Constituency: Dublin South-West

Senator
- In office 27 October 1977 – 11 June 1981
- Constituency: Nominated by the Taoiseach

President of the College Historical Society
- Incumbent
- Assumed office March 2024
- Preceded by: David McConnell

Personal details
- Born: 11 March 1953 (age 73) Ballinasloe, County Galway, Ireland
- Party: Independent (since 2009)
- Other political affiliations: Progressive Democrats (1985–2009); Fianna Fáil (1977–1985)
- Spouse: Brian Geoghegan (m. 2001)
- Education: Trinity College Dublin

Mary Harney (born 11 March 1953) is an Irish former politician and the former Chancellor of the University of Limerick.

She was leader of the Progressive Democrats party between 1993 and 2006 and again from 2007 to 2008, resuming the role after her successor, Michael McDowell, lost his seat at the 2007 general election. She is the second longest-ever-serving female member of Dáil Éireann, serving as a Teachta Dála (TD) successively for the Dublin South-West and Dublin Mid-West constituencies from 1981 to 2011.

She was Ireland's first female Tánaiste from 1997 to 2006, and the first woman to lead a party in Dáil Éireann.

== Early life and education ==
Harney was born in Portiuncula Hospital, Ballinasloe, County Galway, in 1953. Her parents, who lived in nearby Ahascragh, were both farmers, but shortly after her birth her family moved to Newcastle, County Dublin. She was educated at the Convent of Mercy, Inchicore, and Presentation Convent, Clondalkin, before studying at Trinity College Dublin.

During her time in Trinity, she became the first female auditor (chair) of the College Historical Society. In 1976, she graduated with a Bachelor of Arts in Economic and Social Studies, and for a brief time was a secondary school teacher at Castleknock College in Dublin.

== Political career: 1977–2011 ==
=== Fianna Fáil: 1977–1985 ===
Harney came to the attention of Fianna Fáil leader Jack Lynch, and stood unsuccessfully as a Fianna Fáil candidate in the 1977 general election. She was then appointed to Seanad Éireann by Lynch who had become Taoiseach. She was the youngest ever member of the Seanad when appointed, aged 24.

In 1979, Harney had her first electoral success when she was elected to Dublin County Council. Two years later she was elected to the Dáil at the 1981 general election for Dublin South-West. She retained her seat at every election until her retirement in 2011, moving to the new Dublin Mid-West constituency at the 2002 general election when it was created from part of Dublin South-West.

After the killers of gay man Declan Flynn received suspended sentences, Harney challenged then Minister for Justice Michael Noonan to seek the resignation of the judge.

As a member of the so-called Gang of 22, she was expelled from the party after voting in favour of the Anglo-Irish Agreement in 1985.

=== Foundation of Progressive Democrats: 1985–1997 ===
Harney went on to become a founder member of the Progressive Democrats with Desmond O'Malley and Bobby Molloy in December 1985.

Following the 1989 general election the Progressive Democrats entered into a coalition government with Fianna Fáil, led at the time by Charles Haughey. Harney was appointed Minister of State with responsibility for Environmental Protection. As Minister of State she championed legislation to ban the sale of bituminous coal in Dublin, thereby eliminating smog from the city. She served in this position until the party withdrew from government in late 1992. In February 1993, Harney was appointed deputy leader of the Progressive Democrats, and succeeded O'Malley as party leader in October of that year, making her the first female leader of an Irish political party in Dáil Eireann.

=== Return to coalition with Fianna Fáil: 1997–2004 ===
Following the 1997 general election and lengthy negotiations, the Progressive Democrats entered into coalition government with Fianna Fáil. Harney was appointed the first female Tánaiste and first female Minister for Enterprise, Trade and Employment. Harney used her powers to initiate thirteen investigations into companies which tribunals had suggested might have breached company law. After the 2002 general election Harney led the Progressive Democrats, who had doubled their seats from four to eight, back into coalition with Fianna Fáil, the first time a government had been re-elected since 1969. She was re-appointed Tánaiste and Minister for Enterprise, Trade and Employment. She inaugurated the Personal Injuries Assessment Board (PIAB) in May 2004, to reduce high litigation costs in personal injuries cases and to compensate claimants quickly and cheaply. This was a major reform of the insurance market long opposed by the legal profession.

Harney was Ireland's representative to the European Council of Ministers for the Software Patents Directive. Because the council's first reading fell during the Irish Presidency of the European Council, she was chair of the meeting that discarded the amendments by the European Parliament which confirmed the exclusion of software innovations from what constitutes patentable subject matter.

In December 2001, Harney controversially used an Air Corps aircraft to travel to County Leitrim to open a friend's off-licence in Manorhamilton; the trip cost €1,500. Harney later apologised for having abused her position in using the plane for non-government business, and admitted that using the plane was wrong. The aircraft was to be used 90% of the time exclusively for maritime surveillance.

=== Minister for Health and Children: 2004–2011 ===
In a government reshuffle on 29 September 2004, Harney was appointed Minister for Health and Children.

In May 2006, the Irish Nurses Organisation unanimously passed a motion of no confidence in Mary Harney, accusing her of being negative and antagonistic towards nurses. Her policy of transferring private beds in public hospitals to privately operated hospitals also attracted criticism.

In March 2006, 16 months after she took office as health minister, the INO claimed that a record number of 455 people were waiting on hospital trolleys on one day (although the Health Service Executive gave a figure of 363 people waiting on hospital trolleys for the same day). In June 2006 the Health Consumer Powerhouse ranked the Irish health service as the second-least-"consumer-friendly" in the European Union and Switzerland, coming 25th out of 26 countries, ahead of only Lithuania. However, when the same survey was conducted a year later, the Irish health service showed significant improvement, coming 16th out of 29 countries, even scoring higher than Britain's NHS, which came 17th in the survey.

In July 2006, Ireland on Sunday reported that Mary Harney's mother, Sarah Harney, jumped a queue of two emergency cases to receive hip surgery at The Adelaide and Meath Hospital in Tallaght. The allegation was strongly denied by the minister. Sixty percent of respondents to a The Irish Times/TNS mrbi poll in December 2006 said that the appointment of Harney to the position of Minister for Health had not led to any improvement in the health service. Fine Gael, the Labour Party and Harney's own Progressive Democrats supporters were those who expressed most satisfaction, with people in Dublin also feeling most dissatisfaction regionally. Harney rejected criticisms from Fine Gael during the same month that there had been a 25% increase in people waiting on trolleys in regional hospitals during the past two years; she claimed Health Service Executive statistics showed otherwise.

In July and August 2006, she issued three orders exempting two new community nursing units, to be built at St. Mary's Hospital in the Phoenix Park, from the usual legal requirement of planning permission, despite the Park being a designated and protected national monument. The Department of Health said the decision was made because of what it called the department's "emergency response to the accident and emergency crisis at the time", although the nursing units, in use since 2008, are mainly for geriatric care.

The same year, in her capacity as Minister for Health, Mary Harney introduced risk equalisation into the Irish healthcare market. This was hugely resisted by BUPA. Despite High Court proceedings, the controversial change was upheld. This forced BUPA out of the Irish healthcare market. (BUPA Ireland was afterwards bought by the Irish-owned Quinn Group, averting any fear of redundancies.) In January 2007 a leaked memo said that the planned Cancer Care Strategy, due for completion in 2011, would not be delivered on time. Harney denied this and said that since the leaking of the memo there had been much progress, although she did not elaborate. The plan was to allow for nationwide radiotherapy services by 2011.

=== Resignation and return as party leader: 2006–2008 ===
On 7 September 2006, Mary Harney announced that she was resigning as leader of the Progressive Democrats and that she would remain leader until a successor was chosen. She said she wanted to continue as Minister for Health but stated that it was a matter for her successor and the Taoiseach. She was succeeded by then-Justice Minister Michael McDowell after Tom Parlon and backbencher Liz O'Donnell nominated him. Parlon became party president and O'Donnell Deputy Leader in an agreement with McDowell after much speculation that the pair would also seek the leadership.

Following the poor performance of the Progressive Democrats at the 2007 general election, in which the party lost six of its eight seats including that of party leader Michael McDowell, Harney resumed her role as party leader. The Progressive Democrats' rules at the time stipulated that the leader of the party must be a TD, and Harney was one of only two remaining TDs; she resumed the leadership in a caretaker capacity. Following a rule change that broadened the eligibility, she was succeeded by Senator Ciarán Cannon as party leader on 17 April 2008.

=== Independent TD: 2008–2011 ===
When the Progressive Democrats voted to disband in November 2008, Harney said she would remain as an independent TD once the party was wound up.

=== Resignation as minister and retirement from Dáil: 2011 ===
On 15 January 2011, Harney tendered her resignation as Minister for Health and Children to Taoiseach Brian Cowen. She also stated that she would not be contesting the 2011 general election.

=== Electoral results ===
Elections to the Dáil
Party	Election		FPv	FPv%	Result
Fianna Fáil	Dublin South-East	1977	1,588	5.9	Eliminated on count 4/7
Fianna Fáil	Dublin South-West	1981	4,192	11.6	Elected on count 7/7
Fianna Fáil	Dublin South-West	February 1982	5,830	16.3	Elected on count 4/5
Fianna Fáil	Dublin South-West	November 1982	4,619	12.3	Elected on count 9/9
Progressive Democrats	Dublin South-West	1987	8,169	19.7	Elected on count 8/13
Progressive Democrats	Dublin South-West	1989	4,323	11.1	Elected on count 7/7
Progressive Democrats	Dublin South-West	1992	4,964	11.6	Elected on count 13/13
Progressive Democrats	Dublin South-West	1997	4,713	11.3	Elected on count 7/7
Progressive Democrats	Dublin Mid-West	2002	5,706	20.0	Elected on count 9/10
Progressive Democrats	Dublin Mid-West	2007	4,663	12.5	Elected on count 6/6

== Criticisms ==
Alongside her predecessor at the Department of Health, Micheál Martin, and officials at two prominent Dublin fertility clinics, she received a package which included a threatening letter on 29 February 2008.

Councillor Louise Minihan, a member of Dublin City Council, threw red paint over Harney on 1 November 2010 as Harney turned the sod on a new health centre beside the Cherry Orchard Hospital in Ballyfermot. Minihan was detained but later released.

On 12 November 2010, Harney's ministerial car was pelted with eggs and cheese as she arrived in Nenagh, with protesters referring to the "ongoing downgrading of the [local] hospital".

=== FÁS expenses scandal ===
In 2004 she travelled to Florida with senior FÁS executives, department officials, and her husband, Brian Geoghegan, and was receiving more than €100-a-day subsistence money from the taxpayer when FÁS picked up her hairdressing bill in a Florida hotel. Like all government ministers travelling abroad, she was entitled to a daily allowance for "incidental expenses".

In a RTÉ Radio 1 interview on 27 November 2008, Fianna Fáil TD Mary O'Rourke described Harney's involvement in the scandal as "a load of hoo-hah".

On 28 November 2008, Harney defended her use of expenses while on a FÁS trip to the US, saying that she was "not on holiday", she had not used public taxes for her own personal grooming, that the use of the government jet for the trip was made by the Taoiseach, and she had followed advice in claiming her expenses. She acknowledged meeting a relative for an hour while in the United States. Labour Party leader Eamon Gilmore told his party conference that Harney should resign because of her performance as Minister for Health.

=== Libel cases ===
In 2002, Harney settled a libel case with Magill magazine for around €25,000, and in 2004 she settled a case against the Sunday Independent for €70,000. In May 2011, she received a €450,000 in compensation from Newstalk radio for a slur made about her on live air by journalist Nell McCafferty.

== Post-politics ==
=== Board memberships ===
In 2012, Harney joined the board of a new healthcare company, Cara. In her first interview since leaving office, Harney said she joined the boards of two Irish 'high-potential' start-ups, Cara Health and Ward Biotech. She was also employed in speaking engagements, saying: "I spoke at a recent surgeons' conference in New York on my experience as a health minister and in Berlin on the Irish pharma sector." In April 2012 Harney joined the board of car fleet insurer Euro Insurances, an Irish subsidiary of Dutch leasing giant Leaseplan. Indian pharma businessman Kiran Mazumdar-Shaw, appointed Harney to the board of Biocon, a Bangalore-based company employing 7,000 and expanding in Malaysia.

=== 2016 address ===
On 17 April 2016, Harney intervened in government formation talks, claiming the deadlock would damage "Ireland's reputation" in remarks made during her closing address at the three-day Women in Media conference in Ballybunion. In the same address Harney, who attended with husband Brian Geogheghan, claimed that "when she left public life she made a conscious decision to leave politics behind her".

== Recognition ==
In 2019, Trinity College Dublin awarded Harney an honorary doctorate.

== Personal life ==
In November 2001 Harney married Brian Geoghegan, a businessman, in a low-key afternoon ceremony in Dublin, on a day in which she attended to a number of significant political meetings, including one with the Taoiseach and the Minister for Finance.

Political offices
New office	Minister of State at the Department of the Environment; 1989–1992	Succeeded by John Browne
Preceded by Richard Bruton	Minister for Enterprise, Trade and Employment; 1997–2004	Succeeded by Micheál Martin
Preceded by Dick Spring	Tánaiste; 1997–2006	Succeeded by Michael McDowell
Preceded by Micheál Martin	Minister for Health and Children; 2004–2011	Succeeded by Mary Coughlan
Party political offices
Preceded by Desmond O'Malley	Leader of the Progressive Democrats; 1993–2006	Succeeded by Michael McDowell
Preceded by Michael McDowell	Leader of the Progressive Democrats; 2007–2008	Succeeded by Ciarán Cannon

Dáil	Election	Deputy (Party)	Deputy (Party)	Deputy (Party)	Deputy (Party)	Deputy (Party)
13th	1948	Seán MacBride (CnaP)	Peadar Doyle (FG)	Bernard Butler (FF)	Michael O'Higgins (FG)	Robert Briscoe (FF)
14th	1951	Seán MacBride (CnaP)	Peadar Doyle (FG)	Bernard Butler (FF)	Michael ffrench-O'Carroll (Ind.)	Robert Briscoe (FF)
15th	1954	Seán MacBride (CnaP)	Peadar Doyle (FG)	Bernard Butler (FF)	Michael O'Higgins (FG)	Robert Briscoe (FF)
15th	1956 by-election	Seán MacBride (CnaP)	Noel Lemass (FF)	Bernard Butler (FF)	Michael O'Higgins (FG)	Robert Briscoe (FF)
16th	1957	James Carroll (Ind.)	Noel Lemass (FF)	Bernard Butler (FF)	Michael O'Higgins (FG)	Robert Briscoe (FF)
16th	1959 by-election	James Carroll (Ind.)	Noel Lemass (FF)	Richie Ryan (FG)	Michael O'Higgins (FG)	Robert Briscoe (FF)
17th	1961	James Carroll (Ind.)	Noel Lemass (FF)	Richie Ryan (FG)	James O'Keeffe (FG)	Robert Briscoe (FF)
18th	1965	John O'Connell (Lab)	Noel Lemass (FF)	Richie Ryan (FG)	Joseph Dowling (FF)	Ben Briscoe (FF)
19th	1969	John O'Connell (Lab)	Noel Lemass (FF)	Seán Dunne (Lab)	Joseph Dowling (FF)	4 seats 1969–1977
19th	1970 by-election	John O'Connell (Lab)	Noel Lemass (FF)	Seán Sherwin (FF)	Joseph Dowling (FF)	4 seats 1969–1977
20th	1973	John O'Connell (Lab)	Noel Lemass (FF)	Declan Costello (FG)	Joseph Dowling (FF)	4 seats 1969–1977
20th	1976 by-election	John O'Connell (Lab)	Brendan Halligan (Lab)	Declan Costello (FG)	Joseph Dowling (FF)	4 seats 1969–1977
21st	1977	Constituency abolished. See Dublin Ballyfermot				

Dáil	Election	Deputy (Party)	Deputy (Party)	Deputy (Party)	Deputy (Party)	Deputy (Party)
22nd	1981	Seán Walsh (FF)	Larry McMahon (FG)	Mary Harney (FF)	Mervyn Taylor (Lab)	4 seats 1981–1992
23rd	1982 (Feb)	Seán Walsh (FF)	Larry McMahon (FG)	Mary Harney (FF)	Mervyn Taylor (Lab)	4 seats 1981–1992
24th	1982 (Nov)	Seán Walsh (FF)	Michael O'Leary (FG)	Mary Harney (FF)	Mervyn Taylor (Lab)	4 seats 1981–1992
25th	1987	Seán Walsh (FF)	Chris Flood (FF)	Mary Harney (PDs)	Mervyn Taylor (Lab)	4 seats 1981–1992
26th	1989	Pat Rabbitte (WP)	Chris Flood (FF)	Mary Harney (PDs)	Mervyn Taylor (Lab)	4 seats 1981–1992
27th	1992	Pat Rabbitte (DL)	Chris Flood (FF)	Mary Harney (PDs)	Mervyn Taylor (Lab)	Éamonn Walsh (Lab)
28th	1997	Pat Rabbitte (DL)	Chris Flood (FF)	Mary Harney (PDs)	Conor Lenihan (FF)	Brian Hayes (FG)
29th	2002	Pat Rabbitte (Lab)	Charlie O'Connor (FF)	Seán Crowe (SF)	Conor Lenihan (FF)	4 seats 2002–2016
30th	2007	Pat Rabbitte (Lab)	Charlie O'Connor (FF)	Brian Hayes (FG)	Conor Lenihan (FF)	4 seats 2002–2016
31st	2011	Pat Rabbitte (Lab)	Eamonn Maloney (Lab)	Brian Hayes (FG)	Seán Crowe (SF)	4 seats 2002–2016
31st	2014 by-election	Pat Rabbitte (Lab)	Eamonn Maloney (Lab)	Paul Murphy (AAA)	Seán Crowe (SF)	4 seats 2002–2016
32nd	2016	Colm Brophy (FG)	John Lahart (FF)	Paul Murphy (AAA–PBP)	Seán Crowe (SF)	Katherine Zappone (Ind.)
33rd	2020	Colm Brophy (FG)	John Lahart (FF)	Paul Murphy (S–PBP)	Seán Crowe (SF)	Francis Noel Duffy (GP)
34th	2024	Colm Brophy (FG)	John Lahart (FF)	Paul Murphy (PBP–S)	Seán Crowe (SF)	Ciarán Ahern (Lab)

Dáil	Election	Deputy (Party)	Deputy (Party)	Deputy (Party)	Deputy (Party)	Deputy (Party)
29th	2002	Paul Gogarty (GP)	3 seats 2002–2007	Mary Harney (PDs)	John Curran (FF)	4 seats 2002–2024
30th	2007	Paul Gogarty (GP)	Joanna Tuffy (Lab)	Mary Harney (PDs)	John Curran (FF)	4 seats 2002–2024
31st	2011	Robert Dowds (Lab)	Joanna Tuffy (Lab)	Frances Fitzgerald (FG)	Derek Keating (FG)	4 seats 2002–2024
32nd	2016	Gino Kenny (AAA–PBP)	Eoin Ó Broin (SF)	Frances Fitzgerald (FG)	John Curran (FF)	4 seats 2002–2024
32nd	2019 by-election	Gino Kenny (AAA–PBP)	Eoin Ó Broin (SF)	Mark Ward (SF)	John Curran (FF)	4 seats 2002–2024
33rd	2020	Gino Kenny (S–PBP)	Eoin Ó Broin (SF)	Mark Ward (SF)	Emer Higgins (FG)	4 seats 2002–2024
34th	2024	Paul Gogarty (Ind.)	Eoin Ó Broin (SF)	Mark Ward (SF)	Emer Higgins (FG)	Shane Moynihan (FF)
