= Fathers Rights-Responsibility Party =

Defunct Irish political party

Fathers' Rights-Responsibility Party
- Leader: Liam Ó Gógáin
- Founded: February 2007
- Dissolved: 2010
- Ideology: Pro-fathers' rights, masculism

Fathers' Rights-Responsibility Party was an Irish political party, led by Liam Ó Gógáin and formed in 2007. It was not registered with the clerk of Dáil Éireann and thus, when it contested the 2007 general election, its 8 candidates ran as independents. They polled 1,355 first preference votes in total in that election and did not win any seats. The party campaigned on fathers' rights issues in Ireland, arguing that there were "injustices against fathers within the courts system".
