= Progressive Democrats =

Irish political party (1985–2009)

Progressive Democrats An Páirtí Daonlathach
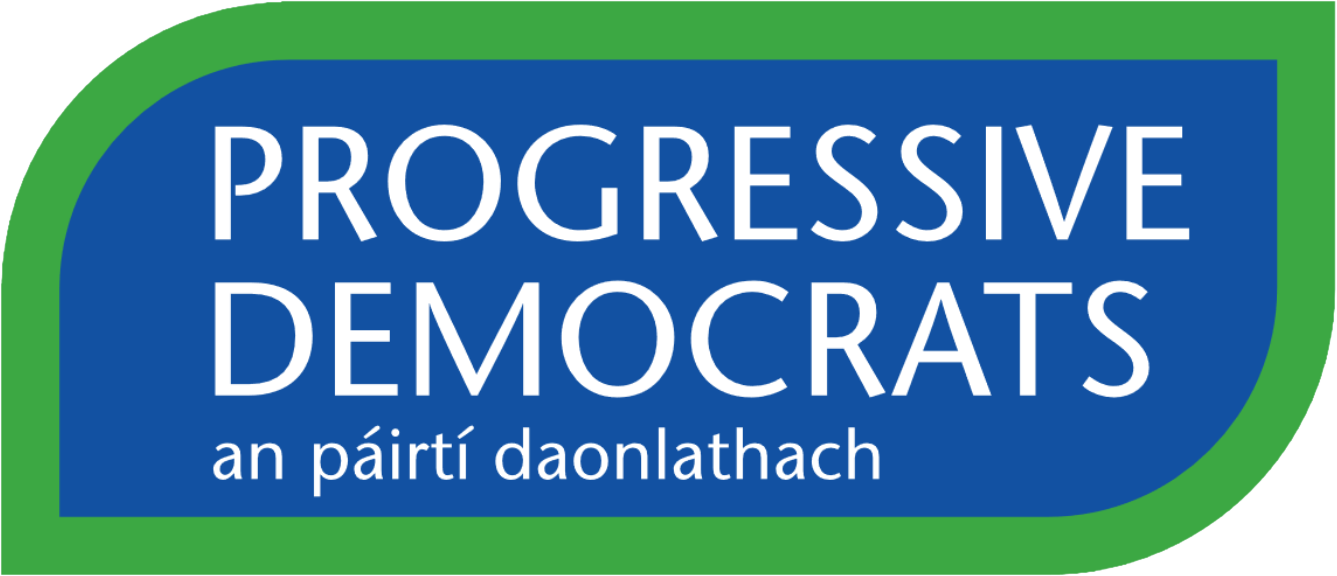
- Leader: Desmond O'Malley (first); Noel Grealish (last)
- Founder: Desmond O'Malley
- Founded: 21 December 1985
- Dissolved: 20 November 2009
- Headquarters: 25 South Frederick Street, Dublin 2
- Youth wing: Young Progressive Democrats
- Ideology: Conservative liberalism Economic liberalism
- Political position: Centre-right
- European affiliation: European Liberal Democrat and Reform Party
- European Parliament group: LDR (1989–1994)
- International affiliation: Liberal International
- Colours: Green, dark blue

Website
- http://www.progressivedemocrats.ie/

The Progressive Democrats (Irish: An Páirtí Daonlathach, literally "The Democratic Party"), commonly referred to as the PDs, were a conservative liberal political party in Ireland. The party's history spanned 24 years, from its formation in 1985 to its dissolution in 2009.

Launched on 21 December 1985 by Desmond O'Malley and other politicians who had split from Fianna Fáil and Fine Gael, the Progressive Democrats took liberal positions on divorce, contraception and other social issues. The party also supported economic liberalisation, advocating measures such as lower taxation, fiscal conservatism, privatisation and welfare reform. The party performed strongly at its first election, the 1987 general election, winning 14 seats in Dáil Éireann and capturing almost 12 per cent of the popular vote to temporarily surpass the Labour Party as Ireland's third-largest political party.

Although the Progressive Democrats never again won more than 10 seats in the Dáil, it formed coalition governments with Fianna Fáil during the 26th Dáil (1989–1992), the 28th Dáil (1997–2002), the 29th Dáil (2002–2007) and the 30th Dail (2007–2009). These successive years as the government's junior coalition partner gave the party an influence on Irish politics and economics disproportionate to its small size. The party was credited with shaping the low-tax, pro-business environment that contributed to Ireland's Celtic Tiger economic boom during the 1990s and 2000s; however, it was also blamed for contributing to the post-2008 Irish financial and economic crisis.

Mary Harney became party leader in 1993, the first woman to lead any major Irish political party. She stepped down in 2006 and was succeeded by Michael McDowell, who led the party into the 2007 general election, where it lost six of its eight seats in the Dáil. The party never recovered from this electoral collapse. On 8 November 2008, delegates to a special conference in Mullingar voted to disband the party, which was formally dissolved on 20 November 2009. The two Progressive Democrats elected to the 30th Dáil, Harney and Noel Grealish, continued to support the government as independent TDs. Harney continued to serve as Minister for Health and Children until January 2011.

== History ==
=== Foundation ===
The party was founded in 1985 by Desmond O'Malley, a former senior minister in Fianna Fáil governments under Jack Lynch and Charles Haughey. O'Malley was a strong opponent of Haughey and was involved in a number of leadership heaves against Haughey, who was popular and controversial in equal measure. O'Malley had lost the Fianna Fáil whip in the Dáil in 1984 because of his support for the New Ireland Forum report and was finally expelled from Fianna Fáil early in 1985 for "conduct unbecoming" a member when he refused to support Fianna Fáil's opposition to the introduction of contraception.

At the party's launch in December 1985, O'Malley was joined by Mary Harney, who had lost the Fianna Fáil parliamentary whip, and by former Fine Gael activist Michael McDowell. In the weeks after its launch, Fianna Fáil TDs Bobby Molloy and Pearse Wyse, and Fine Gael TD Michael Keating also joined the party. The defectors were dissatisfied with the policies of existing parties, which they viewed as being insufficiently liberal, both economically and on social issues such as divorce and contraception. In Ireland in 1985, when personal income above £7,300 per annum was taxed at 60 percent, the country's national debt was 104 percent of GDP, unemployment was 17.3 percent, the Progressive Democrats' liberal reformist agenda was considered especially radical.

McDowell suggested a number of names for the party, including New Democrats, New Republic, National Party, Radical Party; Progressive Democrats was not among his suggestions. O'Malley declared that the party ought to be pro-enterprise, in favour of economic participation by all, liberal and pluralist, hostile to institutional dependency, favourable to incentives, pro self-reliance, deregulating where possible, anti-monopoly and pro-competition, low-key on nationalism, stressing "real republican" values rather than "nationalistic myths".

=== Electoral breakthrough and coalition ===
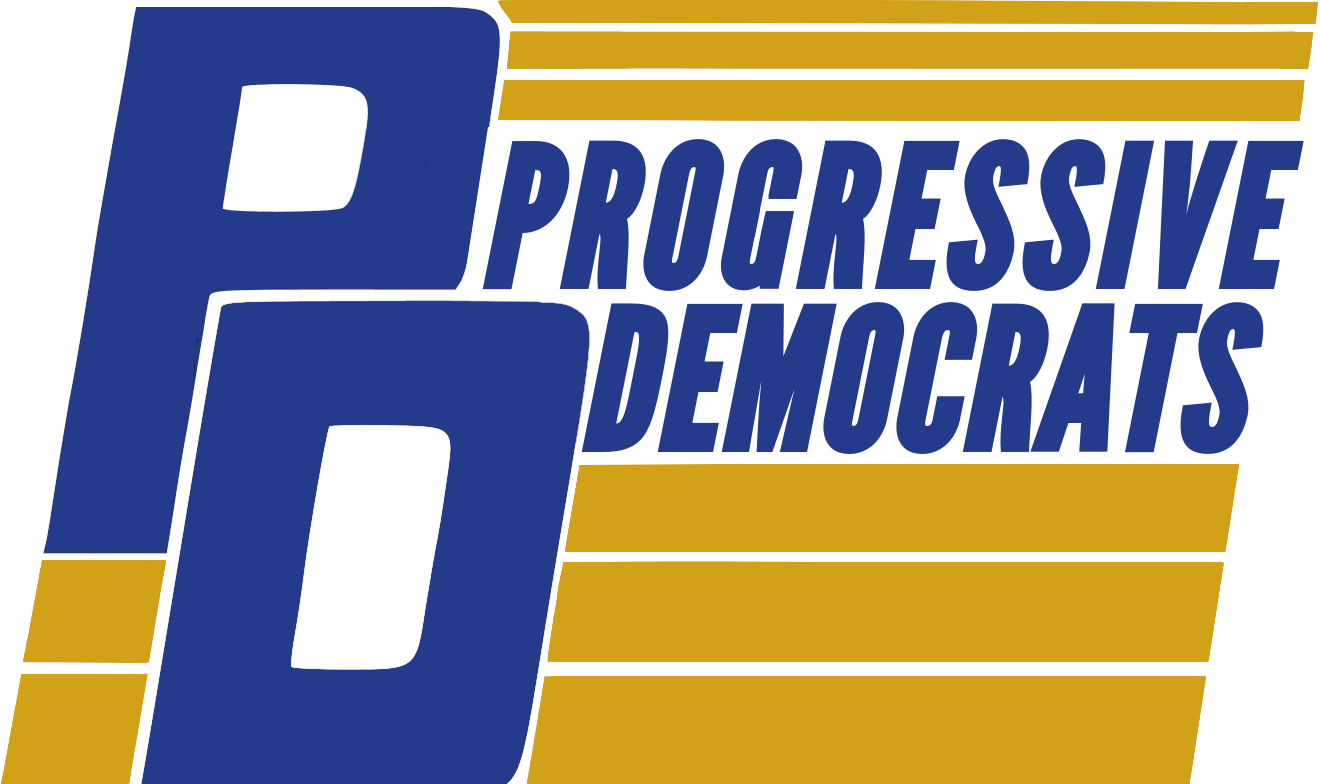
The first logo of the party, used during the 1980s

At the 1987 general election the new party won 14 seats and 11.9% of the vote, becoming the third-largest party in the 25th Dáil. The Progressive Democrats formed the second-largest opposition party under difficult circumstances. The minority Fianna Fáil government introduced some of the economic reforms that the Progressive Democrats had recommended. Fianna Fáil was however largely supported by Fine Gael where the economy was concerned, and so the Progressive Democrats had difficulty being effective in opposition.

After the 1989 general election, the party had only six seats but formed a coalition government with Fianna Fáil, with Charles Haughey as Taoiseach, which was the first time Fianna Fáil entered coalition. PD leader Desmond O'Malley served as Minister for Industry and Commerce.

In 1990, a scandal broke surrounding Tánaiste (deputy prime minister) Brian Lenihan Snr's role in pressuring President Patrick Hillery not to allow then-Taoiseach Garret FitzGerald to dissolve the Dáil in 1982. The Progressive Democrats gave Haughey an ultimatum—unless Lenihan was removed from cabinet, they would pull out of the coalition and support a no-confidence motion in the government. Haughey tried to force Lenihan to resign, and sacked him when he refused. A year later, after former Justice Minister Seán Doherty claimed that Haughey had authorised tapping journalists' phones in the 1980s, the PDs told Haughey that they would tear up the coalition agreement if he remained as Taoiseach. With O'Malley's approval, Haughey stood down as Taoiseach in February 1992. He was replaced by Albert Reynolds, and O'Malley retained his cabinet post.

=== Harney leadership ===
After the collapse of Reynolds' first administration later in 1992, O'Malley retired from the leadership of the party. Following the 1992 general election, John Dardis (Agricultural Panel) and Cathy Honan (Industrial and Commercial Panel) were elected to Seanad Éireann as part of an election pact with their politically polar opposites Democratic Left. Mary Harney became the new leader after a bitter electoral contest with Pat Cox who later left the party. Harney was the first woman to lead any of the major Irish political parties. (Note: Margaret Buckley had led Sinn Féin between 1936 and 1950, but during a period where they held no seats in the Dáil and didn't contest elections.) Harney served as Tánaiste (deputy prime minister) from May 1997 until September 2006 after a return to government in coalition with Fianna Fáil.

In the 2002 general election the party doubled its Dáil seats to eight, although its share of the vote declined slightly to 4%. In total, the Progressive Democrats participated in coalition governments four times, on each occasion with Fianna Fáil (1989–1992; 1997–2002; 2002–2007; 2007–2009), and also with the Green Party from 2007 to 2009.

In 2005 Michael McDowell publicly took a firmly anti-republican position and named Gerry Adams, Martin McGuinness and Martin Ferris as members of the IRA Army Council. The convention in Irish politics at this time was not to accuse Sinn Féin politicians of being members of the Army Council, in doing so McDowell broke with convention. He said that until the IRA disbanded Sinn Féin could not be involved in government, North or South.

=== McDowell leadership and demise ===
On 7 September 2006, Mary Harney announced that she was stepping down as leader of the Progressive Democrats. She expressed a wish to stay on as Minister for Health. On 10 September, Michael McDowell was elected unopposed as Party Leader, having been nominated by Tom Parlon and that nomination being seconded by Liz O'Donnell. Liz O'Donnell became Deputy Leader and Tom Parlon became Party President.

The 2007 general election was a disastrous one for the party. The Progressive Democrats lost six of their eight seats in the 166-seat Dáil. Among those to lose their seats were party leader Michael McDowell, deputy leader Liz O'Donnell and party president Tom Parlon. McDowell retired from public life after he lost his seat, and Mary Harney was asked by the party chairperson to resume the role of party leader. The following month, Tom Parlon announced that he was also leaving public life and would take up the position of Director General of the Irish Construction Industry Federation.

A committee headed by former Senator John Dardis recommended in September 2007 that the role of leader be taken on by a senator or councillor (although the party rules then required that the position must be held by a TD). A meeting of the party's General Council on 16 February 2008 changed the rules to allow any senator, councillor or any party member with the support of 20 other members to stand for the party's leadership and on 17 April, Senator Ciarán Cannon was elected leader, defeating fellow Senator Fiona O'Malley.

The party's two remaining TDs, Mary Harney and Noel Grealish, entered into coalition government with Fianna Fáil and the Green Party in the 30th Dáil. The party never recovered from this electoral collapse. On 8 November 2008, with all parliamentary members (two TDs and two Senators) and founder Desmond O'Malley united in the opinion that the party was no longer politically viable, delegates to a special conference in Mullingar voted by 201 votes to 161 to bring the Progressive Democrats to an end. In January 2009 the party was still operating and in receipt of state funding, including a Party Leader's Allowance paid to Minister Mary Harney, but had ceased to receive funding by the following June. In March 2009, Noel Grealish became caretaker leader after Cannon's decision to join Fine Gael, and he retained the role for the remaining months of the party's existence.

The archives of the Progressive Democrats party were presented to University College Dublin on 10 June 2009. At least 20 former Progressive Democrats councillors won seats on county, city and town councils at the 2009 local elections. Some were elected as Fine Gael candidates, some as Fianna Fáil and others as independents.

=== Later events ===
At the 2011 general election 11 former Progressive Democrats members stood as candidates for the Dáil in a country-wide spread of constituencies. Three former PD members were elected: Mary Mitchell O'Connor (PD Councillor 2004–2008) was elected in Dún Laoghaire for Fine Gael, Ciarán Cannon (PD Senator 2007–2009 / party leader 2008–2009) was elected in Galway East for the same party, while Noel Grealish (PD TD 2002–2009 / caretaker party leader 2009) was re-elected as an independent TD for Galway West. Several ex-PD members stood for election to Seanad Éireann in 2011. Cáit Keane was elected as a Fine Gael senator; she had served on South Dublin County Council for the PDs between 1991 and 2008, and had stood for election in the Dublin South-Central constituency for the PDs in 1992, 1994 and 1997.

As of 2024, Noel Grealish remains in the Dáil, having been re-elected as an independent in 2011, 2016, 2020 and 2024.

Michael McDowell was elected to the Seanad in 2016, 2020 and 2025 as an independent representing the National University of Ireland panel.

== Ideology and policies ==
The Progressive Democrats were described as conservative liberals, liberal, and classical liberal.

The party's economic policies were based on neoliberalism. They supported the freedom of private enterprise and the lowering of taxes. They generally favoured privatisation; for example, they supported the privatisation of the previously state-owned airline Aer Lingus and communications company Telecom Éireann. They were also part of the break-up of airports company Aer Rianta and unsuccessfully lobbied for a private, competing second terminal in Dublin Airport. As acting PD leader and Minister for Health, Mary Harney was involved in the controversial extension of private-sector influence in health care. She pursued a policy of co-location of private hospitals on public hospital grounds and is seen as sympathetic to the privatisation of health insurance. However, they opposed their coalition partner's plans to privatise airports company Aer Rianta on the grounds that a private monopoly would be worse than a public monopoly.

The party was a strong supporter of low taxation. As the Economic and Social Research Institute (ESRI) stated in 2002: "On balance, budgets over the past 10 to 20 years have been more favourable to high income groups than low income groups, but particularly so during periods of high growth". While the party was in government since 1997, the lower rate of income tax fell from 26% to 20% and the upper rate from 48% to 41%.

They supported low corporation tax because they believe it encouraged business growth and enabled private enterprise to be rewarded. The party often claimed these policies were in part responsible for the "Celtic Tiger" economy. Dermot McAleese, emeritus professor of economics at Trinity College Dublin, says that the emergence of the Progressive Democrats in 1985 may have had a more positive influence on the economy than some recognise. He argues the Irish low-tax, pro-business economy is based in large part on Progressive Democrat policies. "They proved that there was a constituency for this, and they gave the intellectual power to it."

The party leaders rejected the idea that they are ruled by ideology alone. Former party leader Michael McDowell has said that he sees liberalism as not being on the left-right spectrum as it is a mix of the ideals of both. Mary Harney, on becoming health minister said "I don't get my politics from any ideology, I get it from my experience and common sense". Yet Harney was a controversial minister who attempted to extend private influence in the health service and McDowell's campaign in the general election included particularly strong attacks on Irish left-wing parties.

Despite having in its ranks the openly gay Colm O'Gorman, the Progressive Democrats did not support same-sex marriage. Instead, they claimed to propose legislating for civil union; however attempts by the Labour Party to legislate for civil unions in the previous Dáil had been forestalled by PD Minister for Justice, Equality and Law Reform Michael McDowell, due to his insistence that non-sex relationships be recognised too. The Progressive Democrats again voted down the same bill in the 29th Dáil.

Both Progressive Democrats and other commentators have suggested that the party had a greater influence on government policy since 1997 than might be expected from its size. This belief appears to have some basis – as of September 2004 the party controlled two of the most important cabinet positions (Justice and Health), despite having less than one-tenth of the seats of its coalition partner Fianna Fáil.

In a 2000 speech to the American Bar Association, the party leader Mary Harney appeared to express a desire that Ireland become "closer to Boston than Berlin", adopting US free-market models for economic development, health, education, and other services rather than European Continental models because she believed that while continental countries (such as Germany and France) have more equality, they had bad economies and high unemployment.

However, in the midst of the ongoing Irish financial crisis, many opponents began to question the legacy of the Progressive Democrats. In a review of the Department of Finance Robert Wright, a Canadian economist, singled out the policies of the PDs and Fianna Fáil's 2002 election manifestos as contributing significantly to the 2008 property market crash.

== Leadership history ==
=== Leader ===
Name	Portrait	Period	Constituency
Desmond O'Malley		1985–1993	Limerick East
Mary Harney		1993–2006	Dublin South-West; Dublin Mid-West
Michael McDowell		2006–2007	Dublin South-East
Mary Harney		2007–2008	Dublin Mid-West
Ciarán Cannon		2008–2009	Senator nominated by the Taoiseach
Noel Grealish		2009	Galway West

=== Deputy leader ===
- Michael Keating (1986–1989)
- Pearse Wyse (1989–1992)
- Pat Cox (1992–1994)
- Liz O'Donnell (2006–2007)
- Noel Grealish (2007–2009)

=== President ===
- Michael McDowell (2002–2006)
- Tom Parlon (2006–2007)

== Election results ==
=== General election results ===
Election	Leaders	FPv	%	Seats	%	±	Dáil	Government
1987	Desmond O'Malley	210,583	11.8 (#3)	14 / 166	8.4 (#3)	New	25th	Opposition; 20th government (FF minority)
1989	Desmond O'Malley	91,013	5.5 (#4)	6 / 166	3.6 (#5)	▼8	26th	Government; 21st government (FF-PD majority)
1992	Desmond O'Malley	80,787	4.7 (#4)	10 / 166	6.0 (#4)	▲4	27th	Opposition; 23rd government (FF-Lab majority)
1992	Desmond O'Malley	80,787	4.7 (#4)	10 / 166	6.0 (#4)	▲4	27th	Opposition; 24th government (FG-Lab-DL majority)
1997	Mary Harney	83,765	4.7 (#4)	4 / 166	3.6 (#5)	▼6	28th	Government; 25th government (FF-PD minority)
2002	Mary Harney	73,628	4.0 (#5)	8 / 166	4.8 (#4)	▲4	29th	Government; 26th government (FF-PD majority)
2007	Michael McDowell	56,396	2.7 (#6)	2 / 166	1.2 (#6)	▼6	30th	Government; 27th, 28th government (FF-GP-PD/Ind majority)

=== Presidential Elections ===
Election	Nominee	Party	Alliance	1st	Final
1990	—N/a				
1997	Mary McAleese	FF	Fianna Fáil	45.2%	55.6%
2004	Mary McAleese	IND	List: Fianna Fáil; Fine Gael; Green; Labour; Sinn Féin	Unopposed	

=== Local government election results ===
Election	Leader	First pref. vote	Vote %	Seats
1991	Desmond O'Malley	70,926	5.0%	37 / 883
1994	Mary Harney	8,077	3.24%	18 / 744
1999	Mary Harney	41,362	2.9%	25 / 883
2004	Mary Harney	69,650	3.8%	33 / 1,627

== See also ==
- Category:Progressive Democrats politicians
- Young Progressive Democrats
