= 2007 Irish general election =

Election to the 30th Dáil

- 24 May 2007

166 seats in Dáil Éireann (Note: Including Rory O'Hanlon (FF), returned automatically for Cavan–Monaghan as outgoing Ceann Comhairle, under Art. 16.6 of the Constitution and the Electoral Act 1992.) 84 seats needed for a majority
- Turnout: 67.0% ▲4.4 pp
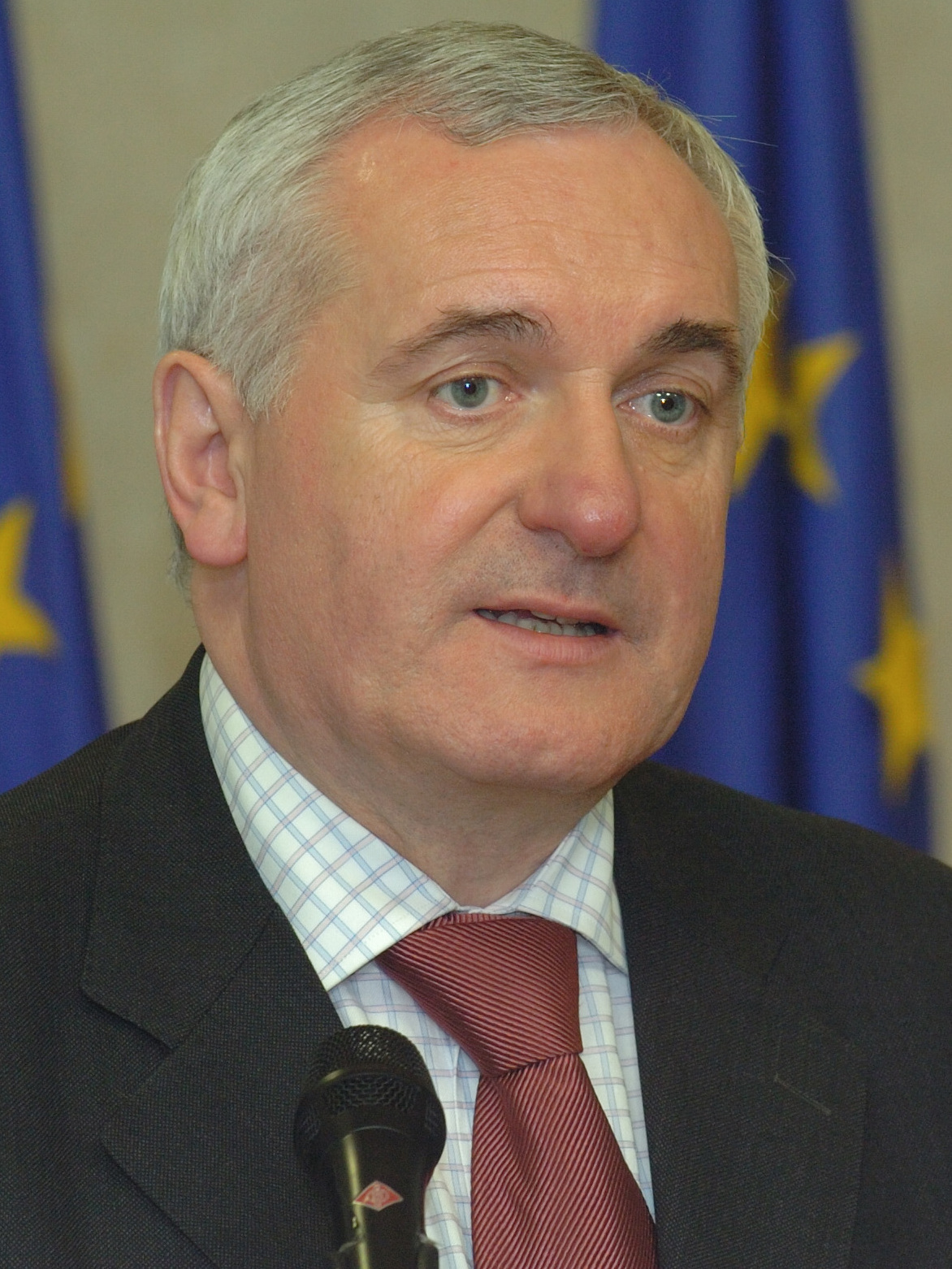

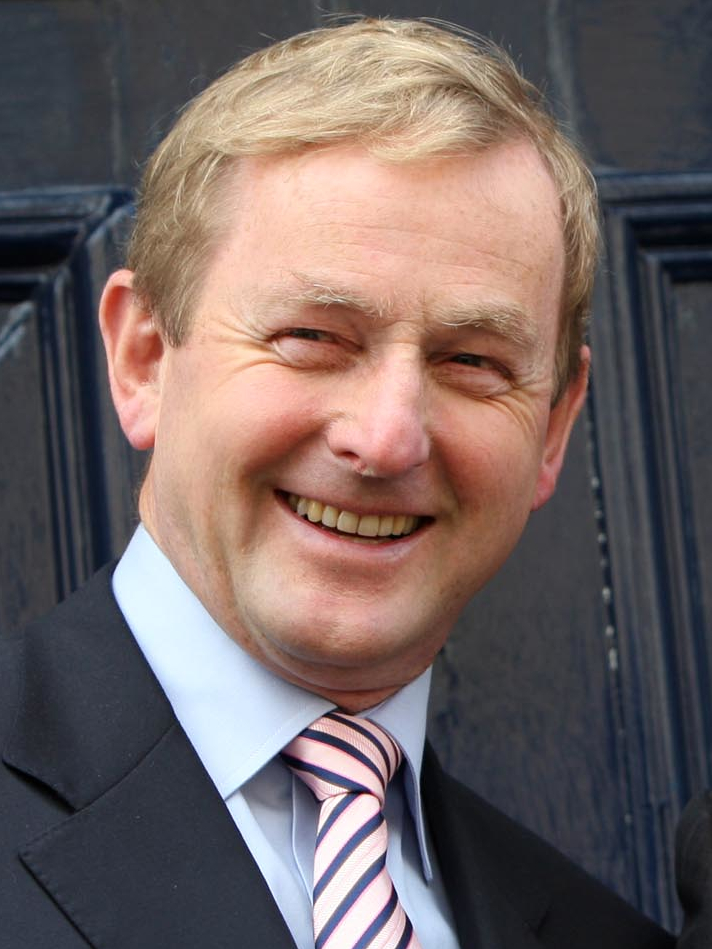

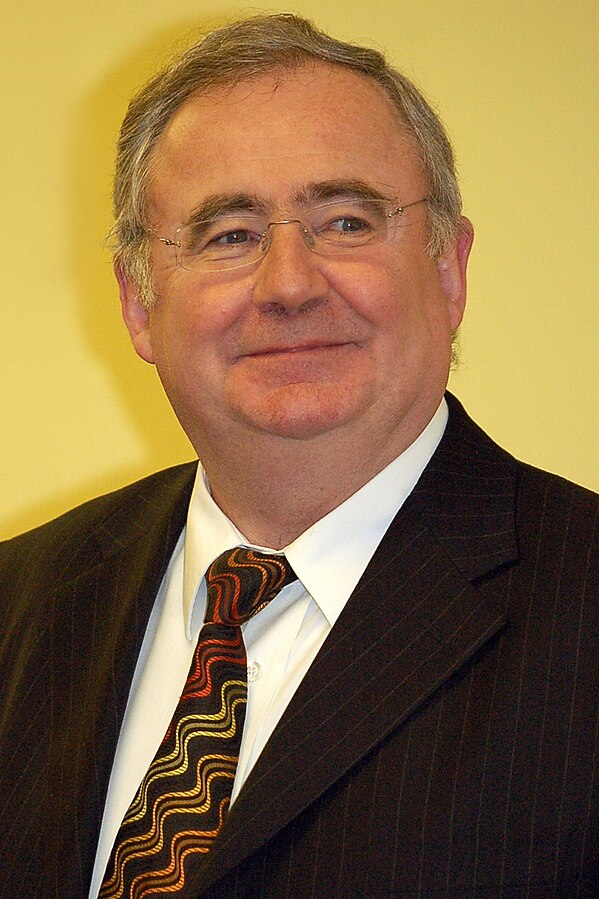

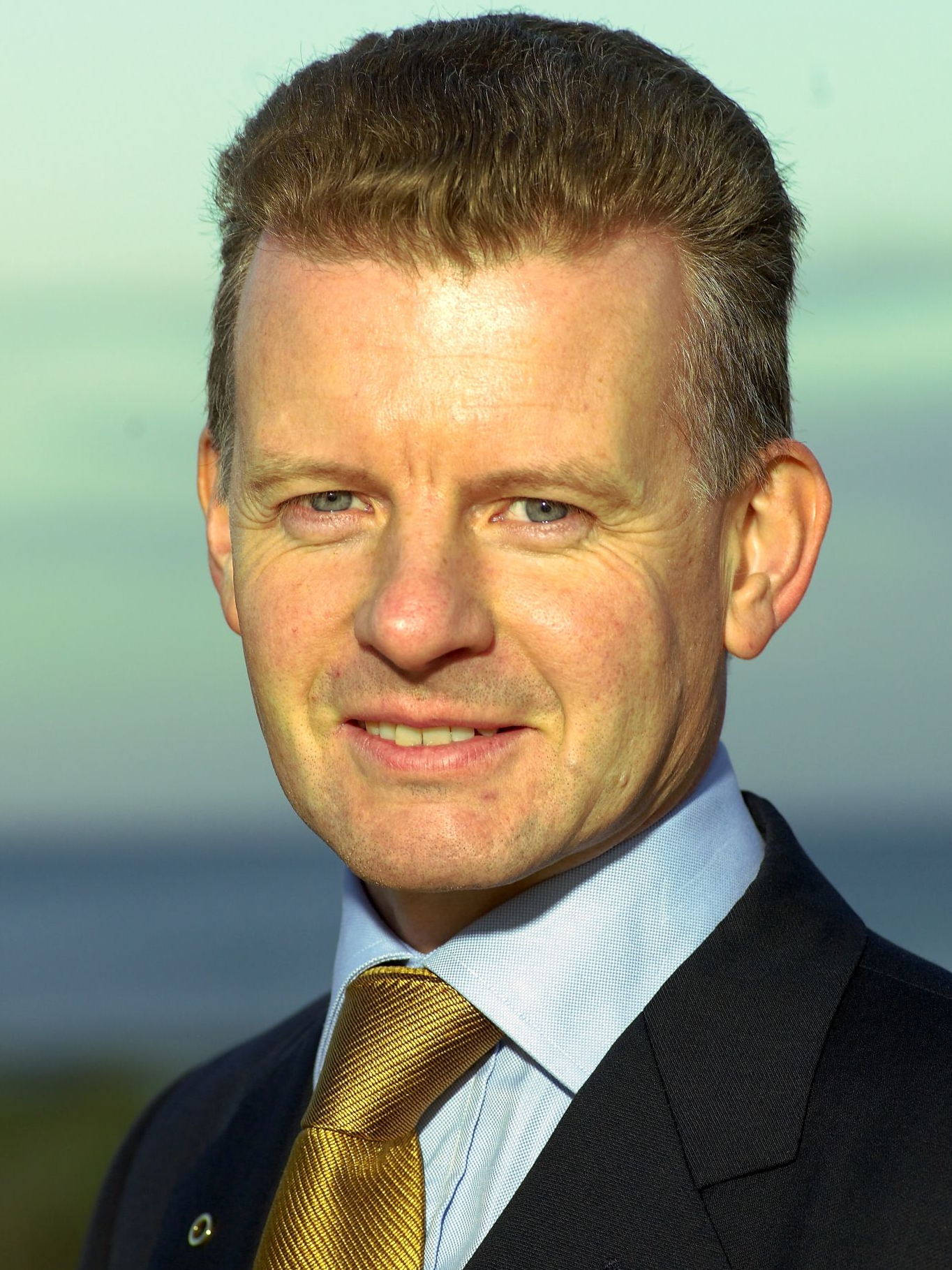

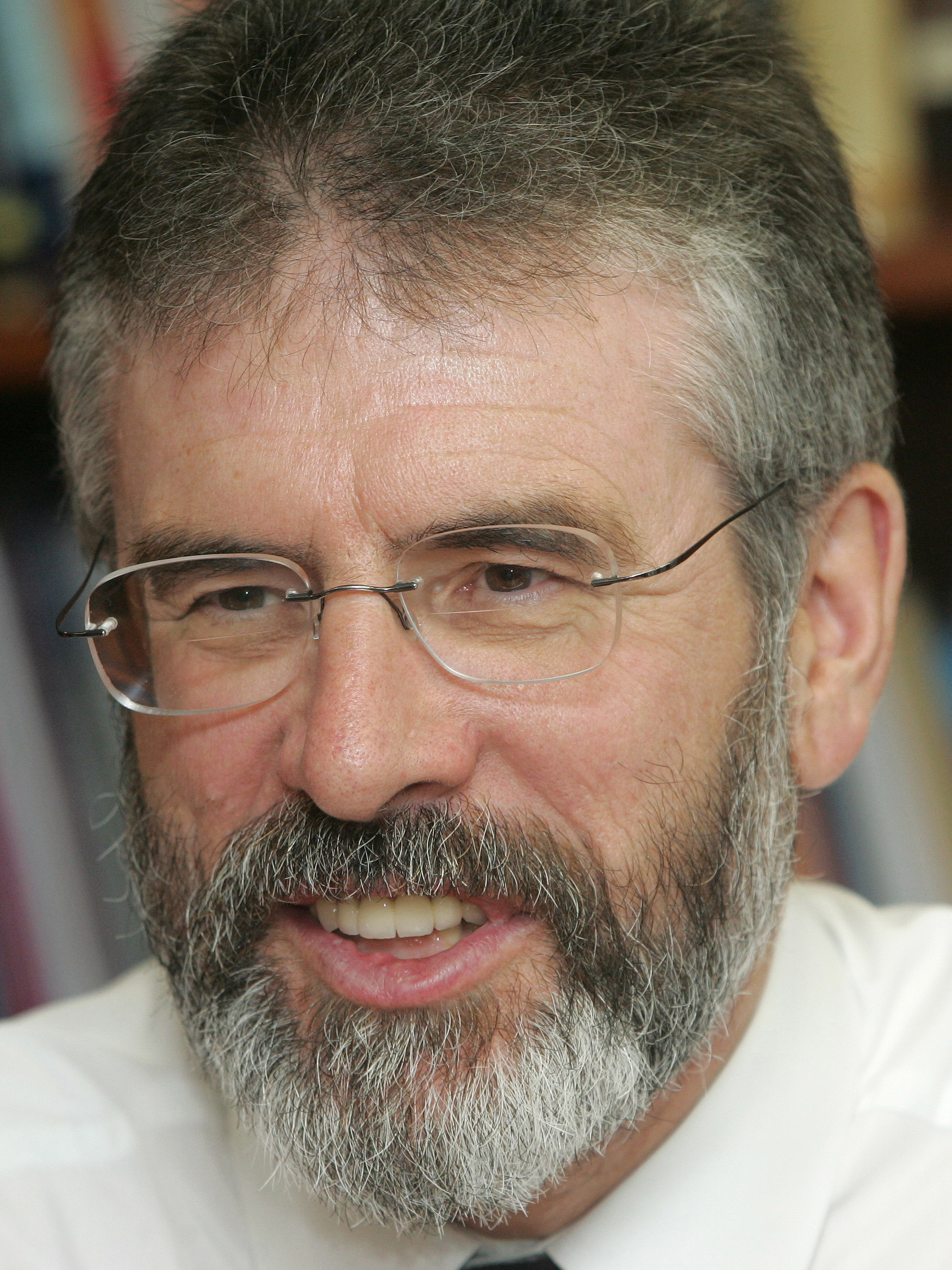

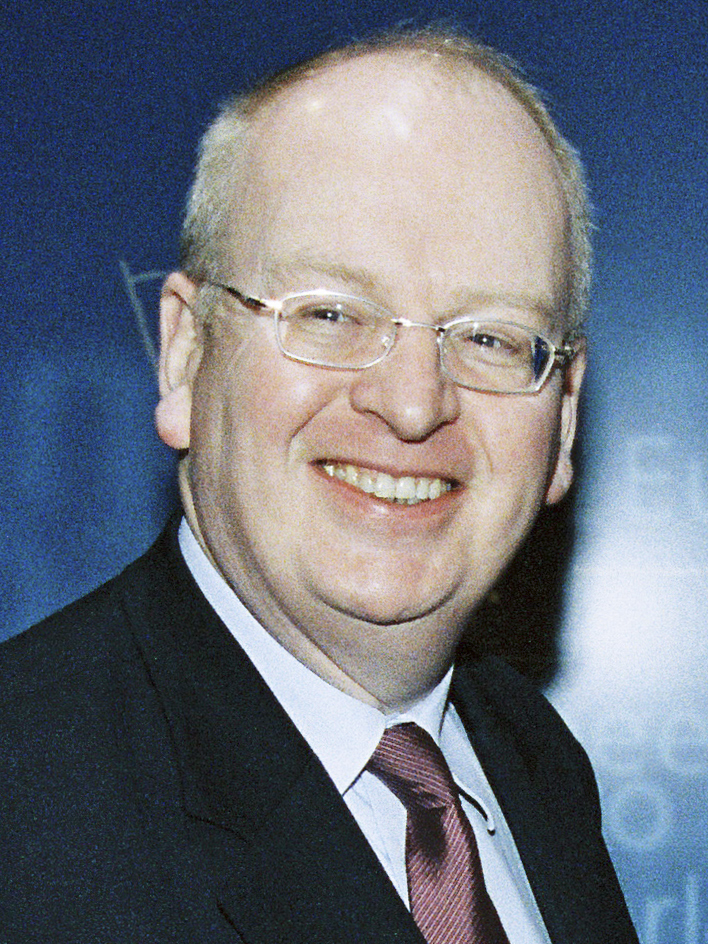
	First party	Second party	Third party
Leader	Bertie Ahern	Enda Kenny	Pat Rabbitte
Party	Fianna Fáil	Fine Gael	Labour
Leader since	19 December 1994	2 June 2002	25 October 2002
Leader's seat	Dublin Central	Mayo	Dublin South-West
Last election	81 seats, 41.5%	31 seats, 22.5%	20 seats, 10.8%
Seats won	78	51	20
Seat change	▼3	▲20	0
Popular vote	858,565	564,428	209,175
Percentage	41.6%	27.3%	10.1%
Swing	▲0.1 pp	▲4.8 pp	▼0.7 pp
	Fourth party	Fifth party	Sixth party
Leader	Trevor Sargent	Gerry Adams	Michael McDowell
Party	Green	Sinn Féin	Progressive Democrats
Leader since	6 October 2001	13 November 1983	11 September 2006
Leader's seat	Dublin North	N/A (Note: Adams sat as the abstentionist MP for Belfast West in the UK Parliament; Caoimhghín Ó Caoláin (TD for Cavan–Monaghan) was leader of the party in the Dáil.)	Dublin South-East (defeated)
Last election	6 seats, 3.8%	5 seats, 6.5%	8 seats, 4.0%
Seats won	6	4	2
Seat change	0	▼1	▼6
Popular vote	96,936	143,410	56,396
Percentage	4.7%	6.9%	2.7%
Swing	▲0.9 pp	▲0.4 pp	▼1.3 pp
Taoiseach before election
Bertie Ahern
Fianna Fáil
Taoiseach after election
Bertie Ahern
Fianna Fáil

The 2007 Irish general election took place on Thursday, 24 May after the dissolution of the 29th Dáil by the President on 30 April, at the request of the Taoiseach. The general election took place in 43 parliamentary constituencies throughout Ireland for 166 seats in Dáil Éireann, the lower house of parliament, with a revision of constituencies since the last election under the Electoral (Amendment) Act 2005. The outgoing Fianna Fáil–Progressive Democrat administration was returned, joined by the Green Party and supported by some independents, giving a government majority of 9.

While Fine Gael gained 20 seats, Fianna Fáil remained the largest party. The election was considered a success for Fianna Fáil; however, Fianna Fáil's junior coalition partners in the 29th Dáil, the Progressive Democrats, lost six of their eight seats.

The 30th Dáil met on 14 June to nominate a Taoiseach and ratify the ministers of the new 27th government of Ireland. It was a coalition government of Fianna Fáil, the Green Party and the Progressive Democrats initially supported by four Independent TDs. It was the first time the Green Party entered government.

== Election date and system ==
On 30 April 2007, President Mary McAleese dissolved the 29th Dáil on the request of the Taoiseach, Bertie Ahern. The election date was officially set as 24 May 2007; the 30th Dáil would convene on 14 June 2007 at which stage the Taoiseach would be nominated and the rest of the Government approved for appointment by the President. Official campaigning began as soon as the announcement had been made.

Current statute requires that the Dáil be dissolved within five years after its first meeting (6 June 2002) following the previous election and the election must take place not later than thirty days after the dissolution. (Note: Article 16.5 of the Constitution of Ireland states that the Dáil may sit for a period of up to seven years from its first meeting. It also allows a shorter period to be fixed by law; this is currently fixed at five years.) The Taoiseach allowed the 29th Dáil to near the completion of its five-year term before seeking a dissolution. After the 2002 general election he commented that his prior confirmation of this policy had caused problems in the last year of his government. There was speculation in 2005 that he might have moved to dissolve parliament early to catch the opposition off guard, although this did not transpire.

In 2005, in anticipation of the election date, the parties began candidate selections and from mid-2005 some members of the 29th Dáil announced their retirement plans.

A statement by Minister of State for Children Brian Lenihan in November 2006 suggested that the election would take place in May 2007, which would be the case. In December 2006, Bertie Ahern stated unambiguously that the election would take place in summer 2007.

There was some controversy over which day of the week the election should have been held on, as some opposition parties insisted that a weekend polling day would have made it easier for those studying or working away from home to vote. Ireland's voter registration process presents difficulties for people who live at a second address for part of the week. Previous elections and referendums have been held on Thursdays, Fridays and (in one case) a Wednesday. For the 2007 election, polling day was a Thursday.

The Taoiseach denied that the election was called on Sunday 29 April 2007 to prevent the Mahon Tribunal recommencing investigations the following day concerning alleged payments to politicians (including Ahern). Because of the election campaign, the Mahon Tribunal suspended its public hearings on Monday 30 April 2007, and resumed them four days after the general election on 28 May 2007.

The closing time and date for nominations was 12:00 Irish Summer Time on Wednesday 9 May 2007.

Polls were open from 07:30 until 22:30 IST. The system of voting was proportional representation by means of the single transferable vote (PR-STV). The general election took place in 43 parliamentary constituencies throughout Ireland for 165 of the 166 Dáil Éireann seats (the Ceann Comhairle is automatically re-elected). (Note: Article 16.6 of the constitution requires that "provision shall be made by law" such that the Ceann Comhairle "be deemed without any actual election to be elected a member of Dáil Éireann". The current law making such provision is the Electoral Act 1992.)

== Campaign ==
Election posters in Dublin South-East during the campaign

As a result of falling opinion poll ratings for the outgoing government in the months approaching the start of the campaign, the election was one of the more closely fought in decades, with the outcome being very uncertain.

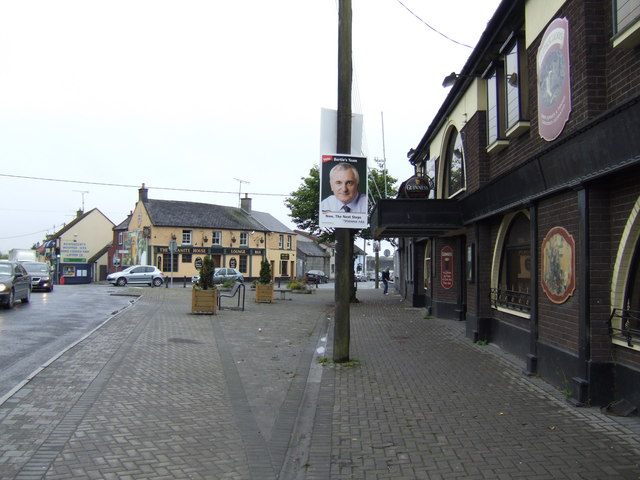
Poster in Castledermot featuring Ahern and urging a vote for "Bertie's Team."

This election was fought as a contest for Taoiseach between the outgoing Fianna Fáil–Progressive Democrats coalition and the "Alliance for Change", a proposed Fine Gael–Labour Party coalition. Opinion polls did not show either option as being certain, and other possibilities included a Fianna Fáil–led coalition with other parties, or Fine Gael and the Labour Party with the Green Party. Fine Gael and the Labour Party had an agreed transfer pact. The Green Party was non-aligned but made statements favouring a change from the outgoing Government. All parties, with the exception of the Green Party, claimed that they would not include Sinn Féin in a new Government.

Due to the run-up of the Dáil to the maximum allowable life-span, it was clear to all parties that the election would be held early summer 2007 and all parties held "conferences" during the spring to announce policies. At this time Fine Gael launched a "Contract for a Better Ireland" which was a centrepiece of their campaign. The early conferences led to the campaign being described as one of the longest in recent times. The campaign officially began at the dissolution of the Dáil. This dissolution was done early on a Sunday morning, and there was much speculation about the reason for this during the first week of the campaign. The leaking and publication, just before the election was called, of evidence about personal finance transactions in December 1994 given to the Mahon Tribunal by the Taoiseach Bertie Ahern led to the first two weeks of the campaign being dominated by questions about his fitness to serve as Taoiseach, and required the Progressive Democrats to decide if they would pull out of Government before the election was held, but they decided to remain. The Tribunal itself decided to postpone sittings during the campaign.

Following a statement by the Taoiseach, the remainder of the campaign concentrated on the traditional issues of health, education, crime and the economy, with debate centring on the ability of the various parties to deliver on the various totals of hospital beds, Gardaí and pupil-teacher ratios they were promising. Prime Time hosted a debate among the potential candidates for Tánaiste and a separate debate between Ahern and Enda Kenny, coverage of which concentrated on Kenny's ability to serve as Taoiseach given his lack of experience. Finance minister Brian Cowen engaged in some robust exchanges towards the end of the campaign which was reported to have been an asset to the party.

Opinion polls during the early stages of the campaign showed the Alliance for Change gaining on the Government and the likelihood of Kenny becoming Taoiseach increased, with some commentators predicting that Fianna Fáil would return with only 65 seats. In the last week of the campaign, following the leaders debate, an Irish Times/MRBI poll showed a recovery for Fianna Fáil to 41% which was replicated on polling day.

== Constituency changes ==
See Electoral (Amendment) Act 2005 for full details of the constituencies for the 30th Dáil.

- Meath (5) was replaced by Meath East (3) and Meath West (3)
- Westmeath (3), Longford–Roscommon (4) and Sligo–Leitrim (4) were replaced by Longford–Westmeath (4), Roscommon–South Leitrim (3) and Sligo–North Leitrim (3)
- Cork North-Central (from 5 to 4)
- Dublin North-Central (from 4 to 3)
- Dublin Mid-West (from 3 to 4)
- Kildare North (from 3 to 4)

The preliminary findings from the 2006 Census of Population disclosed that the population of Dublin West, Dublin North and Meath East could have prompted further revisions. The advice of the Attorney-General was sought by the Minister for the Environment, Heritage and Local Government. It was decided to make no further constituency revisions before the election. Two outgoing deputies, however, challenged this decision in the High Court. The election went ahead while the parties awaited the High Court's reserved judgment in this action.

== Overview ==
The general election result was significant for a number of reasons:

- The election was considered a success for Fianna Fáil. It returned with a total of 78 seats, three fewer than it won at the previous general election, despite predictions earlier in the campaign that it could lose more than 20 seats.
- A resurgence in Fine Gael support, which saw the main opposition party increase its holding from 32 to 51 seats.
- A sharp drop in support for the Progressive Democrats, which saw their seats drop from 8 to 2, including the loss of party leader, Tánaiste and Minister for Justice, Equality and Law Reform Michael McDowell, who immediately retired from politics.
- The failure of the Labour Party to increase its seat total; it had a net loss of one seat.
- The failure of the smaller opposition parties to increase their support:
  - The Green Party returned with the same number of seats (6); one gain was offset by another loss.
  - Sinn Féin lost one seat to return 4 TDs, despite predictions of gains due to the return of the power-sharing executive in Northern Ireland.
  - Joe Higgins, the leader and sole TD of the Socialist Party lost his seat, leaving the party with no Dáil representation.
- The reduction in the number of independent (non-party) TDs to 5 from 14 in the previous general election.

The 2007 election results saw Fine Gael win seats at the expense of the smaller parties and independents. The proportion of votes only increased significantly for Fine Gael, and increased slightly for both the Green Party and Sinn Féin, despite their disappointing seat totals. Negotiations began the following week for the formation of the new government, with Bertie Ahern stating that his preferred option was for a coalition of Fianna Fáil, the Progressive Democrats and like-minded independents. The Fine Gael leader and Leader of the Opposition, Enda Kenny, did not rule out forming an alternative government, stating that he would talk to all parties except Fianna Fáil and Sinn Féin. The election for Taoiseach took place in the Dáil on 14 June 2007 with Bertie Ahern becoming Taoiseach again.

== Results ==
Party	Fianna Fáil	Fine Gael	Labour Party	Green Party	Sinn Féin	Progressive Democrats
Leader	Bertie Ahern	Enda Kenny	Pat Rabbitte	Trevor Sargent	Gerry Adams	Michael McDowell
Votes	41.56%, 858,565	27.32%, 564,428	10.13%, 209,175	4.69%, 96,936	6.94%, 143,410	2.73%, 56,396
Seats	78 (47.0%)	51 (30.9%)	20 (12.1%)	6 (3.6%)	4 (2.4%)	2 (1.2%)

↓
78	6	2	5	51	20	4
Fianna Fáil	Green	PDs	Others	Fine Gael	Labour Party	SF

Vote Share of different parties in the election.
1. Fianna Fáil (41.6%)
2. Fine Gael (27.3%)
3. Labour Party (10.1%)
4. Sinn Féin (6.90%)
5. Green Party (4.70%)
6. Progressive Democrats (2.70%)
7. Other (6.70%)

Election to the 30th Dáil – 24 May 2007
Party	Leader	Seats	±	% of seats	First pref. votes	% FPv	±%
Fianna Fáil	Bertie Ahern	78	▼3	47.0	858,565	41.56	▲0.1
Fine Gael	Enda Kenny	51	▲20	30.9	564,428	27.32	▲4.8
Labour	Pat Rabbitte	20	0	12.1	209,175	10.13	▼0.7
Green	Trevor Sargent	6	0	3.6	96,936	4.69	▲0.9
Sinn Féin	Gerry Adams	4	▼1	2.4	143,410	6.94	▲0.4
Progressive Democrats	Michael McDowell	2	▼6	1.2	56,396	2.73	▼1.3
Socialist Party	Joe Higgins	0	▼1	0	13,218	0.64	▼0.2
People Before Profit	N/A	0	N/A	0	9,333	0.45	N/A
Workers' Party	Seán Garland	0	0	0	3,026	0.15	▼<0.1
Christian Solidarity	Cathal Loftus	0	0	0	1,705	0.08	▼0.2
Fathers Rights	Liam Ó Gógáin	0	N/A	0	1,355	0.07	N/A
Immigration Control	Áine Ní Chonaill	0	N/A	0	1,329	0.06	N/A
Irish Socialist Network	N/A	0	N/A	0	505	0.02	N/A
Independent	N/A	5	▼8	3.0	106,429	5.15	▼3.8
Spoilt votes					19,435	—N/a	—N/a
Total		166	0	100	2,085,245	100	—N/a
Electorate/Turnout					3,110,914	67.0	—N/a

Notes

- The Fathers Rights-Responsibility Party, Immigration Control Platform and Irish Socialist Network were not registered as political parties, so their candidates appeared on ballot papers as "Non-Party".
- People Before Profit registered as a political party after the deadline for its party name to appear on ballot papers, so its candidates also appeared as "Non-Party".

=== Voting summary ===
First preference vote
Fianna Fáil	41.56%
Fine Gael	27.32%
Labour	10.13%
Sinn Féin	6.94%
Green	4.96%
Progressive Democrats	2.73%
Socialist	0.64%
Others	0.83%
Independent	5.15%

=== Seats summary ===
Dáil seats
Fianna Fáil	46.99%
Fine Gael	30.72%
Labour	12.05%
Green	3.61%
Sinn Féin	2.41%
Progressive Democrats	1.20%
Independent	3.01%

=== Turnout ===
The electorate eligible to vote as of 24 February 2007 was 3,110,914. As 2,085,245 first preference votes and invalid votes were cast, this equates to a voter turnout of 67.03%.

== Government formation ==
On 12 June 2007, Fianna Fáil and the Green Party reached agreement on a draft Programme for Government, this was subsequently ratified by the Fianna Fáil parliamentary party and Green Party members on 13 June 2007. This resulted in the formation of a coalition government on 14 June 2007 between Fianna Fáil, the Green Party and the Progressive Democrats. The government was initially supported by four Independent TDs.

Fianna Fáil, Green Party and Progressive Democrats formed the 27th government of Ireland, a majority coalition government, led by Bertie Ahern as Taoiseach. Ahern would resign the following year, succeeded by Brian Cowen, who formed the 28th government of Ireland with the same party composition. The Progressive Democrats dissolved in 2009.

== Dáil membership changes ==
The following changes took place as a result of the election:

- 19 outgoing TDs retired
- 146 outgoing TDs stood for re-election (plus Rory O'Hanlon – the Ceann Comhairle who was automatically returned)
  - 116 of those were re-elected
  - 30 failed to be re-elected
- 49 successor TDs were elected
  - 38 were elected for the first time
  - 11 had previously been TDs (* in the list below)
  - 14 were members of the outgoing Seanad († in the list below)
- There were 8 successor female TDs, decreasing the total by 1 to 22
- There were changes in 36 of the 43 constituencies contested

Outgoing TDs are listed in the constituency they represented in the outgoing Dáil. For Batt O'Keeffe and possibly others, this differs from the constituency they contested in the election. O'Keeffe, who was elected in his largely new constituency of Cork North-West, is listed both as a departing TD from his old constituency of Cork South-Central and a successor TD from Cork North-West. Where more than one change took place in a constituency the concept of successor is an approximation for presentation only.

Constituency	Departing TD	Party	Change	Comment	Successor TD	Party
Carlow–Kilkenny	Liam Aylward	Fianna Fáil	Retired	Elected as an MEP	Bobby Aylward	Fianna Fáil
Carlow–Kilkenny	Séamus Pattison	Labour Party	Retired		Mary White	Green Party
Cavan–Monaghan	Paudge Connolly	Independent	Lost seat		Margaret Conlon	Fianna Fáil
Clare	James Breen	Independent	Lost seat		Joe Carey	Fine Gael
Clare	Síle de Valera	Fianna Fáil	Retired		†Timmy Dooley	Fianna Fáil
Cork East	Joe Sherlock	Labour Party	Retired		Seán Sherlock	Labour Party
Cork North-Central	Dan Wallace	Fianna Fáil	Retired		Seat eliminated	
Cork North-West	Donal Moynihan	Fianna Fáil	Lost seat		Batt O'Keeffe	Fianna Fáil
Cork North-West	Gerard Murphy	Fine Gael	Lost seat		*Michael Creed	Fine Gael
Cork South-Central	Dan Boyle	Green Party	Lost seat		Ciarán Lynch	Labour Party
Cork South-Central	John Dennehy	Fianna Fáil	Lost seat		*Deirdre Clune	Fine Gael
Cork South-Central	Batt O'Keeffe	Fianna Fáil	Moved	Ran instead in Cork NW	Michael McGrath	Fianna Fáil
Cork South-West	Denis O'Donovan	Fianna Fáil	Lost seat		*P. J. Sheehan	Fine Gael
Cork South-West	Joe Walsh	Fianna Fáil	Retired		Christy O'Sullivan	Fianna Fáil
Donegal North-East	Cecilia Keaveney	Fianna Fáil	Lost seat		†Joe McHugh	Fine Gael
Donegal South-West	No membership changes					
Dublin Central	Dermot Fitzpatrick	Fianna Fáil	Retired		†Cyprian Brady	Fianna Fáil
Dublin Mid-West	Seat added				†Joanna Tuffy	Labour Party
Dublin North	Jim Glennon	Fianna Fáil	Retired		Michael Kennedy	Fianna Fáil
Dublin North	Seán Ryan	Labour Party	Retired		James Reilly	Fine Gael
Dublin North	G. V. Wright	Fianna Fáil	Retired		Darragh O'Brien	Fianna Fáil
Dublin North-Central	Ivor Callely	Fianna Fáil	Lost seat		Seat eliminated	
Dublin North-East	Martin Brady	Fianna Fáil	Lost seat		Terence Flanagan	Fine Gael
Dublin North-West	No membership changes					
Dublin South	Liz O'Donnell	Progressive Democrats	Lost seat		*Alan Shatter	Fine Gael
Dublin South-Central	Gay Mitchell	Fine Gael	Retired	Elected as an MEP	Catherine Byrne	Fine Gael
Dublin South-East	Michael McDowell	Progressive Democrats	Lost seat		Lucinda Creighton	Fine Gael
Dublin South-East	Eoin Ryan	Fianna Fáil	Retired	Elected as an MEP	Chris Andrews	Fianna Fáil
Dublin South-West	Seán Crowe	Sinn Féin	Lost seat		*†Brian Hayes	Fine Gael
Dublin West	Joe Higgins	Socialist Party	Lost seat		Leo Varadkar	Fine Gael
Dún Laoghaire	Fiona O'Malley	Progressive Democrats	Lost seat		*Seán Barrett	Fine Gael
Galway East	Joe Callanan	Fianna Fáil	Lost seat		*†Michael Kitt	Fianna Fáil
Galway East	Paddy McHugh	Independent	Lost seat		*†Ulick Burke	Fine Gael
Galway West	No membership changes					
Kerry North	No membership changes					
Kerry South	Breeda Moynihan-Cronin	Labour Party	Lost seat		Tom Sheahan	Fine Gael
Kildare North	Catherine Murphy	Independent	Lost seat		Áine Brady	Fianna Fáil
Kildare North	Seat added				Michael Fitzpatrick	Fianna Fáil
Kildare South	No membership changes					
Laois–Offaly	Tom Parlon	Progressive Democrats	Lost seat		*Charles Flanagan	Fine Gael
Limerick East	Tim O'Malley	Progressive Democrats	Lost seat		Kieran O'Donnell	Fine Gael
Limerick West	Michael Collins	Fianna Fáil	Retired		Niall Collins	Fianna Fáil
Longford–Westmeath	Donie Cassidy	Fianna Fáil	Lost seat		*†Mary O'Rourke	Fianna Fáil
Longford–Westmeath	Paul McGrath	Fine Gael	Retired		†James Bannon	Fine Gael
Longford–Westmeath	Mae Sexton	Progressive Democrats	Lost seat		Seat eliminated	
Louth	No membership changes					
Mayo	John Carty	Fianna Fáil	Lost seat		Dara Calleary	Fianna Fáil
Mayo	Jerry Cowley	Independent	Lost seat		John O'Mahony	Fine Gael
Meath East	Seat added				Thomas Byrne	Fianna Fáil
Meath West	No membership changes					
Roscommon–South Leitrim	John Ellis	Fianna Fáil	Lost seat		†Frank Feighan	Fine Gael
Sligo–North Leitrim	Marian Harkin	Independent	Retired	Elected as an MEP	†Eamon Scanlon	Fianna Fáil
Tipperary North	Michael Smith	Fianna Fáil	Lost seat		†Noel Coonan	Fine Gael
Tipperary South	Noel Davern	Fianna Fáil	Retired		Mattie McGrath	Fianna Fáil
Tipperary South	Séamus Healy	Independent	Lost seat		†Martin Mansergh	Fianna Fáil
Waterford	Ollie Wilkinson	Fianna Fáil	Lost seat		*†Brendan Kenneally	Fianna Fáil
Wexford	Tony Dempsey	Fianna Fáil	Retired		Seán Connick	Fianna Fáil
Wexford	Liam Twomey	Fine Gael	Lost seat		Michael W. D'Arcy	Fine Gael
Wicklow	Mildred Fox	Independent	Retired		Andrew Doyle	Fine Gael
Wicklow	Joe Jacob	Fianna Fáil	Retired		Joe Behan	Fianna Fáil

== Seanad election ==
The Dáil election was followed by the election to the 23rd Seanad.
