= Michael McDowell (politician) =

Irish politician (born 1951)

Senator Michael McDowell
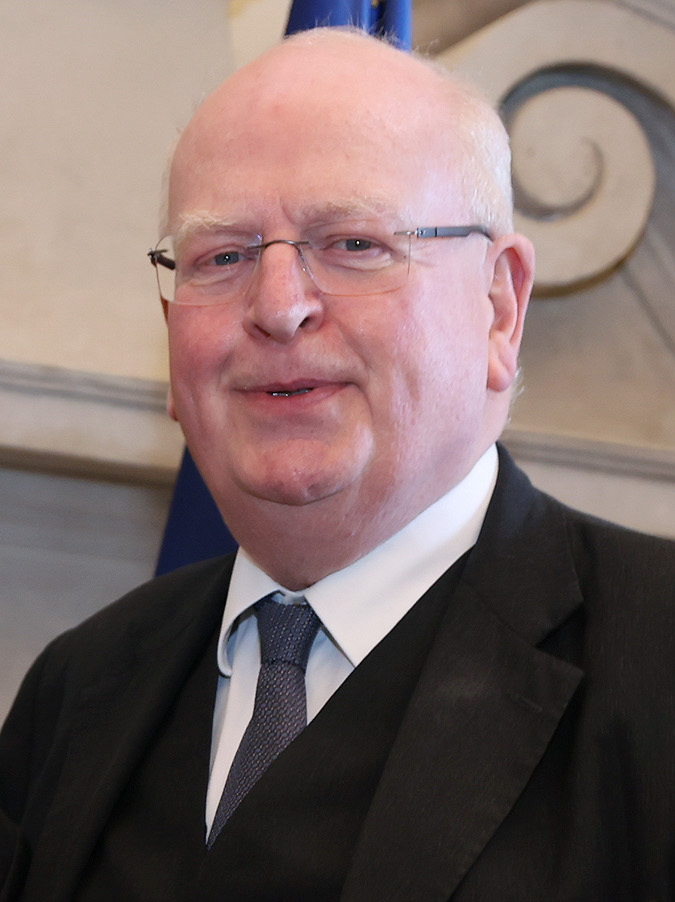
- McDowell in 2024

Senator
- Incumbent
- Assumed office 8 June 2016
- Constituency: National University

Tánaiste
- In office 13 September 2006 – 14 June 2007
- Taoiseach: Bertie Ahern
- Preceded by: Mary Harney
- Succeeded by: Brian Cowen

Minister for Justice, Equality and Law Reform
- In office 6 June 2002 – 14 June 2007
- Taoiseach: Bertie Ahern
- Preceded by: John O'Donoghue
- Succeeded by: Brian Lenihan

Leader of the Progressive Democrats
- In office 11 September 2006 – 25 May 2007
- Preceded by: Mary Harney
- Succeeded by: Mary Harney

Attorney General of Ireland
- In office 17 July 1999 – 6 June 2002
- Taoiseach: Bertie Ahern
- Preceded by: David Byrne
- Succeeded by: Rory Brady

Teachta Dála
- In office May 2002 – May 2007
- In office November 1992 – June 1997
- In office February 1987 – June 1989
- Constituency: Dublin South-East

Personal details
- Born: 1 May 1951 (age 75) Dublin, Ireland
- Party: Independent (2009–present)
- Other political affiliations: Fine Gael (until 1985); Progressive Democrats (1985–2009)
- Spouse: Niamh Brennan (m. 1979)
- Children: 3
- Education: University College Dublin

Military service
- Branch/service: Army Reserve
- Years of service: 1970–1981

Michael McDowell (born 1 May 1951) is an Irish independent politician and barrister. Active in Irish politics since the 1980s, he currently serves in Seanad Éireann as a senator for the National University constituency.

A grandson of Irish revolutionary Eoin MacNeill, McDowell was educated at Gonzaga College and studied law at University College Dublin and King's Inns. He began practicing as a barrister in 1974, becoming a senior counsel in 1987. Initially a member of Fine Gael, he co-founded the Progressive Democrats in the mid-1980s and was elected three times as a TD for the Dublin South-East constituency, serving in the 25th Dáil (1987–1989), the 27th Dáil (1992–1997), and the 29th Dáil (2002–2007). He served as Attorney General of Ireland from 1999 to 2002 and as Minister for Justice, Equality and Law Reform from 2002 to 2007.

After Mary Harney resigned as leader of the Progressive Democrats in September 2006, McDowell became party leader and Tánaiste. He led the party into the 2007 general election, where it lost six of its eight seats in Dáil Éireann, including his own. McDowell resigned immediately as party leader—his brief tenure having made him the shortest-serving party leader in the history of the state—and left public life to resume his private legal career. The Progressive Democrats were formally dissolved in 2009. McDowell returned to politics as an independent in 2016 and was elected to Seanad Éireann, to which he was re-elected in 2020 and 2025. He was regarded as instrumental in opposing the March 2024 constitutional referendums on Family and Care, both of which were comprehensively defeated.

== Early life ==
Born in Dublin, he was educated at the Jesuit school Gonzaga College, then at University College Dublin where he became auditor of the UCD Law Society. He later attended the King's Inns in Dublin where he achieved the Barrister-at-Law degree in 1974. McDowell was a junior counsel on the legal team that defended the murderer Malcolm MacArthur in the notorious GUBU case. In 2002, McDowell excused himself from considering MacArthur's parole report, to avoid any possible conflict of interest arising from this representation. He was appointed a senior counsel in 1987. He is the husband of UCD accountancy Professor Niamh Brennan and brother of UCD economics lecturer Moore McDowell.

== Political career ==
He became involved in politics, initially as a member of Fine Gael. He contested the 1979 Dublin Corporation election, coming 5th in the 4-seat Area 10 (Mansion House/Pembroke).

When Desmond O'Malley was expelled from Fianna Fáil in 1985, McDowell immediately wrote to him in support, becoming a founding member of the Progressive Democrats (the PDs). McDowell was one of 14 PDs elected as TDs to the 25th Dáil at the 1987 general election, the first election after the party was founded. He was elected for the Dublin South-East constituency. He lost his seat at the 1989 general election but was made chairman of the party. McDowell regained his seat at the 1992 general election but lost it again at the 1997 general election. At various times, he served as a member of the Progressive Democrats front bench in roles as spokesman for foreign affairs, Northern Ireland and finance. In July 1999, while the PDs were in a coalition government with Fianna Fáil, McDowell was appointed Attorney General of Ireland, a position he held until 2002. In 2000, he proposed changing the name of the party to the Radical Party.

=== Minister for Justice, Equality and Law Reform ===
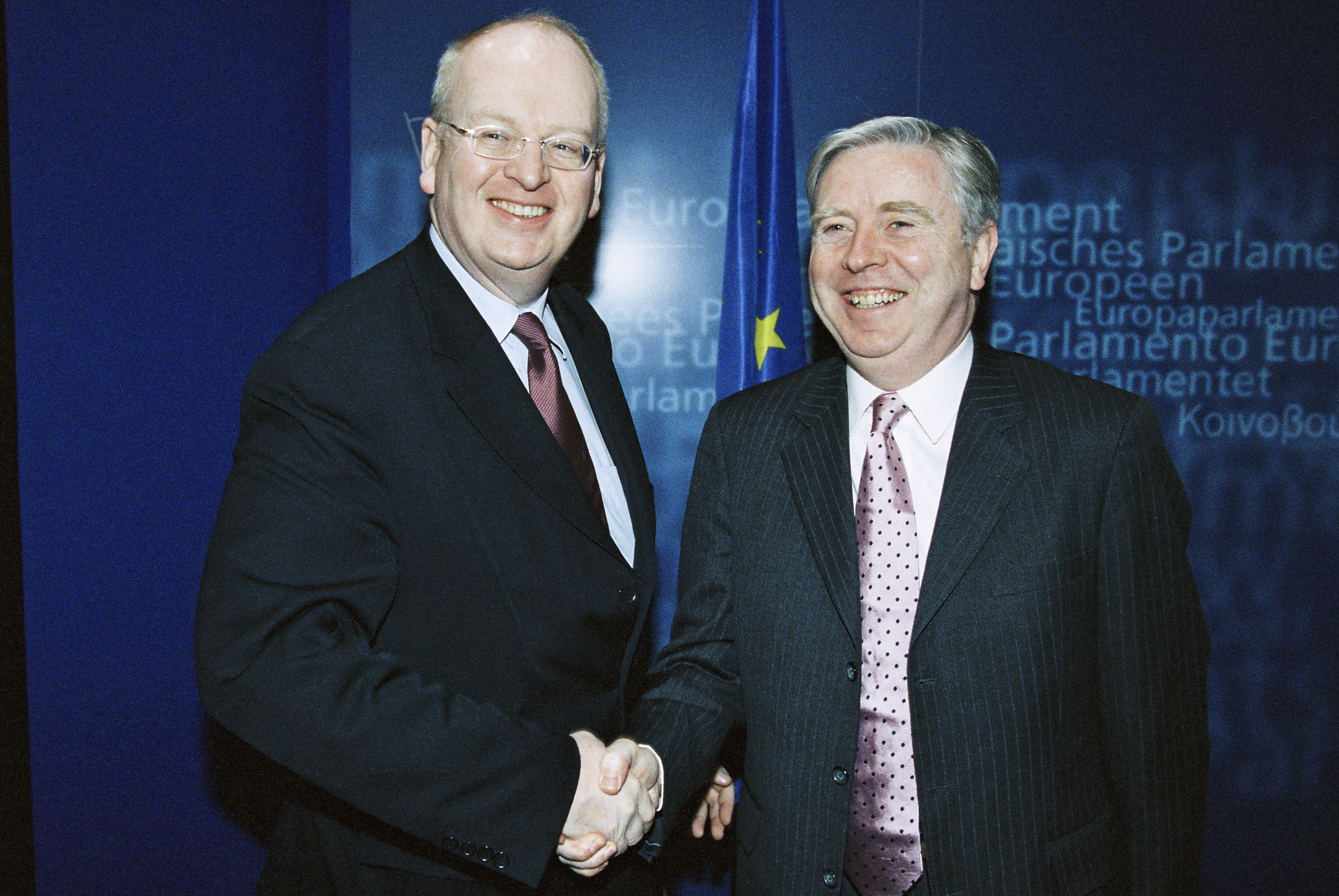
McDowell and Pat Cox in 2004

Following the 2002 general election, McDowell regained his Dáil seat. This was the first time McDowell combined winning a Dáil seat with his party's entry into government. He was appointed to the cabinet as Minister for Justice, Equality and Law Reform. He was a strong opponent of the policies of Sinn Féin and the Provisional Irish Republican Army, and often took a harder line than his coalition partners, Fianna Fáil. He was named as Politician of the Year for 2004 in the Magill magazine annual awards.

In 2005, he announced plans to introduce Anti-Social Behaviour Orders, although not in the same form as those in Britain. McDowell's Intoxicating Liquor Act 2003 prohibited cut-price drinks promotions and placed restrictions on alcohol advertising, as well as making it mandatory for under-21s to have proof of age when drinking in pubs. This law also banned under-18s from pubs after 9 p.m., a regulation that was highly unpopular and was later relaxed to 10pm during the summer months. In 2005, McDowell proposed to grant licences for café-bars which would have a limited capacity and serve meals as well as alcohol. It was hoped that this would combat binge drinking by introducing a more European "café culture". This initiative was dropped owing to objections from publicans and members of his coalition partners, Fianna Fáil.

In 2004, he proposed a citizenship referendum to end the automatic right to Irish citizenship for those born on the island of Ireland. The referendum was passed with an 80% majority. The referendum was criticised by the some in the opposition, who accused McDowell of pandering to racist elements. He reformed the private security industry, regulating it for the first time under the Private Security Services Act 2004 and establishing the Private Security Authority.

McDowell launched far-reaching reforms of the Garda Síochána and introduced severe penalties (up to five years in jail) for Gardaí who leaked information under the Garda Síochána Act 2005, after the force was extensively criticised by the Morris and Barr Tribunals and he was embarrassed by high-profile leaks of his plans for the force to newspapers from high-level Gardaí. He also introduced a voluntary ancillary branch of the police force despite huge resistance from paid employees. McDowell's Criminal Justice (Terrorist Offences) Act, 2005 on telecommunications data retention compels service providers to store all telephone, SMS and internet records for three years and provide them to Gardaí on request. The Digital Rights Ireland campaign group has filed a suit against the government in the High Court claiming that this law is a breach of the constitutional right to privacy.

His Defamation Bill of 2006 proposed a radical reform of Irish defamation law, replacing the torts of libel and slander with one single offence of "defamation" and allowing the press to plead "fair and reasonable publication" as a defence in defamation cases. Related to the defamation reforms, McDowell also proposed a new privacy law which was heavily criticised by the newspaper industry. In 2006, he established the Balance in Criminal Law Review Group, and in 2007 oversaw the enactment of their recommendation to roll back the right to silence.

==== Controversies ====
As Justice Minister, McDowell attracted a good deal of controversy:

- McDowell authorised the purchase of a farm in north Fingal, at Thornton Hall, on behalf of the state, to build a proposed prison. However this was more expensive compared to the value of similar land close by, and several state organisations already had land closer to the city which might have been used for the same purpose.
- He sped up the deportation of failed asylum seekers, including one case in 2005 where a student, Kunle Eluhanla, was deported back to Nigeria while preparing for his Leaving Certificate examinations. After a public outcry led by Eluhanla's classmates, McDowell allowed his return, but not that of others.
- In February 2005, he accused the Sinn Féin leaders Gerry Adams, Martin McGuinness and Martin Ferris of being members of the Provisional IRA Army Council. The allegations were denied by Adams, McGuinness and Ferris.
- In 2004, McDowell called killings by gangs the "sting of a dying wasp", intimating that gangland killings were coming to an end. However, there were a record number of gun killings in Ireland in 2006 (25 in total), including five murders in six days in December. McDowell has stated that "soft" judges are partly to blame for these killings for granting bail to gang suspects despite Garda objections. These statements have caused anger in the legal profession. One unnamed legal professional described McDowell's statements as "outrageous" and "bordering on impeachable". In an unprecedented protest, dozens of senior judges boycotted a 2006 Christmas reception given by McDowell. He has been openly criticised by retired judge Fergus Flood over McDowell's remarks about the failure of judges to implement the law on bail and mandatory sentences for drug dealing. Flood said the judiciary must have the right to consider each individual case as appropriate and that McDowell should consider the context of his remarks before making statements.
- In May 2005, when addressing the Oireachtas Justice Committee, he made a number of comments insinuating that most asylum seekers were not legally entitled to stay in Ireland and regretting his inability to deport them forthwith because of due process.
- On 13 December 2005, using Dáil privilege, he claimed that Frank Connolly, an investigative journalist and a brother of one of the 'Colombia Three', had travelled to Colombia under a false passport. McDowell subsequently leaked the alleged faked passport application to a friend, the journalist Sam Smyth of the Irish Independent. McDowell was widely accused of abusing his power as Minister for Justice for political purposes, and prejudicing any potential police investigation. Although Connolly denied McDowell's accusations, the controversy led to Irish American private donor Chuck Feeney withdrawing funding from the Centre for Public Inquiry, an investigative organisation which had published two reports embarrassing the government, of which Frank Connolly was the director, after McDowell met with him.
- On 20 March 2006, he apologised for calling the Opposition spokesperson on Finance, Richard Bruton, TD, "the Joseph Goebbels of Irish political life". He had made these remarks after Bruton had highlighted to the Dáil that despite McDowell's claims of increases in Garda personnel in 2005, only 6 extra gardaí had been added to the Dublin police force in that year. McDowell maintained that Bruton specifically chose to compare dates that did not accurately reflect a general increase in Garda numbers. He apologised for the remarks on the "Morning Ireland" radio programme on RTÉ the next day.
- In March 2006, he falsely claimed that Green Party 'people' were responsible for vandalising Progressive Democrats headquarters. He later withdrew the comment, but then appeared to repeat it again.
- In May 2006, the Supreme Court of Ireland struck down the law on statutory rape as unconstitutional as it did not allow an individual accused to enter the defence of reasonable belief that the victim was of age. The Supreme Court's decision surprised the whole country, and in the aftermath, McDowell was widely criticised for failing to anticipate the decision.
- On 27 September 2006, he criticised the Taoiseach Bertie Ahern for accepting money from businessmen in 1993 and 1994, calling it unethical and an "error of judgement" and said that the money must be repaid with interest. The statement was greeted with derision by the Opposition, with Fine Gael claiming it was motivated by the Progressive Democrats determination to keep Fianna Fáil in power. Labour Party leader Pat Rabbitte said the Progressive Democrats were now handcuffed to Fianna Fáil for the duration of this Dáil, and that there might as well be single-party Government.
- On 6 March 2007, McDowell apologised to the Dáil for omissions from an Act that he had enacted in 2006 on the protection of children from sex abusers in the Second Stage debate on the Criminal Law (Sexual Offences) (Amendment) Bill 2007 in the Dáil, saying: "The primary purpose of this short Bill is to remedy an error in the Criminal Law (Sexual Offences) Act 2006. The particular point with which we are dealing was brought to my attention last week by Deputy Rabbitte, for which I thank him. It was a drafting error for which I am politically accountable and regretful."

=== Party leadership ===
In June 2006, McDowell was involved in a leadership dispute with party leader Mary Harney, over an alleged promise by Harney to step down in favour of him. The dispute appeared to have been resolved with Harney remaining as leader. On 7 September 2006, Mary Harney unexpectedly resigned as party leader and McDowell became the favourite to succeed her in the consequent leadership election. Irish media reported on 10 September 2006 that Michael McDowell would be the sole nominee for party leadership, Liz O'Donnell would become Deputy Leader and that Tom Parlon would become Party President. On 11 September 2006 McDowell was confirmed as party leader and on 13 September 2006, he was appointed Tánaiste.

=== 2007 general election and resignation as party leader ===
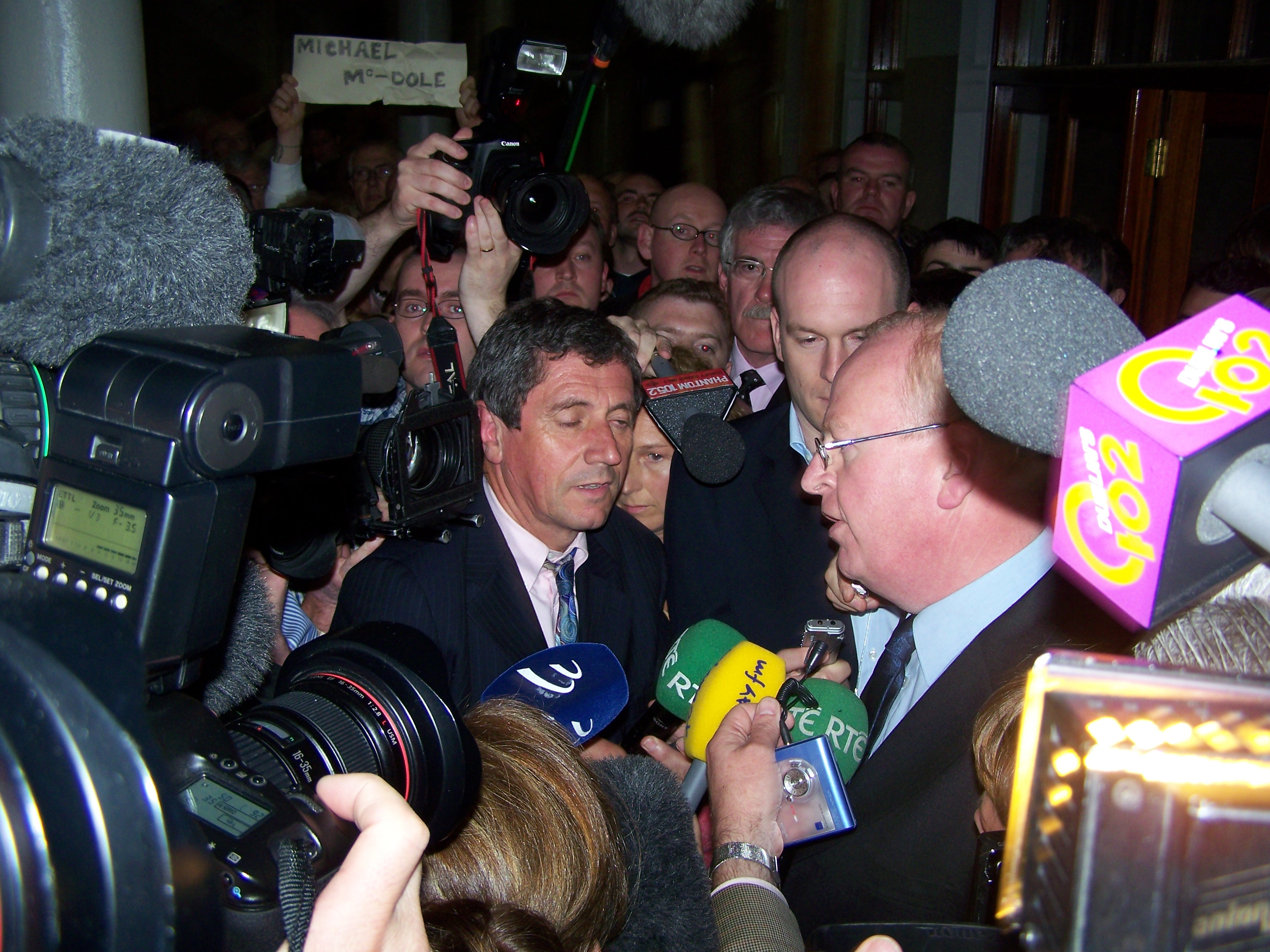
McDowell (right) announces his retirement.

During the 2007 general election campaign, the Progressive Democrats erected posters bearing the slogan, "Left wing government? No thanks". This was an echo of their 2002 election campaign when they issued posters bearing the slogan; "One party government? No thanks" which then targeted Fianna Fáil. In 2007 their target was the Green Party. While McDowell was unveiling the poster during a press briefing in Ranelagh which was the site of his telegraph pole climb in the 2002 election; constituency opponent John Gormley of the Green party turned up to confront McDowell on the issue of an accompanying pamphlet which made misleading claims about the Green party. The ensuing exchange between them was dubbed the Rumble in Ranelagh by the media. During the 2007 RTÉ Television election debate, McDowell remarked on the state of the opposition parties: "I'm surrounded by the left, the hard-left and the left-overs."

Although he had a high profile as party leader, Tánaiste and Minister for Justice, McDowell's vote dropped from 6,093 (18.8%) in the 2002 general election to 4,450 (13.2%) in the 2007 general election. He was beaten for the last seat in the Dublin South-East constituency by John Gormley by a margin of 304 votes. He was the first sitting Tánaiste to lose his seat, and his subsequent departure from politics makes him the "shortest-serving political-party leader in the history of the State". He stated that his time as a public representative was over. On 25 May 2007, McDowell resigned as leader of the Progressive Democrats and announced that he was quitting politics, immediately and without consultation with his party colleagues, after losing his seat in the Dublin South-East constituency in the general election, while the party fell from eight seats to two.

The reaction of the press was divided:

That McDowell's career in government as Tánaiste is over is partly of his own making as he courted controversy to such a fevered extent that he became the most unpopular political leader in the country.
McDowell's reforms of the prison service, the Gardaí and immigration policy are a monument to his five years as Minister for Justice.

The Minister for Enterprise, Trade and Employment Micheál Martin, said he was sad to learn of his cabinet colleague's decision to resign. He said "he will be a significant loss" and called him a very formidable parliamentarian.

=== Electoral results ===
Elections to the Dáil
Party	Election		FPv	FPv%	Result
Progressive Democrats	Dublin South-East	1987	5,961	15.6	Elected on count 14/15
Progressive Democrats	Dublin South-East	1989	2,853	8.7	Eliminated on count 6/9
Progressive Democrats	Dublin South-East	1992	4,504	11.2	Elected on count 12/12
Progressive Democrats	Dublin South-East	1997	4,022	10.9	Eliminated on count 11/11
Progressive Democrats	Dublin South-East	2002	6,093	18.8	Elected on count 4/6
Progressive Democrats	Dublin South-East	2007	4,450	13.2	Eliminated on count 5/5

== Election to Seanad Éireann ==
In 2016, McDowell stood for election to Seanad Éireann for the National University constituency. He was elected on the 26th count. He was re-elected to the Seanad in 2020. He was re-elected again in 2025.

=== 2024 constitutional referendums on Family and Care ===
McDowell opposed two proposed amendments to the Constitution of Ireland, the Thirty-ninth Amendment on the Family, which proposed to expand the constitutional definition of family to include durable relationships outside marriage, and the Fortieth Amendment on Care, which proposed to replace references to women's "life within the home" and the constitutional obligation to "endeavour to ensure that mothers shall not be obliged by economic necessity to engage in labour to the neglect of their duties in the home” with a new article on supporting care within the family.

Prior to the 2024 Irish constitutional referendums, McDowell formed an ad hoc group of barristers, Lawyers for No, to voice concern about the potential legal consequences—in areas including family law, tax law, and succession rights—of the proposed amendments. The group also included Michael McNamara, Brenda Power, and Maria Steen. Despite having the political support of all major political parties, both proposed amendments were comprehensively rejected, respectively by 67.7 and 73.9 percent of voters. McDowell was regarded as having played an instrumental role in the outcome.

=== 2025 Irish presidential election nomination ===
In August 2025, Steen announced her intent to seek nominations to run in the 2025 Irish presidential election as an independent candidate. She secured 18 nominations from members of the Oireachtas, but her candidacy failed after she could not reach the required threshold of 20 nominations by the deadline of noon on 24 September. McDowell was among the independent TDs and senators who opted not to nominate her, despite having campaigned alongside her in the lead-up to the previous year's constitutional referendums. The Irish Times reported that McDowell was "getting most of the blame" from Steen's supporters over the failure of her campaign, including an "online backlash". McDowell subsequently stated in The Irish Times that he did not nominate Steen because, as a liberal, he would have been opposed to a socially conservative and anti-abortion Catholic as president. "It would have been divisive and a step backwards for the kind of Ireland I believe in," he said.

== Legal career ==
After losing his Dáil seat, McDowell returned to work as a senior counsel. In addition, he receives annual pension payments of €60,388, which he donates to charity. He represented the Irish Recorded Music Association in their case to force Eircom and UPC to filter their customers' Internet access and in some cases cut off their access completely.

== Political views and profile ==
McDowell has described himself as a "Liberal" and a "Liberal [Irish] republican", someone who seeks a united Ireland under a liberal democracy and part of the European Union, as opposed to a 32-county socialist republic possibly outside of the EU. Known for his hard-nosed approach to politics in the 1990s and 2000s, Charles Haughey once described McDowell as "the nastiest piece of work who ever crawled into the Dail". The Phoenix, a political magazine which writes from an Irish republican viewpoint, has suggested that from 2016 onwards, McDowell moved from a hard-edged, uncompromising centre-right figure known for his combative style to more of a centrist and pragmatic politician, presenting himself as a liberal statesman open to cross-party collaboration, focused on constitutional reform, local issues, and civil liberties rather than the ideological confrontations that had defined his earlier career.

=== Economics ===
McDowell was one of the intellectual architects of the Progressive Democrats' low-tax, pro-business programme that shaped Irish policymaking through the Celtic Tiger years. As the party's finance spokesman and later as a senior minister and party leader, he consistently argued for tax cuts, deregulation and a smaller state role in the economy, saying the PDs existed to deliver "radical" tax reform and enterprise-friendly measures. The PDs' record in government (cuts to income-tax rates, big reductions in capital gains and corporation tax and a general deregulatory agenda) is routinely associated with McDowell's agenda and public lobbying. Between the 2002 and 2007, the Fianna Fáil-Progressive Democrats government implemented significant tax reductions and pro-enterprise reforms that PD sources and supporters credit to the PD's influence in coalition negotiations: lower income tax bands, a reduced top rate in practice, big falls in capital gains tax and the establishment of a competitive 12.5 per cent corporation tax rate that became central to Ireland's inward investment strategy. McDowell publicly defended these policies as necessary to sustain growth and employment and frequently urged ministers to "hold to the Government’s liberal economic policy agenda".

=== Irish republicanism and Northern Ireland ===
McDowell's grandfather Eoin MacNeill, was the founder of the Irish Volunteers, who became the Irish Republican Army of the Irish War of Independence.

McDowell has a complex relationship with Irish republicanism; although he identifies himself as an Irish republican, during the 1990s and 2000s, he was considered one of the arch-opponents of the ideology in the Republic of Ireland. As Attorney General and then Justice Minister, he frequently attacked republican leaders and organisations; in a radio interview in February 2005, he named Sinn Féin figures (such as Gerry Adams and Martin McGuinness) as members of the IRA Army Council while on other occasions McDowell compared the Provisionals to the Nazis. In 2005, McDowell compared the Irish republican newspaper Daily Ireland to Nazi propaganda. In 2003, McDowell publicly claimed that Sinn Féin's funding was directly linked to criminal activities by the IRA and described the party as "morally unclean". He argued that senior IRA figures were engaging in crime to support the republican movement and rejected the idea that Sinn Féin's finances were separate from these activities. However, privately in 2000 as attorney general, McDowell pitched royal pardons for members of the Provisional IRA during negotiations with the British government.

Amidst these criticisms of the Provisionals in the 2000s, McDowell stated "When I look at people who now say I am anti-republican, I repeat that I am more republican than anyone in Sinn Féin" and that "I think the IRA and the Provos have bastardised republicanism completely". McDowell claimed his family had done more for Irish unification than any Provisional. McDowell cited that his grandfather, Eoin MacNeill, was the founder of the Irish Volunteers, who became the Irish Republican Army of the Irish War of Independence, and that his uncle Brian MacNeill had died fighting for the Anti-Treaty IRA during the Irish Civil War.

In 2022 McDowell argued that "true" Irish republicans like himself should focus on reconciliation and practical unity (“Shared Island”) rather than maximalist demands, saying "reconciliation of Orange and Green is the true vocation of true republicans". On 21 July 2010, McDowell suggested at the McGill Summer School that The Twelfth - 12 July, celebrated by Northern Ireland Protestants in commemoration of the Battle of Aughrim (1691) and Battle of the Boyne (1690) should be a public holiday in Ireland.

In 2025, during an Irish high court case involving Gerry Adams, McDowell testified that Adams was widely regarded as a leading member of the IRA, including as part of its army council, and that Irish government officials held similar views based on intelligence briefings. McDowell acknowledged Sinn Féin's role in the peace process but said he abominated the party's past actions and "dishonesty", asserting that Adams misrepresented himself as a mediator while being a dominant figure in the IRA.

=== Social issues ===
On social issues, McDowell has generally cast himself as a liberal. In 2025, he stressed that since first entering the Oireachtas in 1987, he has been "consistently liberal on social and economic matters". In public debates, he supported the Yes side of referendums on divorce, same‑sex marriage and repealing the abortion ban.

In 2002, Michael McDowell, serving as Attorney General, publicly supported the government's proposed abortion legislation and encouraged a yes vote in the referendum. He argued that the proposals would appeal to the middle ground between pro-choice and pro-life extremes and would bring closure to two decades of legislative inaction on abortion. McDowell emphasised that the public should read the legislation before voting and predicted that a consensus would form around the government's approach. In 2018, McDowell clarified that he did not personally support introducing stricter anti-abortion laws during the 2002 referendum, explaining that, in his role as Attorney General, he was obliged to represent the government's position. He did not disclose how he personally voted at the time. By then, McDowell publicly endorsed repealing the Eighth Amendment, arguing that it had prevented justice for Irish women and girls.

In 2025, McDowell declined to join a pro‑life presidential nominating caucus in 2025 and publicly said the election of a conservative Catholic candidate, Maria Steen, would have been a "step backwards" for the Ireland he believes in.

=== Immigration ===
As Minister for Justice between 2002 and 2007, McDowell made immigration control and the ending of unconditional birthright citizenship signature issues; in later years, writing and speaking as a senator and commentator, he has continued to press for tighter management of asylum and migration while criticising what he regards as inadequate EU responses.

McDowell played a leading role in the 2004 referendum that removed automatic constitutional entitlement to Irish citizenship for everyone born on the island of Ireland. As Justice Minister, he proposed and campaigned for the Twenty-seventh Amendment, arguing that the constitutional wording then in place made it very difficult to control immigration and that Ireland needed to bring its rules "in line with the rest of Europe". He published departmental figures and public arguments that alleged a significant share of non-EU births in Irish maternity hospitals were connected to what was often labelled "citizenship tourism". Opponents said the campaign played to xenophobic sentiment and risked stigmatising migrants. The referendum passed by a large margin in June 2004.

In the 2020s, McDowell has argued that recent years have seen “uncontrolled asylum” used as a cover for economic migration and that Irish and EU institutions have lacked the competence or political will to manage this properly. He has been critical of the EU migration pact. He has proposed stronger emergency measures for housing and processing refugees in Ireland, including temporary emergency legislation when systems are under acute strain. He has said that concerns expressed by many citizens about the scale and pace of migration are not simply far-right rhetoric and must be addressed.

Legal offices
Preceded by David Byrne	Attorney General of Ireland; 1999–2002	Succeeded by Rory Brady
Political offices
Preceded by John O'Donoghue	Minister for Justice, Equality and Law Reform; 2002–2007	Succeeded by Brian Lenihan
Preceded by Mary Harney	Tánaiste; 2006–2007	Succeeded by Brian Cowen
Party political offices
Preceded by Mary Harney	Leader of the Progressive Democrats; 2006–2007	Succeeded by Mary Harney

Dáil	Election	Deputy (Party)	Deputy (Party)	Deputy (Party)	Deputy (Party)
13th	1948	John A. Costello (FG)	Seán MacEntee (FF)	Noël Browne (CnaP)	3 seats 1948–1981
14th	1951	John A. Costello (FG)	Seán MacEntee (FF)	Noël Browne (Ind.)	3 seats 1948–1981
15th	1954	John A. Costello (FG)	Seán MacEntee (FF)	John O'Donovan (FG)	3 seats 1948–1981
16th	1957	John A. Costello (FG)	Seán MacEntee (FF)	Noël Browne (Ind.)	3 seats 1948–1981
17th	1961	John A. Costello (FG)	Seán MacEntee (FF)	Noël Browne (NPD)	3 seats 1948–1981
18th	1965	John A. Costello (FG)	Seán MacEntee (FF)	Seán Moore (FF)	3 seats 1948–1981
19th	1969	Garret FitzGerald (FG)	Noël Browne (Lab)	Seán Moore (FF)	3 seats 1948–1981
20th	1973	Garret FitzGerald (FG)	Fergus O'Brien (FG)	Seán Moore (FF)	3 seats 1948–1981
21st	1977	Garret FitzGerald (FG)	Ruairi Quinn (Lab)	Seán Moore (FF)	3 seats 1948–1981
22nd	1981	Garret FitzGerald (FG)	Gerard Brady (FF)	Seán Moore (FF)	Richie Ryan (FG)
23rd	1982 (Feb)	Garret FitzGerald (FG)	Gerard Brady (FF)	Ruairi Quinn (Lab)	Alexis FitzGerald Jnr (FG)
24th	1982 (Nov)	Garret FitzGerald (FG)	Gerard Brady (FF)	Ruairi Quinn (Lab)	Joe Doyle (FG)
25th	1987	Garret FitzGerald (FG)	Gerard Brady (FF)	Ruairi Quinn (Lab)	Michael McDowell (PDs)
26th	1989	Garret FitzGerald (FG)	Gerard Brady (FF)	Ruairi Quinn (Lab)	Joe Doyle (FG)
27th	1992	Frances Fitzgerald (FG)	Eoin Ryan Jnr (FF)	Ruairi Quinn (Lab)	Michael McDowell (PDs)
28th	1997	Frances Fitzgerald (FG)	Eoin Ryan Jnr (FF)	Ruairi Quinn (Lab)	John Gormley (GP)
29th	2002	Michael McDowell (PDs)	Eoin Ryan Jnr (FF)	Ruairi Quinn (Lab)	John Gormley (GP)
30th	2007	Lucinda Creighton (FG)	Chris Andrews (FF)	Ruairi Quinn (Lab)	John Gormley (GP)
31st	2011	Lucinda Creighton (FG)	Eoghan Murphy (FG)	Ruairi Quinn (Lab)	Kevin Humphreys (Lab)
32nd	2016	Constituency abolished. See Dublin Bay South.			
