= Tom Parlon =

Irish former politician (born 1953

Minister of State
- 2002–2007: Finance

Teachta Dála
- In office May 2002 – May 2007
- Constituency: Laois–Offaly

Personal details
- Born: 19 August 1953 (age 73) County Offaly, Ireland
- Party: Progressive Democrats

Tom Parlon (born 19 August 1953) is an Irish former Progressive Democrats politician. He was a Teachta Dála (TD) for the Laois–Offaly constituency from 2002 to 2007 and was also the Minister of State at the Department of Finance with special responsibility for the Office of Public Works. He later served as the Director General of the Construction Industry Federation of Ireland.

== Early life and politics ==
Parlon was educated at Coolderry National School, Roscrea CBS, and Gurteen College. He was elected to Dáil Éireann for the Laois–Offaly constituency at the 2002 general election as a Progressive Democrats candidate. He was appointed Minister of State on one of his first days in the Dáil. Previous to being a politician Parlon held a number of senior positions in the Irish Farmers' Association, including Deputy President (1991–1993) and President (1997–2001). In the period before the 2002 general election, it was some time before he could make up his mind whether to stand for Fine Gael or the Progressive Democrats. He became President of the Progressive Democrats party in September 2006 after Michael McDowell took over as party leader. He lost his seat at the 2007 general election despite running one of the most expensive campaigns in the election.

He announced on 10 July 2007, that he was quitting politics and would not seek a nomination to Seanad Éireann, or to contest the leadership of the Progressive Democrats. Instead he took up the position of Director General of the Irish Construction Industry Federation, receiving an annual salary of €250,000.

== Complaint to Standards Commission ==
A complaint about Parlon appearing in an advertisement for animal feed was made to the Standards in Public Office Commission. The Commission advised that it is not appropriate for a serving office holder to be associated with the commercial promotion of particular products unconnected with the official duties of that person.

== Further Complaints ==
In December 2003 Parlon was attacked by fellow ministers for claiming the decentralisation plan being implemented in Laois was because of his decision, when in fact he had no input into the plan at all and was only a junior by-stander. Also in taking up his position as Director General of the Construction Industry Federation in 2007, after having a prominent position in the Office of Public Works have led to accusations of a conflict of interest..

In 2008, Parlon publicly took credit for effecting a policy reversal by the Department of Finance on the procurement procedure for State building projects. After his lobbying, Minister for Finance Brian Lenihan agreed to allow €150m of water service projects to go ahead under old "costs plus" contracts rather than the "fixed price" contracts. In fact, the reversal was due to an administrative decision amongst local authorities and not as a consequence of any lobbying.

== Post political career ==
=== Construction Industry Federation ===
Parlon was appointed as Director General of the Construction Industry Federation (CIF) in July 2007. His appointment coincided with the downturn in the construction sector and the economy in general.

As head of the CIF, Parlon was strongly opposed to the formation of NAMA, which has taken over many of the distressed loans of members of the CIF. In May 2009, the Sunday Independent newspaper reported that Parlon was raising a multimillion-euro warchest from developers to fund research to look at ways to oppose the formation of the National Asset Management Agency and potentially take a legal action against it.

The warchest was to be overseen through a sub-committee within CIF. This sub-committee and the collection of the €2,000 levy was opposed by the Irish Property Council which stated: "It is not understood if or how a sub-committee of the CIF has a mandate which allows it represent property developers in all of the current areas of concern as against the interests of the construction industry as a whole".

Parlon's tenure in CIF has also seen the deterioration in industrial relations in the construction industry. On 7 July 2009, in an interview with Pat Kenny, Parlon controversially referred to striking electricians and their union as "lunatics".

By 12 July 2009, Parlon and the Electrical Contractors Association had agreed to pay the striking electricians a pay increase of 4.9%, rather than a pay cut of 10% which he had publicly demanded. The pay increases had been due for a number of years.

In November 2010, a leading member of the Construction Industry Federation, and the NAMA sub-committee openly called for Parlon's resignation. In an email to members, Cork-based developer Michael O'Flynn noted that Parlon had publicly "attack[ed] and ridicule[d] the very people he purports to represent. If we must take abuse from other members of society, so be it; but for abuse to be self-inflicted by a man whose salary we pay is unforgivable."

=== Possible return to politics ===
In September 2010, Parlon was quoted as "thinking about" seeking the Fine Gael nomination for the Laois–Offaly constituency following the decision of the Offaly-based Olwyn Enright not to seek re-election to Dáil Éireann. In the end, he did not contest the election.

=== Irish Data Centre Supplier Alliance ===
In February 2026, Parlon was announced as the first chair of the Irish Data Centre Supplier Alliance, an organisation representing Irish companies in the data centre supply chain.

Political offices
Preceded by Martin Cullen	Minister of State at the Department of Finance; 2002–2007	Succeeded by Noel Ahern

Dáil	Election	Deputy (Party)	Deputy (Party)	Deputy (Party)	Deputy (Party)	Deputy (Party)
2nd	1921	Joseph Lynch (SF)	Patrick McCartan (SF)	Francis Bulfin (SF)	Kevin O'Higgins (SF)	4 seats 1921–1923
3rd	1922	William Davin (Lab)	Patrick McCartan (PT-SF)	Francis Bulfin (PT-SF)	Kevin O'Higgins (PT-SF)	4 seats 1921–1923
4th	1923	William Davin (Lab)	Laurence Brady (Rep)	Francis Bulfin (CnaG)	Patrick Egan (CnaG)	Seán McGuinness (Rep)
4th	1926 by-election	William Davin (Lab)	Laurence Brady (Rep)	Francis Bulfin (CnaG)	Patrick Egan (CnaG)	James Dwyer (CnaG)
5th	1927 (Jun)	William Davin (Lab)	Patrick Boland (FF)	Thomas Tynan (FF)	John Gill (Lab)	James Dwyer (CnaG)
6th	1927 (Sep)	William Davin (Lab)	Patrick Boland (FF)	Patrick Gorry (FF)	William Aird (CnaG)	James Dwyer (CnaG)
7th	1932	William Davin (Lab)	Patrick Boland (FF)	Patrick Gorry (FF)	Thomas F. O'Higgins (CnaG)	Eugene O'Brien (CnaG)
8th	1933	William Davin (Lab)	Patrick Boland (FF)	Eamon Donnelly (FF)	Thomas F. O'Higgins (CnaG)	Jack Finlay (NCP)
9th	1937	William Davin (Lab)	Patrick Boland (FF)	Patrick Gorry (FF)	Thomas F. O'Higgins (FG)	Jack Finlay (FG)
10th	1938	William Davin (Lab)	Patrick Boland (FF)	Patrick Gorry (FF)	Thomas F. O'Higgins (FG)	Daniel Hogan (FF)
11th	1943	William Davin (Lab)	Patrick Boland (FF)	Patrick Gorry (FF)	Thomas F. O'Higgins (FG)	Oliver J. Flanagan (IMR)
12th	1944	William Davin (Lab)	Patrick Boland (FF)	Patrick Gorry (FF)	Thomas F. O'Higgins (FG)	Oliver J. Flanagan (IMR)
13th	1948	William Davin (Lab)	Patrick Boland (FF)	Patrick Gorry (FF)	Tom O'Higgins, Jnr (FG)	Oliver J. Flanagan (Ind.)
14th	1951	William Davin (Lab)	Patrick Boland (FF)	Peadar Maher (FF)	Tom O'Higgins, Jnr (FG)	Oliver J. Flanagan (Ind.)
15th	1954	William Davin (Lab)	Nicholas Egan (FF)	Peadar Maher (FF)	Tom O'Higgins, Jnr (FG)	Oliver J. Flanagan (FG)
15th	1956 by-election	Kieran Egan (FF)	Nicholas Egan (FF)	Peadar Maher (FF)	Tom O'Higgins, Jnr (FG)	Oliver J. Flanagan (FG)
16th	1957	Kieran Egan (FF)	Nicholas Egan (FF)	Peadar Maher (FF)	Tom O'Higgins, Jnr (FG)	Oliver J. Flanagan (FG)
17th	1961	Kieran Egan (FF)	Nicholas Egan (FF)	Patrick Lalor (FF)	Tom O'Higgins, Jnr (FG)	Oliver J. Flanagan (FG)
18th	1965	Henry Byrne (Lab)	Nicholas Egan (FF)	Patrick Lalor (FF)	Tom O'Higgins, Jnr (FG)	Oliver J. Flanagan (FG)
19th	1969	Ger Connolly (FF)	Bernard Cowen (FF)	Patrick Lalor (FF)	Tom Enright (FG)	Oliver J. Flanagan (FG)
20th	1973	Ger Connolly (FF)	Charles McDonald (FG)	Patrick Lalor (FF)	Tom Enright (FG)	Oliver J. Flanagan (FG)
21st	1977	Ger Connolly (FF)	Bernard Cowen (FF)	Patrick Lalor (FF)	Tom Enright (FG)	Oliver J. Flanagan (FG)
22nd	1981	Ger Connolly (FF)	Bernard Cowen (FF)	Liam Hyland (FF)	Tom Enright (FG)	Oliver J. Flanagan (FG)
23rd	1982 (Feb)	Ger Connolly (FF)	Bernard Cowen (FF)	Liam Hyland (FF)	Tom Enright (FG)	Oliver J. Flanagan (FG)
24th	1982 (Nov)	Ger Connolly (FF)	Bernard Cowen (FF)	Liam Hyland (FF)	Tom Enright (FG)	Oliver J. Flanagan (FG)
24th	1984 by-election	Ger Connolly (FF)	Brian Cowen (FF)	Liam Hyland (FF)	Tom Enright (FG)	Oliver J. Flanagan (FG)
25th	1987	Ger Connolly (FF)	Brian Cowen (FF)	Liam Hyland (FF)	Tom Enright (FG)	Charles Flanagan (FG)
26th	1989	Ger Connolly (FF)	Brian Cowen (FF)	Liam Hyland (FF)	Tom Enright (FG)	Charles Flanagan (FG)
27th	1992	Ger Connolly (FF)	Brian Cowen (FF)	Liam Hyland (FF)	Pat Gallagher (Lab)	Charles Flanagan (FG)
28th	1997	John Moloney (FF)	Brian Cowen (FF)	Seán Fleming (FF)	Tom Enright (FG)	Charles Flanagan (FG)
29th	2002	John Moloney (FF)	Brian Cowen (FF)	Seán Fleming (FF)	Olwyn Enright (FG)	Tom Parlon (PDs)
30th	2007	John Moloney (FF)	Brian Cowen (FF)	Seán Fleming (FF)	Olwyn Enright (FG)	Charles Flanagan (FG)
31st	2011	Brian Stanley (SF)	Barry Cowen (FF)	Seán Fleming (FF)	Marcella Corcoran Kennedy (FG)	Charles Flanagan (FG)
32nd	2016	Constituency abolished. See Laois and Offaly.				
33rd	2020	Brian Stanley (SF)	Barry Cowen (FF)	Seán Fleming (FF)	Carol Nolan (Ind.)	Charles Flanagan (FG)
33rd	2024	Brian Stanley (SF)	(Vacant)	Seán Fleming (FF)	Carol Nolan (Ind.)	Charles Flanagan (FG)
34th	2024	Constituency abolished. See Laois and Offaly.				
