= Garda Síochána malpractice allegations =

Since 2013, allegations have surfaced that the Garda Síochána (Ireland's national police force) has been involved in malpractice, including allegations that members had inappropriately cancelled driving penalty points, that the offices of the Garda Síochána Ombudsman Commission (GSOC) had been bugged, revelations that telephone calls at Garda stations had been recorded for decades, the case of Jerry McGrath (who was convicted of murdering Sylvia Roche-Kelly in Limerick while on bail in 2007) and other allegations of serious Garda misconduct.

Garda Commissioner Martin Callinan resigned on the day news emerged that the potentially illegal phone recording had taken place at Garda stations for decades. He had been under pressure before then to withdraw remarks he had made an Oireactas (Parliamentary) committee that whistleblowers within the force, such as Sergeant Maurice McCabe and John Wilson, were "disgusting".

Minister for Justice, Alan Shatter, resigned after receipt of a report into the handling of Garda whistleblowers by the Department of Justice and the Garda Síochána. A week previous to this, the Data Protection Commissioner found he had illegally revealed Garda information about a political opponent while debating the issue of cancelled penalty points live on national television.

Both men had been embroiled in a controversy at the beginning of 2014 regarding suspected bugging of GSOC.

A commission of investigation was set up into the recording of telephone calls at Garda stations. A report into allegations of misconduct raised by one of the whistleblowers substantially vindicated the whistleblowers position and was critical of the Garda Síochána and the Department of Justice.

A report into the suspected bugging of GSOC was dismissive two of the three anomalies discovered by GSOC. A third anomaly could not be explained but the report did not regard that as proof that bugging took place.

== Timeline ==
=== Handling of Garda whistleblowers ===
In September 2013, a report of the Irish Comptroller and Auditor General said that significant revenue had been lost by the state owing to irregularities in the application of the penalty points system for driving offences. The Garda Commissioner, Martin Callinan, appearing thefore the Public Accounts Committee of the Oireachtas (Irish legislature) on 23 January 2014, said there was no evidence that Gardaí had cancelled penalty points for relatives or friends. Referring to two Whistleblowers, Garda Maurice McCabe and former Garda John Wilson, who had made allegations of widespread corruption with regard to penalty points, Callinan said, "Frankly, on a personal level, I think it’s quite disgusting.” McCabe gave evidence in private to the Public Accounts Committee on 30 January. A Garda Inspectorate report, published on 12 March 2014, said there were "consistent and widespread breaches of policy" in regard to penalty points. Callinan came under increasing pressure to withdraw the "disgusting" remark, and resigned on 25 March 2014.

An Irish Independent journalist, Gemma O'Doherty, took an unfair dismissal claim against the newspaper, claiming she was sacked after visiting Callinan's home as part of her investigation into the penalty points controversy.

Maurice McCabe, in addition to his evidence on penalty points, made allegations of Garda misconduct on a number of other occasions. The government appointed a Senior Counsel, Seán Guerin, to investigate these claims. The Guerin Report, published on 9 May 2014, said that nine of the ten cases reported by McCabe merited investigation by a commission of enquiry.

=== Allegations of GSOC surveillance ===
On 9 February 2014, the Irish edition of The Sunday Times led with a story written by journalist John Mooney. In it he outlined how the Garda Síochána Ombudsman Commission had suspected that it was under surveillance. Mooney explained how GSOC had hired the services of a UK counter-surveillance firm, Verrimus, to investigate.

=== Telephone recordings at Garda stations ===
These were revealed in the wake of Martin Callinan's resignation Tuesday 25 March 2014. The revelation had a major impact on court cases, with the first trial to be affected being that of two men suspected of IRA membership on 26 March. In response to Callinan's resignation, his Deputy Commissioner Noirín O'Sullivan was selected as provisional Garda Commissioner. The Irish government set up a statutory commission of investigation into the practice of recording telephone calls.

=== Cavan-Monaghan allegations ===
Eleven specific allegations of failure and malpractices in the Cavan-Monaghan Division of the Garda Síochána have been identified for investigation by Ireland's Minister for Justice. The most serious of these is to examine how a murderer was let out on bail after committing two other serious assaults.

=== Athlone allegations ===
On 31 March 2015, Mick Wallace TD told the Dáil of “serious Garda malpractice’’ in the Athlone area. In 2012, a garda personally saw Taoiseach Enda Kenny in Castlebar and told him about malpractice "in relation to a certain superintendent". Wallace told the Taoiseach: "Later that same year you gave approval to the promotion of this superintendent to chief superintendent". This same chief superintendent was reported to be the subject of three different investigations.
