= Garda phone recordings scandal =

Surveillance scandal in Ireland

The Garda phone recordings scandal was a political scandal in Ireland resulting from the widespread practice of recording phone calls to and from Garda Síochána police stations from the 1980s to November 2013. The practice was revealed in March 2014.

The scandal unfolded while Fine Gael and the Labour Party were in office, though the time period involved also covered successive governments during which Fianna Fáil, the Green Party and the Progressive Democrats were all in power. Among those implicated in the scandal were the Taoiseach Enda Kenny, justice minister Alan Shatter, Secretary General of the Department of Justice Brian Purcell, Secretary General of the Department of the Taoiseach Martin Fraser, attorney general Máire Whelan, Garda Commissioner Martin Callinan, as well as Independent News & Media.

Multiple commentators invoked the term GUBU (grotesque, unbelievable, bizarre and unprecedented) to describe the Garda phone recordings controversy. GUBU is an acronym particular to Hiberno-English, denoting superlative infamy and drawing comparisons to the original GUBU scandal. Shane Phelan, Public Affairs Editor at the Irish Independent commented "it is now safe to say we have finally reached GUBU territory", while Michael Clifford of the Irish Examiner observed "More than 30 years after the original GUBU moment, here was another one."

== Background ==
While debating the question of penalty points on state television with independent deputy Mick Wallace in May 2013, justice minister Alan Shatter divulged hitherto publicly unknown personal information to viewers about Wallace in an attempt to undermine his opponent. Shatter later admitted receiving his information from Garda Commissioner Martin Callinan but claimed he was not "in the business of collecting secret files on politicians". Callinan subsequently referred to whistleblowers, such as Maurice McCabe and John Wilson, as "disgusting" at a Public Accounts Committee in 2014 (see also Garda whistleblower scandal).

== Timeline ==
The 2014 revelations of surveillance came on Tuesday 25 March, the same day that Martin Callinan resigned as Garda Commissioner over his remarks. On that day it was revealed that the former commissioner had written to the Department of Justice and Equality about the recordings over two weeks before the revelations. He wrote that he had established a working group to deal with the recordings and that they would report to him once they had consulted the Attorney General. He wrote that he had spoken to the Attorney General and that he expected to talk to the Data Protection Commissioner. He wrote that the Attorney General had advised that the recordings be collected and an inventory be made identifying them by station, date and condition. He also wrote that he had ordered all recording of non-999 calls to Garda stations cease and that this happened on 23 November 2013. He wrote that Minister for Justice and Equality Alan Shatter be informed of details of the recordings.

On 26 March 2014, Taoiseach Enda Kenny informed the Dáil that he had sent Brian Purcell, the Secretary General of the Department of Justice, to Callinan the day before the Garda Commissioner's departure. Fianna Fáil leader Micheál Martin said this meant Kenny had effectively "sacked" Callinan. Kenny also said that he had been personally briefed on Garda surveillance by the Attorney General as the AG did not wish to speak of the matter over the telephone.

== Response ==
It was soon clear the revelation that telephone calls were recorded en masse could have a major impact on court cases. The first trial to be affected was that of two men suspected of IRA membership on 26 March.

In March 2014 the Irish Council for Civil Liberties said: ”For weeks, the ICCL has been calling for the creation of a proper statutory inquiry with the fact-finding powers necessary to restore public trust in the accountability of An Garda Síochána. Instead, the Government has chosen to refer each successive crisis to a different non-judicial mechanism, none of which has been granted the power comprehensively to establish the truth. Today's revelations regarding the recording of calls to and from Garda stations may have grave ramifications for the administration of justice and this is the day when the rot must stop”.

In response to Callinan's resignation, his Deputy Commissioner Noirín O'Sullivan was selected as provisional Garda Commissioner. The government also set up a statutory commission of investigation. The "Commission of Investigation (Certain Matters relative to An Garda Síochána and other persons)" is commonly called the Fennelly Commission, after its sole member, Nial Fennelly, a former Supreme Court justice.

== Locations ==
According to cabinet minister Simon Coveney, 2,400 physical tape recordings exist from before 2008, as well as an unknown number of digital recordings made after this date. Coveney was unable to identify the listeners. Telephone calls at all 26 divisional headquarters of the Garda Síochána were tapped. Garda stations at the following locations were confirmed to have had all calls into and out of them tapped for at least three decades:

- Bray
- Letterkenny
- Waterford

== See also ==
- 2014 GSOC bugging scandal
- Corruption in Ireland
- Death of Sophie Toscan du Plantier
- Global surveillance
- GUBU
