= Kieran Boylan affair =

The Kieran Boylan affair refers to a long-running saga involving the convicted drug dealer Kieran Boylan and his links as a protected informant of the Garda Síochána (Ireland's national police force).

== History ==
Boylan, from County Louth, was the owner of a trucking firm in Ardee and had numerous drugs convictions in England and Ireland. In December 2003, the National Bureau of Criminal Investigation (NBCI) caught him at Dublin Port in possession of heroin and cocaine worth €750,000. He was sentenced to five years imprisonment in December 2005.

On 6 October 2005, while on bail, members of the Garda National Drug Unit (GNDU) caught Boylan in possession of heroin and cocaine worth €1.7 million in the yard of his trucking firm. The case against him was withdrawn twice, the second time in July 2008 when his trial collapsed, leading to reports that the convicted drug dealer had been assisted by gardaí (members of the Garda Síochána).

== Inquiry ==
The publicity around this matter led to the Garda Síochána Ombudsman Commission's widest, longest and costliest inquiry, with the Ombudsman sending the Kieran Boylan file to the Director of Public Prosecutions (DPP) In December 2012. In May 2013, the investigation concluded with no evidence established of any improper conduct by gardaí. It was later revealed that gardaí had disrupted the GSOC's investigation and refused to co-operate with it. In 2014, the GSOC disclosed to the general public that there had been a security alert at their office, an event which, it was later revealed, resulted from a suspicion that gardaí were bugging the office due to the GSOC's investigation into the Kieran Boylan affair. Sinn Féin President Gerry Adams told the Dáil on 19 February 2014 “Today, following a radio interview in which I was asked about the Boylan angle, I was contacted at my Dáil office by a man who said he was the Kieran Boylan in question. He objected strongly to Sinn Féin highlighting this aspect of the bugging scandal.”

In the midst of these events, Garda Commissioner Martin Callinan was granted a further two years in his role by justice minister Alan Shatter, due to last until August 2015. However, on 25 March 2014, Callinan resigned over his remarks about whistleblowers, leaving in his wake the first revelations to the general public of widespread Garda phone recordings of civilians.

== See also ==
- 2014 GSOC bugging scandal
