= 2014 GSOC bugging scandal =

The GSOC bugging scandal in February 2014 involved revelations that the offices of the Garda Síochána Ombudsman Commission, Ireland's independent police watchdog, were under covert electronic surveillance by an unknown party. John Mooney, security correspondent for The Sunday Times, first published the story alleging that GSOC had been the subject of surveillance by an unidentified party using "government level technology" to hack into its emails, Wi-Fi and telephone systems. The espionage operation was uncovered by a private British counter-surveillance firm, Verrimus, whom GSOC hired after its suspicions became aroused of outside spying on the organisation and its activities.

The scandal and its aftermath are widely attributed to be one of the main reasons, along with the Garda whistleblower scandal, for the resignations of the Garda Commissioner Martin Callinan (in March 2014) and the Minister for Justice and Equality and Defence Alan Shatter (in May 2014). GSOC Chairman, Simon O'Brien, resigned from his job in January 2015, ten months after the bugging allegations became public knowledge.

== Discovery of surveillance operation ==
Verrimus, the UK-based private counterintelligence company which uses technical surveillance countermeasures and specialist devices to uncover electronic surveillance, and employs former British military and intelligence personnel, was paid €18,000 by GSOC for its services over a number of days (it came to Dublin during the night to avoid arousing the suspicions of anyone watching GSOC) and found the following;

- A conference speaker phone on the upper floor of the GSOC building on Abbey Street may have been tampered with. This room was regularly used to hold case conferences on sensitive investigations.
- GSOC's internal wireless local area network (WLAN) was compromised in order to steal emails, data, confidential reports and possibly to eavesdrop on mobile phone calls.
- A second Wi-Fi network had been created to harvest GSOC data. It was operated using an IP address in the UK, which concealed the identities and whereabouts of those operating the network.
- Another device, which worked off GSOC's broadband network, was also found to have been compromised. However, it was wiped of all data by those involved in the illicit operation when it became clear that their activities had been detected.
- A UK 4G cellular network was discovered in the vicinity of GSOC's headquarters, claimed to have been operated using an IMSI-catcher (cell tower spoofing) which instead of displaying an Irish Mobile Country Code (MCC) and Mobile Network Code (MNC), displayed a UK country codes – probably by accident, resulting in the only reason why it was found. However, Vodafone were testing the rollout of 4G at the time and it has also been claimed that this is this test network that was detected.

GSOC employed Verrimus after it had consulted with the Independent Police Complaints Commission (IPCC), which is responsible for investigating complaints against police forces in England and Wales.

== Suspected culprits ==
The most likely explanation for the surveillance operation and those that stood most to gain from it and had the experience and access to the technology required were the Garda Síochána, Ireland's national police service. Although no direct evidence was ever found linking the Garda force or its members to the espionage, GSOC investigated many sensitive matters relating to the force including investigations involving senior members of the force. It was reported that the reason GSOC ordered the bug sweep in the first place was because after a meeting with a senior Garda officer during the course of a malpractice investigation by the watchdog, the senior Garda inadvertently let slip that he was aware of contents of a secret report which GSOC had been working on, which had not yet been released, and that he was aware of text that actually never made it into the final report. Units of the force which have the ability to carry out such high-tech monitoring include the Crime and Security Branch, National Surveillance Unit and Special Detective Unit.

The Irish Defence Forces and Revenue Commissioners are the only other two state agencies in Ireland which have the legal authority to carry out covert surveillance operations. The Irish Army and its Military Intelligence and Communications & Information Services Corps have the ability to undertake sophisticated intelligence operations, but no evidence whatsoever was proffered implicating either the military or Revenue, nor would they have stood much to gain from any information gathered.

The United Kingdom's GCHQ and other intelligence services in the past have collected information concerning actions taken by the Irish government, and a second unauthorised spoofing Wi-Fi network discovered at GSOC's head office was traced back to the UK, however it is believed that was a deliberate act to hide the culprit's tracks.

The Sunday Times reported that the NSA in the United States had in the past used very similar technology to spy on targets, and in the aftermath of the Edward Snowden leaks the year before, suspicion was rife about NSA activities in Europe. However, the US had little to gain by surveilling an Irish police watchdog's investigations into corruption and malpractice, and none of GSOC's current investigations involved either the UK or US.

=== Motives ===
According to journalist John Mooney, he linked the bugging operation to GSOC's investigation of the Garda handling of the Kieran Boylan case, a convicted drug-runner who was assisted by Gardaí in obtaining a passport, a haulage licence and had a prosecution for drug offences annulled in extraordinary circumstances. After the results of the security sweep, GSOC did not bring them to the attention of the Minister for Justice or the Garda Síochána (who would usually investigate such matters), instead they emerged through the media.

== Aftermath and resignations ==
This was the second such security sweep GSOC had undertaken, and it was also understood to be concerned about the level of detail emerging publicly regarding ongoing cases. Electronic security procedures were improved after the sweep, including a conference room which cannot be bugged.

The government appointed retired High Court Judge John Cooke to conduct an independent inquiry into reports of unlawful surveillance of the Garda Siochána Ombudsman Commission. He could find neither conclusive evidence supporting the surveillance allegations, or by whom, or that it didn't occur in the first place. Judge Cooke was the only person to undertake the inquiry, which did not include any technical expertise as had been called for by opposition parties.

A number of weeks after news of the bugging at GSOC broke, on 25 March 2014, Garda Commissioner Martin Callinan resigned citing "early retirement" after it was believed the government lost confidence in his leadership and wanted a fresh face to head the force.

Minister for Justice and Defence Alan Shatter, who had a very close working relationship with Commissioner Callinan, resigned from government on 7 May 2014 and later lost his seat as a TD in Dáil Éireann at the 2016 general election. Questions had been raised about the unusual and potentially conflicting occurrence of a Minister holding not only both the Justice and Defence portfolios (housing the two main intelligence services of the state), but also in charge of both the Gardaí and the watchdog whose sole responsibility it is to investigate them.

Chairman of the Garda Síochána Ombudsman Commission, Simon O'Brien, announced his resignation on 7 January 2015 with two years remaining on his contract to take up a role as chief executive of the Pensions Ombudsman Service in the UK. Both the Association of Garda Sergeants and Inspectors (AGSI) and the Garda Representative Association (GRA) had previously called on him to step down over his handling of the bugging scandal, despite being the victim of it.

== See also ==
- Kieran Boylan affair
- Garda whistleblower scandal
- Garda phone recordings scandal
- Irish phone tapping scandal
