= Peter Charleton =

Irish judge

The Hon. Mr. Justice Peter Charleton

Judge of the Supreme Court of Ireland
- In office 14 July 2014 – 11 April 2026
- Nominated by: Government of Ireland
- Appointed by: Michael D. Higgins

Judge of the High Court
- In office 13 April 2006 – 14 July 2014
- Nominated by: Government of Ireland
- Appointed by: Mary McAleese

Personal details
- Born: 11 April 1956 (age 70) Churchtown, Dublin, Ireland
- Spouse: Fiona Charleton (m. 1988)
- Children: 3
- Education: Trinity College Dublin; King's Inns

Peter Mitchel Andrew Charleton (born 11 April 1956) is an Irish lawyer who served as a Judge of the Supreme Court of Ireland from June 2014 to April 2026. He previously served as a Judge of the High Court from 2006 to 2014.

== Early life ==
He was educated at St Mary's College, Dublin, Trinity College Dublin and King's Inns. He was the Auditor of the College Historical Society between 1977 and 1978. His immediate predecessor was Mary Harney. He was in the final of the Irish Times Debate in 1977 and won the Benchers' Trophy for legal debate with Alex Schuster in 1979. As auditor of the CHS, his inaugural address was on the subject of "Republicanism Reviewed" and featured contributions from Conor Cruise O'Brien, John A. Murphy, Bernadette Devlin McAliskey, Mairéad Corrigan, Noël Browne and John Brooke, 2nd Viscount Brookeborough.

== Legal career ==
He was called to the Bar in 1979, and became a senior counsel in 1995. He was the first senior counsel to appear in an Irish court without a wig, following the enactment of the Courts and Court Officers Act 1995. He was appointed to the Advisory Group on Criminal Law and Procedure in 1996 by Minister for Justice Nora Owen.

His legal practice included appearing for the Director of Public Prosecutions in criminal trials. He was prosecuting counsel in cases against Catherine Nevin for murder, and Paul Ward and John Gilligan in the Special Criminal Court for the murder of Veronica Guerin. Charleton also represented clients as a criminal defence barrister and in family law, judicial review and commercial law cases. He represented Christy Burke in a defamation action in 1996 and Eircom in a case related to the publication of a phone sex line in their telephone directory. He defended Ritchie Neville and Jason "J" Brown of the boyband 5ive following charges arising out of an altercation in Temple Bar, Dublin in 2001.

Following the Omagh Bombing on 15 August 1998, Charleton led the prosecution in the Special Criminal Court, leading to the only conviction in Ireland or Northern Ireland in connection with the bombing in 2002. Colm Murphy was sentenced to 14 years for conspiring to cause the bombing. Murphy's conviction was overturned by the Appeal Court in 2005, on the grounds that it was unsafe on two counts, and a retrial was ordered. On the retrial, with witnesses absent, a not guilty verdict was entered

He worked as senior counsel for the Morris Tribunal into allegations of corruption in Donegal and other divisions of the Garda Síochána. He was joined by Paul McDermott SC and Anthony Barr. He left the Morris Tribunal two years before it finished to take up an appointment to the High Court.

Judge Charleton has also represented the State in cases before the European Court of Justice.

He is the author of a number books on criminal law and has also published on family and constitutional law, copyright, extradition and judicial review. His book on the nature of evil came out in 2006, Lies in a Mirror. He lectured in the King's Inns in the law of tort between 1982 and 1984, Trinity College Dublin in criminal law between 1986 and 1988, Fordham University, The University of Washington, and China University of Political Science and Law. He is also an adjunct professor of criminal law and criminology at University of Galway and regularly delivers lectures there.

He was Chairman of the National Archives of Ireland Advisory Council from 2011 to 2016, an unpaid position.

== Judicial career ==
=== High Court ===
He was appointed as a Judge of the High Court in December 2006, and assigned to the Commercial Court from 2010. In 2014 he criticised a firm of stockbrokers for taking risks with the personal fortune of a person with special needs. As a judge of the Central Criminal Court, in a case called The People (DPP) v WD he introduced sentencing bands for rape cases and followed this up with supervision of the Judicial Researchers Office to produce sentencing guidelines for a range of serious indictable crime. Sentencing guidelines are now a feature of Irish law. Other cases of note include James Elliot Construction Ltd v Irish Asphalt Ltd and Others [2011] IEHC 338, where, after a lengthy trial on liability for a building’s ruination, the plaintiff was granted €1,000,000.00 on account of damages and €500,000.00 towards costs, and Weston Ltd v An Bord Pleanála [2010] IEHC 255, where it was held that An Bord Pleanála lawfully refused planning permission for six new hangars at Weston Executive Airport, affirming that preventing intensification of use is a core principle of sustainable planning in line with global norms on controlling airport expansion in sensitive greenbelt zones. In the realm of intellectual property law, Charleton also had to decide in the case of Ivax v Glaxo 2008 No. 3PAP on whether combining two known asthma drugs, salmeterol and fluticasone, into a single inhaler involved an inventive step or was an obvious development, and thus whether Glaxo’s patent for Seretide was valid, finding that ultimately it was not as the subject matter of the patent was not patentable.

Charleton was also the first judge from the common law tradition to impose graduated restrictions on internet copyright violations.

He has also acted as an ad hoc judge of the European Court of Human Rights.

=== Supreme Court ===
He was nominated to the Supreme Court in June 2014 and appointed by President Michael D. Higgins in July 2014.

Charleton has written judgments for the Supreme Court on key aspects of criminal law. In 2016, he outlined the nature of consent in law in the context of sexual offences. He developed the substance of Irish common law defences of duress and provocation in the Gleeson and McNamara cases respectively, in both instances deploying tests using mixed standards of objective and subjective elements. Charleton has also written a number of other judgments such as Island Ferries Teoranta v Minister for Communications, Marine and Natural Resources & Ors [2015] IESC 95, which held that harbour charges must stay within the limits of delegated legislative power, striking down arbitrary State-imposed fees at Ros a’ Mhíl while upholding more modest, socially justified charges at Cill Rónáin, emphasising fair pricing and the need to avoid exploiting consumers or distorting competition through unfair pricing or exclusionary practices.

In the area of tort law, Charleton delivered a judgment in Cromane Seafoods Ltd v Minister for Agriculture [2016] IESC 6 where it was held that the Minister was not liable in negligence or for breach of legitimate expectation by closing Castlemaine Harbour to comply with EU conservation law, Charleton emphasising in his judgment that liability for closing Castlemaine Harbour could not arise without first invalidating the statutory instruments, underscoring the principle that environmental compliance decisions are matters for law and governance. In Bederev v Ireland Ors [2016] IESC 34, Charleton delivered a judgment which upheld the power to add drugs to the Misuse of Drugs Act 1977 schedule, ruling that this was a constitutionally valid delegation of detail, not law-making, because clear principles and Oireachtas oversight existed. In Gearty v Director of Public Prosecutions & Ors [2024] IESC 45, the Minister’s power to create indictable offences by regulation to enforce EU habitat directives was upheld, with Charleton J stressing that such delegation is valid when narrowly bounded and necessitated by European law, reflecting a wider trend of states using strong criminal sanctions to meet biodiversity and climate obligations.

In the area of competition law, Charleton delivered a judgment in CRH Plc, Irish Cement & Ors v The Competition and Consumer Protection Commission [2017] IESC 34, where it was held that under section 37 of the Competition and Consumer Protection Act 2014, investigators may lawfully copy and remove digital records for off-site forensic examination, rejecting arguments that scrutiny must occur on-site. He emphasised that retention and later analysis are inherent in statutory powers to seize and copy, provided privacy rights under Article 8 ECHR are respected through proportionate safeguards. The judgment outlined practical measures, such as keyword searches, destruction of irrelevant material, and possible attendance by representatives, to balance effective enforcement of competition law with constitutional and Convention rights, but that these are limited to competition law and do not apply in, for instance, criminal investigations.

Judgment was delivered by Charleton in Sweeney v Ireland [2019] IESC 39 Charleton, writing for the Court, upheld the constitutionality of disclosure obligations under section 9 of the Offences Against the State (Amendment) Act 1998 ruling that the provision was sufficiently certain, requiring witnesses, not suspects, to disclose information about serious offences that could assist a prosecution, thus not infringing the right to silence or the privilege against self-incrimination as the duty does not apply to those who would incriminate themselves, and the “reasonable excuse” exemption covers such situations. A further judgment regarding the right to silence was delivered by Charleton J in Poptoshev v Ireland & Ors [2025] IESC 47, where Charleton, writing for the Court, upheld the constitutionality of compelling suspects to provide passwords under judicial warrant, provided what is revealed by a suspect, under compulsion of prosecution, is excluded at any criminal trial for the offence under investigation ruling that such measures. This limit on the right to silence was held to be proportionate, and necessary for investigations and lawful digital searches.

In Braney v Special Criminal Court [2021] IESC 7, Charleton, writing for the Court, upheld extended detention under the Offences Against the State Act 1939 as constitutional, affirming that differentiated safeguards for terrorism offences are lawful and necessary to balance security with fundamental rights, and that in any case of detention, a member of An Garda Síochána must form a reasonable suspicion that a person is guilty of an arrestable offence.

In the aftermath of the pandemic, a constitutional issue arose in Burke v The Minister for Education [2022] IESC 1, in which Charleton delivered a judgment, holding that excluding home-schooled students from pandemic-era calculated grades unlawfully interfered with constitutional rights, highlighting that the Government’s postponement of the Leaving Certificate was a valid exercise of executive power, but the CGEO’s refusal to award calculated grades was an unconstitutional administrative act that breached students’ rights by denying them access to third-level education.

In relation to intellectual property law, a reference to the Court of Justice of the European Union was written by Charleton in Merck Sharp & Dohme Ltd v Clonmel Healthcare Ltd [2022] IESC 11 in relation to the interpretation of Regulation (EC) No 469/2009 on supplementary protection certificates (SPCs) for medicinal products, arising from an appeal by Merck Sharp & Dohme regarding the validity of an SPC for its cholesterol-lowering combination product, Inegy, under Articles 3(a) and 3(c) of the Regulation. With Charleton writing for the Court, the reference was made having regard to the fact that the matter was not acte clair, as there was still uncertainty as to whether multiple SPCs may be granted for products covered by a single patent, particularly where claims include both a novel active ingredient and combinations with known substances.

The issue of police powers and search warrants were also considered by Charleton in The People (DPP) v Quirke [2023] IESC 5, where Charleton held that, while Gardaí could seize a computer during a lawful search, they could not examine its digital contents without judicial authorisation, outlining that computers hold vast personal data and raise heightened privacy concerns, requiring investigators to inform the District Court when seeking access to the “virtual space” of a device.

In Delaney v Personal Injuries Assessment Board [2024] IESC 10, it was held by Charleton that judicially drafted personal injury guidelines are constitutional once ratified by the Oireachtas, affirming that structured guidance to promote consistency in damages aligns with rule-of-law principles seen internationally.

Regarding the area of possession and inferences in criminal law, the judgment of DPP v DT [2025] IESC 25 delivered by Charleton it was held that a joint enterprise to possess drugs may be established where the surrounding circumstances indicate that the accused was knowingly involved in the control of contraband, and that such involvement may arise through practical assistance or active encouragement of the enterprise. It was further held that in determining whether the accused was engaged in a joint enterprise, a jury may draw support from the failure of the accused to provide an explanation, when required under statute, for their presence at a location where drugs were discovered. Regarding joint enterprise, Charleton also delivered judgment in The People (DPP) v MB [2024] IESC 33, where it was held that under the doctrine of common design, sustained participation in a brutal pattern of assaults made the accused liable for co‑actor’s escalation, underscoring the principle that recklessness and shared intent can ground criminal responsibility.

A number of notable dissents have also been written by Charleton, including those in Dwyer v Commissioner of An Garda Síochána [2020] IESC 4, Zalewski v Adjudication Office & Ors [2021] IESC 24, Heneghan v the Minister for Housing & Ors [2023] IESC 7, Costello v The Government of Ireland & Ors [2022] IESC 44, and McCool v Honeywell Control Systems Ltd [2024] IESC 5.

In September 2023, Charleton also took up the role of Director of Judicial Studies for the Irish courts, which involves delivering education in the three key areas of black letter law, judge-craft, and appreciation of the changed nature of Irish society.

He retired from the Supreme Court in April 2026 having reached the statutory retirement age of 70 for judges in Ireland.

On 19 June he was awarded a higher doctorate in law by Trinity College Dublin on the basis of his published work.

=== Disclosures Tribunal ===
In 2017, he was appointed sole member of the Disclosures Tribunal investigation into allegations of Garda Síochána malpractice. He published two substantive reports as chair of the Tribunal.

The portion of the inquiry presided over by Charleton ran from February 2017 until October 2018. In his findings from the inquiry, he found that a Garda sergeant, Maurice McCabe, had been subject to a smear campaign by the Garda Commissioner Martin Callinan and a Garda press officer, but not from subsequent Commissioner Nóirín O'Sullivan and other Gardaí. He was also critical of the Child and Family Agency in handling claims of rape.

In his concluding remarks on his findings, he criticised the Gardaí and the Child and Family Agency for not having organisational mentalities of learning from their errors. He was particularly critical of the credibility of evidence given by several senior members of the police force. Drew Harris, O'Sullivan's successor as commissioner, said on its publication that the report was "difficult reading for the organisation" and the Gardaí would move to have "an open and inclusive culture".

Subsequently, he criticised the manner in which tribunals of inquiry are conducted in Ireland. He suggested that instead of being run in a format akin to criminal trials, the main aspect of the inquiry should be directed from the tribunal itself. He later co-authored a journal article about his proposals for change.

== Personal life ==
He is married and has three children. He was a founder-member of the National Symphony Chorus RTÉ Philharmonic Choir and a member of the board of the Irish Baroque Orchestra. Peter Charleton also promoted concerts in Dublin and in London and was particularly associated with the great Chinese musician Fou Ts'ong, some of whose concerts for him were recorded and later released on CD.

== Publications ==
- Charleton, Peter (October 1980). "Improperly Obtained Evidence and the Constitution". Law Society Gazette.
- Charleton, Peter (1982). "Family Law - Mareva Injuntions". DULJ. 4 (95).
- Charleton, Peter. "The Powers of the Police: A Critical Overview". Law Society of Ireland Gazette. 1982.
- Charleton, Peter (May 1982). "An Outline of Extradition Law". Law Society of Ireland Gazette: 161.
- Charleton, Peter (1983). "The Scope of the Remedy of the Barring Order". Irish Law Times.
- Charleton, Peter (1982). "Family Law - Mareva Injuntions". DULJ. 4 (95).
- Charleton, Peter (1984). "Criminal law - Protecting the mentally subnormal against sexual exploitation". DULJ. 6 (165).
- Charleton, Peter (1985). "The Scope of the Doctrine of Common Design". Irish Law Times.
- Charleton, Peter (1986). Controlled Drugs and the Criminal Law. Dublin: An Cló Liúir. ISBN 0951103709.
- Charleton, Peter (1989). "Extradition from Ireland to the United Kingdom". Journal of Criminal Law. 53 (2): 235. doi:10.1177/002201838905300207. S2CID 149386648.
- Charleton, Peter (1990). "The Victim in Irish Constitutional Law: A New Departure". Irish Law Times. 8: 140–143.
- Charleton, Peter (1991). "Causation in the Law of Homicide". Irish Criminal Law Journal. 1 (1): 68–85.
- Charleton, Peter (1992). Offences Against the Person. Blackrock, Co. Dublin: Round Hall Press. ISBN 9780947686857.
- Charleton, Peter (December 1992). "Judicial Discretion in Abortion: The Irish Perspective". International Journal of Law, Policy and the Family. 6 (3): 349–380. doi:10.1093/lawfam/6.3.349.
- Charleton, Peter (1992). Criminal law: Cases & Materials. Dublin: Butterworth Ireland. ISBN 9781854751690.
- Charleton, Peter (1995). "Drugs and Crime - Making the Connection: A Discussion Paper". Irish Criminal Law Journal. 5 (2): 220–240.
- Charleton, Peter; Bolger, Marguerite (January–February 1995). "The Law at Life's End". Law Society of Ireland Gazette. 29 (29, Part 2): 29–77.
- Charleton, Peter; Bolger, Marguerite (1998). "The Competition (Amendment) Act, 1996: Extending the Criminal Law". The Bar Review. 3 (5).
- Charleton, Peter; McDermott, Paul Anthony (1998). "Drugs: The Judicial Response". The Bar Review. 3 (7).
- Charleton, Peter; McDermott, Paul Anthony; Bolger, Marguerite (1999). Criminal law. Dublin: Butterworths. ISBN 9781854758453.
- Charleton, Peter; McDermott, Paul Anthony (2000). "Constitutional Implications of Plea Bargaining". The Bar Review. 5 (9).
- Charleton, Peter; McDermott, Paul Anthony (2000). "From Diplock Courts to Jury Courts". The Bar Review. 8: 99–135.
- Charleton, Peter; McDermott, Paul Anthony (2000). "The Illegal Immigrants Trafficking Act 2000". The Bar Review. 6 (3): 170.
- Charleton, Peter (2000). "Fou Ts'ong: L'Incroyable Histoire d'Un Talent Venu d'Extrême-Orient". Piano: Le Magazine. 14: 17–23.
- Charleton, Peter; McDermott, Paul Anthony (2001). "Constitutional Aspects of Non-Jury Courts". The Bar Review. 6 (3): 141–148.
- Charleton, Peter (2006). Lies in a Mirror: An Essay on Evil and Deceit. Blackhall Publishing Ltd. ISBN 9781842181010.
- Charleton, Peter (2009). "Employment injunctions: an over-loose discretion". Irish Judicial Studies Journal. 2: 1–25. Archived from the original on 7 May 2021.
- Charleton, Peter (2009). "Some Thought for New Entrants to the Law Library". The Bar Review. 14 (5): 90–92.
- Charleton, Peter; Byrne, Stephen (2010). "Sexual Violence: Witnesses and Suspects - a Debating Document". Irish Journal of Legal Studies. 1 (1): 1–83.
- Charleton, Peter; Kelly, Sinéad (2013). "Marriage and the Family: A Changing Institution?". The Bar Review. 16 (5–6): 103.
- Charleton, Peter; Scott, Lisa (2013). "Throw Away the Key: Public and Judicial Approaches to Sentencing - Towards Reconciliation" (PDF). Irish Probation Journal. 10: 7–36.
- Charleton, Peter; Kelly, Sinéad (2013). "The Oracle Speaks Case C128/11". The Bar Review. 18 (3): 33–44.
- Charleton, Peter; Reilly, Sinéad (2015). "Passing Off: An Uncertain Remedy" (PDF). Fordham Intellectual Property Conference. Archived (PDF) from the original on 1 May 2021.
- Charleton, Peter; Molloy, Saoirse (2015). "Case Management: Fairness for the Litigants, Justice for the Parties". The Bar Review. 20 (3): 59–64.
- Charleton, Peter; Cox, Angelina (February 2016). "Accepting the Judgments of the Court of Justice of the EU as Authoritative: The Supreme Court of Ireland, the European Stability Mechanism and the Importance of Legal Certainty". Maastricht Journal of European and Comparative Law. 23 (1): 204–215. doi:10.1177/1023263X1602300113. S2CID 157440882.
- Charleton, Peter; Pratt-O'Brien, Ross; Libreri, Emma (2017). "Blasphemy: religion challenges freedom of speech". Irish Judicial Studies Journal. 1: 15–30. Archived from the original on 24 January 2021.
- Charleton, Peter; Kelly, Sinéad (2017). "Passing Off: A Flexible Safety Net for the Traders". 20 Years of the Boards of Appeal at EUIPO: 136.
- Charleton, Peter; Herlihy, Ciara (2018). "The impact of the digital age on law". Irish Judicial Studies Journal. 2 (1): 50–66. Archived from the original on 24 January 2021.
- Charleton, Peter; Herlihy, Ciara (2018). "L'Impacte de l'Age Numérique sur le Droit". Irish Judicial Studies Journal. 2 (1): 55–72. Archived from the original on 14 May 2021.
- Charleton, Peter; Herlihy, Ciara (2019). "Truth To Be Told: Understanding Truth In The Age Of Post-Truth Politics". Irish Judicial Studies Journal. 01 2019: 1–18. Archived from the original on 15 June 2021.
- Charleton, Peter; Herlihy, Ciara; Carey, Paul (2019). "Clocha Ceangailte agus Madraí Scaoilte or How Tribunals of Inquiry Ran Away from Us". Dublin University Law Journal. 41 (2).
- Charleton, Peter; Charleton, Clara; Laurent, Quentin (2019). "Patents granted to computer systems?". Dublin University Law Journal. 42 (1): 209–220. Archived from the original on 1 March 2021.
- Charleton, Peter; Daly, Conor (2020). "Truth, Patriotism and the Heroic Narrative: The Case of Operation Anthropoid" (PDF). Irish Judicial Studies Journal. 4 (1): 121–141. Archived (PDF) from the original on 24 January 2021.
- Charleton, Peter (2020). "Carl Jung, Father Victor White and the Book of Job" (PDF). Irish Judicial Studies Journal: 134–147. Archived (PDF) from the original on 24 January 2021.
- Charleton, Peter; McDermott, Paul Anthony; Herlihy, Ciara; Byrne, Stephen (2020). Charleton & McDermott's Criminal law and evidence (Second ed.). Bloomsbury Professional. ISBN 9781845922313.
- Charleton, Peter; Cross, Orlaith (2021). "Towards a Presumption of Victimhood: Possibilities for Rebalancing the Criminal Process". Irish Judicial Studies Journal: 1–25.
- Charleton, Peter; Cross, Orlaith (2022). "Special Protection Certificates: Extending patent protection in the EU by administrative action: or is it something more?". Fordham University 29th Annual IP Conference.
- Charleton, Peter (2022). "Cuban Missiles: A Warning on the Uncertainty of War". Irish Judicial Studies Journal: 91–113.
- Charleton, Peter; Rakhmanin, Ivan (2023). "The Safe Use of Expert Evidence". Irish Judicial Studies Journal. 1: 52–69.
- Charleton, Peter; Lochrin, Liam (2023). "The Mysteries of the Common Law". Irish Judicial Studies Journal. 2: 45–62.
- Charleton, Peter; Lochrin, Liam (2023). "Les Mystères de la Common Law et Les Émotions des Juges". Irish Judicial Studies Journal. 2: 63–82.
- Charleton, Peter (2023). "The Assassination of Reinhard Heydrich". IARMHÍ. 1 (3) (2023-2024 ed.): 82–91.
- Charleton, Peter; O'Connor, Victoria (2024). "Try Something Else: Contempt and Confusion". Irish Judicial Studies Journal. 1: 44.
- Charleton, Peter; Rakhmanin, Ivan (2024). "Expert evidence: dangers and the enhancement of reasoning". BJPsych Advances. 30 (6): 338–345. doi:10.1192/bja.2024.18.
- Charleton, Peter, O'Connor, Victoria (2025). "EU Data Nullification: confusion and the rule of law" (PDF). Cambridge Law Journal. 84 (2) – via Cambridge University Press.
- Charleton, Peter, Grosariu, Alessandra (2026). "From "specified in the claims" to "ascertaining the patent's technical contribution" in SPC eligibility: challenging the patent bargain and the effects on pharmaceutical innovation". [Intellectual Property Quarterly] (2): 81–108 – via Westlaw.
- Charleton, Peter (2026). "Discipline and Focus in the Art of Judging" (PDF). Irish Judicial Studies Journal. 10 (1): 32–48.
- Charleton, Peter (2026). Maha, Alatawi, Jordan, Eamonn (ed.). Representations of Justice in Modern and Contemporary Literature, Film and Theatre [Cuchulainn Goes to Hollywood: the Hero as Agent/Bringer of Justice, Foe of Evil]. Peterlang. pp. 151–171. ISBN 9781803741529.
