= Anthony Barr =

Anthony Barr or Tony Barr may refer to:

- Anthony Barr (American football) (born 1992), American linebacker
- Anthony James Barr (born 1940), American programming language designer, software engineer, and inventor
- Anthony Barr (judge) (born 1961), Irish judge
- Tony Barr (Pennsylvania politician)
