= Fennelly Commission =

The Fennelly commission, formally the Commission of Investigation (Certain Matters relative to An Garda Síochána and other persons), was a commission of investigation established in April 2014 by the then government of Ireland to investigate several controversies involving the Garda Síochána. The sole member of the commission was Nial Fennelly, a retired justice of the Supreme Court. Fennelly identified three separate strands within the commission's terms of reference:

1. Garda phone recordings scandal: unauthorised recordings made since the 1980s of conversations to and from some Garda stations (other than 999 emergency telephone number calls, recorded as a matter of course).
2. Death of Sophie Toscan du Plantier: evidence from phone recordings at Bandon Garda station of misconduct in the investigation
3. Martin Callinan: circumstances of his retirement as Garda Commissioner in March 2014.

== Interim report: Callinan ==
In November 2014, the Government requested Fennelly to investigate the Martin Callinan issue first and issue an interim report on it before dealing with the other two issues. Callinan's leaving office was described at the time, by himself and the government, as a decision to retire; however, it was described by the media as a resignation, and the opposition accused Taoiseach Enda Kenny of having effectively sacked Callinan. The requested interim report was issued in September 2015. Kenny asserted that it vindicated his view of the events, but Fianna Fáil and Sinn Féin claimed the opposite and promised to raise motions of no confidence in the Taoiseach when Dáil Éireann resumed after the summer recess.

== Final report ==
The final report was submitted on 31 March 2017 and published on 6 April.

The report found that senior gardaí had "almost total ignorance" of the fact that phone calls were being recorded. It found no evidence that recordings were being used "improperly or unlawfully", while noting that the mere fact of being recorded was itself illegal, and that absence of evidence is not proof of non-existence. The commission did not address one term of reference, namely allegations of recording phone conversations between solicitors and prisoners (in the custody of the Irish Prison Service rather than the Garda Síochána). This was because the commission required an initial report from the Inspector of Prisons, Michael Reilly, incomplete at his death in November 2016.

The report noted that Gardaí investigating the Toscan du Plantier murder had discussed the possibility of altering or suppressing evidence, but not that they had actually done so. It found that they had disclosed confidential negative information about Ian Bailey, their chief suspect, to journalists, locals, and officials.
