= Irish phone tapping scandal =

Surveillance scandal in Ireland

On 18 December 1982, Irish Times security correspondent Peter Murtagh broke the news that the telephone of Bruce Arnold and Geraldine Kennedy had been tapped officially with warrants signed by former Minister for Justice Seán Doherty. This was revealed after the November 1982 elections which the outgoing government had lost.

Incoming Minister for Justice Michael Noonan ordered an investigation and on 20 January 1983 announced findings that the previous Fianna Fáil government had authorised illegal phone tapping of the journalists Geraldine Kennedy, Bruce Arnold and Vincent Browne. Seán Doherty signed warrants for the taps while Minister for Justice. Normally phone tapping was used to investigate serious crime or threats to the security of the state but the reverse happened in this case, Minister Noonan announced.

== History ==
=== Tapping ===
The phone tapping warrants were initiated by Séan Doherty in discussion with Deputy Garda Commissioner Joseph Ainsworth.

The phone of Bruce Arnold was tapped from 10 May 1982 to 12 July the same year. The application was stated to be for security purposes, with a departmental record claiming he was "anti-national".

The phone of Geraldine Kennedy was tapped from 28 July 1982 to 16 November that year with a renewal on 27 October on the grounds that it was "yielding results". For the tap on Kennedys' phone a new category of "national security" was created for the warrant.

Deputy Commissioner Ainsworth requested a complete set of transcripts on 5 October 1982.

=== Senior Garda figures ===
The incoming cabinet met on 18 and 19 January 1983 and an initial draft of a decision expressed loss of confidence in Garda Commissioner Patrick McLaughlin and Deputy Commissioner Thomas Joseph Ainsworth and that they considered removing them from office, though this was removed from the final draft. On 20 January 1983 the cabinet met again and noted the intentions of both Commissioner and Deputy Commissioner to retire.

=== Findings by Deputy Commissioner Wren ===
Deputy Garda Commissioner Lawrence Wren found that neither Bruce Arnold or Geraldine Kennedy had been connected with criminal or subversive activities or people involved with same, that the request for the warrants had not come from the Gardaí but from then minister Séan Doherty and that copies of the recordings had been supplied to minister Doherty.

== Resignation of Charles Haughey ==
Nearly a decade after the scandal broke, Seán Doherty announced at a press conference that he had shown transcripts of recordings to Charles Haughey in 1982 while the latter was still Taoiseach. Until the press conference, Doherty had denied this. This led to Haughey's resignation as Taoiseach.

== Settlements ==
Geraldine Kennedy and Bruce Arnold sued and won for the phone tapping and Vincent Browne settled out of court for earlier phone tapping.

== See also ==
- 2014 GSOC bugging scandal
