= John Cooke (judge) =

Irish judge (1944–2022)

Judge of the High Court
- In office 25 November 2008 – 20 December 2013
- Nominated by: Government of Ireland
- Appointed by: Mary McAleese

Judge of the Court of First Instance
- In office 10 January 1996 – 15 September 2008
- Nominated by: Government of Ireland
- Appointed by: European Council

Personal details
- Born: John D. Cooke; 7 May 1944 Dublin, Ireland
- Died: 29 April 2022 (aged 77) Dublin, Ireland
- Spouse(s): Sally Cooke (m. 1978; d. 2022)
- Children: 2
- Education: University College Dublin; King's Inns

John Cooke (7 May 1944 – 29 April 2022) was an Irish judge who served as a Judge of the High Court from 2008 to 2013 and Judge of the Court of First Instance from 1996 to 2008 and the High Court from 2008 to 2013.

== Early career ==
Cooke was born in 1944 to Kathleen and Richard Cooke, a barrister who practiced until he died aged 94. He obtained BCL and LLB degrees from University College Dublin. He became a barrister in 1966 and a senior counsel in 1980. He was also called to the bars of Northern Ireland, England and Wales, and New South Wales.

His case load was predominantly in commercial litigation and EU law, with expertise in competition law. He appeared in cases in the EU courts.

== Judicial career ==
=== Court of First Instance ===
Cooke became a judge of the Court of First Instance in 1996. He succeeded Donal Barrington as the Irish judge on the court. His term was renewed in 2001 and he concluded his term early in September 2008. He was the judge-rapporteur in Microsoft Corp. v. Commission.

=== High Court ===
He was appointed to the High Court in November 2008. He heard numerous cases involving asylum law while serving on the court. He heard cases involving judicial review, competition law, injunctions, and insolvency law. He approved the appointment of two provisional examiners to the QUINN group in March 2010. He presided in hearings related to the bankruptcy of Seán Dunne. His judgment in Lofinmakin v. Minister for Justice was upheld by the Supreme Court of Ireland.

Cooke was appointed to chair the Constituency Commission in 2011, which produced reports to the Oireachtas in 2012 and 2013. The 2012 report recommended reducing the number of members of Dáil Éireann by eight.

He retired in December 2013.

== Later career ==
Cooke chaired an inquiry from June 2014 into allegations of surveillance of the Garda Síochána Ombudsman Commission. His report found no evidence of bugging. He was appointed chair of the Irish Financial Services Appeals Tribunal in 2015, with his term renewed in 2020. He was appointed the sole member of a Commission of Investigation into the sale of loans by the National Asset Management Agency known as Project Eagle. The timeframe to report was extended to June 2022 in March 2022.

He acted for the Irish government in relation to the Ireland v Commission case.

== Personal life ==
He was married to Sally and had two children. He died in April 2022, aged 78.
