= Commission of investigation (Ireland) =

In the Republic of Ireland, a commission of investigation is a statutory commission established under the Commissions of Investigation Act 2004 to investigate a matter of "urgent public concern". A commission of investigation is a less expensive but less powerful alternative to a tribunal of inquiry. Commissions of investigation may take evidence in private, whereas tribunals of inquiry are held in public. In 2017, the Fine Gael-led government planned to have Peter Charleton chair a commission into the Garda whistleblower scandal; opposition demands led it to change this to a tribunal.

The Commission to Inquire into Child Abuse had been established in 2000 by a specific Act of the Oireachtas, with further acts passed subsequently to amend its operation. The Commissions of Investigation Act 2004 was intended to provide a template so that further commissions could be established more simply, by statutory instrument after a resolution by the houses of the Oireachtas.

List of Commissions of investigation established under the Commissions of Investigation Act 2004
| Statutory instrument(s) | Commission | Topic of investigation | Report (external link) |
|---|---|---|---|
| 2005 No.222 | Dublin and Monaghan Bombings | Dublin and Monaghan bombings | MacEntee Report |
| 2006 No.69 | | False confession by Dean Lyons to the 1997 Grangegorman killings | Birmingham Report |
| 2006 No.137 and 2009 No.117 | Child Sexual Abuse | Sexual abuse scandal in the Catholic archdiocese of Dublin | Murphy Report |
| 2007 No.304 | Leas Cross Nursing Home | Leas Cross scandal | O'Donovan Report |
| 2007 No.371 | | Death of Gary Douch in Mountjoy Prison | McMorrow Report |
| 2010 No.454 and 2010 No.590 | Banking Sector | Irish banking crisis: Anglo Irish Bank and Irish Nationwide Building Society | Misjudging Risk: Causes of the Systemic Banking Crisis in Ireland (Nyberg Report) |
| 2014 No.192 | Fennelly Commission | Garda phone recordings scandal; Martin Callinan retirement; Garda investigation of death of Sophie Toscan du Plantier | Interim Report (Callinan retirement) Final Report (other matters) |
| 2014 No.346 | MacLochlainn Commission | Fatal shooting by Garda of Real IRA member Ronan MacLochlainn in 1998. Chaired by Mary Rose Gearty. | MacLochlainn Report |
| 2015 No.38 | Bailieboro Garda District | Misconduct allegations contained in the Guerin Report | O'Higgins Report |
| 2015 No.57 | Mother and Baby Homes Commission | Mother and baby homes and county homes between 1922 and 1998. | Final Report of the Commission of Investigation into Mother and Baby Homes |
| 2015 No.253 | IBRC Commission | Certain matters concerning transactions entered into by Irish Bank Resolution Corporation. | Report on the transaction in relation to Site servPlc and principles and policies within IBRC on interest rates |
| 2017 No.96 | (sole member Marjorie Farrelly) | Abuses at a foster home in the South-East. | Not yet submitted |
| 2025 No.388 | MacGrath Commission | Handling of allegations or concerns of sexual abuse by those in authority across all day and boarding schools in Ireland. | |

== See also ==
- Royal commission, similar body in Commonwealth countries
