= Penalty points in Ireland =

A penalty points system has been in operation in Republic of Ireland law since 2002 for regulatory offences relating to driving on public roads. Penalty points are recorded against the driver's licence, which is suspended if a points maximum is breached within a three-year period. Most penalty-point offences also incur a fine called a fixed-charge penalty, which may be levied at the scene by a Garda Síochána (police) officer, or via the post if, for example, a traffic enforcement camera detected the offence. The scheme has some additional fixed-charge penalty offences which do not accrue any penalty points. More serious driving offences are not included in the penalty-points system but result in automatic driving bans or imprisonment.

After controversy about alleged flaws in the implementation, an Independent Oversight Authority was established in 2015 to make annual reports on its operation.

== Implementation ==
Penalty points lapse after three years; a total of 12 points accrued will trigger a six-month driving ban. For learner drivers and novice drivers, the limit is 7 points. Since December 2014, 62 offences incur points: fixed-charge penalty offences incur 1–3 points, and offences requiring mandatory court appearance incur 3–5 points on conviction.

Offences are detected by the Garda Síochána, or notified to the Garda by a private company operating speed camera vans. Notices are issued through the post by the Road Safety Authority, which also publishes monthly statistics of notices. Points are not recorded on the physical licence document, but on a database maintained by the Department of Transport, Tourism and Sport, which is linked to the Garda's Pulse computer system. The fine is charged at the standard rate if paid within 28 days of the notice being issued, and at a 50% higher rate for the next 28 days. After this, court proceedings are begun. One can also appeal a fixed-charge penalty in court, but if the appeal fails an extra 2 points are incurred and the fine is doubled. The Comptroller and Auditor General's 2013 report found that 71% of fixed charge notice fines were paid within the 56 days; 22% resulted in court proceedings; 5% were terminated; and 2% had "other outcomes". Half of court cases were struck out because the summons had not been properly served, often where the car was registered to a company rather than a private individual, or because of flaws with the registered address. Some judges have struck out cases involving the privately operated speed cameras, blaming gaps in the chain of evidence.

The British–Irish Council and competent authorities in the various Irish and UK jurisdictions are planning to implement mutual recognition of penalty points across both countries. The European Convention on Driving Disqualifications is already implemented for court-order disqualifications.

== History ==
The Road Traffic Act 2002 first provided for penalty points and for fixed-charge penalties, replacing an earlier system of on-the-spot fines. Originally planned for 1998, its introduction was delayed by the need to upgrade and interconnect administrative computer systems, and by opposition from rank-and-file Gardaí fearing an increased workload. The system was introduced at a scaled-back level on 31 October 2002 for speeding offences. Additional offences were included within its scope in subsequent years, with 31 added in 2006. Seven offences listed in the 2002 Act as amended are not yet included in the points system.

In 2004, a loophole came to light when Gardaí were unable to prove a posted penalty notice had been received by the driver. The same year, Gardaí were issued handheld computers to automate reporting of offences. In 2006, problems connecting data meant that Gardaí could report offences but not view drivers' penalty point data or confiscate licences. In 2009, media reported problems where drivers illegally driving with no licence would avoid accruing points. The outsourcing of speed cameras began in November 2010. A loophole, whereby those appealing a penalty were not obliged to bring their driving licence to court, was closed in 2012. In 2015, the government said it would close a similar loophole exploited by 72% of drivers receiving summons to court. In 2013, motor insurance companies were granted access the penalty points database, to encourage lower insurance premiums for careful drivers.

The Department of Transport published a review of the system in June 2012, which was discussed by the Oireachtas joint committee that September. The review influenced the Road Traffic Act 2014, which added 11 new offences to the system, to increase the penalty points for some offences, and to reduce the limit from 12 to 7 points for learner drivers and a new category of novice drivers.

=== Annulment controversy ===
Senior Gardaí have discretionary power to annul penalty points. In September 2012, two Garda whistleblowers alleged that this power had been abused to annul thousands of penalties, favouring some influential people and others later involved in serious traffic accidents. One of the whistleblowers resigned from the Garda in May 2013.

Four technical group TDs raised the matter in the Dáil in December 2012. In March 2013 one of the four, Luke 'Ming' Flanagan admitted he himself had had points annulled. In May, another of the four, Mick Wallace, traded allegations with Alan Shatter, the Minister for Justice, about being spared penalties at Garda discretion.

An internal Garda report on the allegations was published in May 2013. It found that 3 of 113 officers had departed from guidelines, but found no evidence of corruption. The report was referred to the Garda Inspectorate and the Oireachtas for further examination. The technical group TDs were critical of the Garda report for not interviewing the whistleblowers.

The Comptroller and Auditor General's office also received information on the original allegations and conducted a review of the system for its 2012 report. Published in September 2013, it found the rate of termination ranged across different Garda districts between 0.1% and 5.9%. In January 2014, when the Oireachtas Public Accounts Committee reviewed the report, it questioned the Garda commissioner, Martin Callinan, who defended the Gardaí's application of discretion. Callinan's argued that the whistleblowers should have raised their concerns internally, and his testimony controversially used the word "disgusting":

I do respect the notion that gardaí, in certain circumstances, should not be investigating one another. That is why we have the ombudsman commission to deal with those cases. Clearly, here, however, we have two people, out of a force of over 13,000, who are making extraordinary and serious allegations. There is not a whisper anywhere else or from any other member of the Garda Síochána, however, about this corruption, malpractice and other charges levelled against their fellow officers. Frankly, on a personal level I think it is quite disgusting.

The following week the committee interviewed one of the whistleblowers in private, despite opposition from the Commissioner and from Shatter, who referred the allegations to the Garda Síochána Ombudsman Commission.

The Garda Inspectorate's review of the May 2013 report was published on 12 March 2014. The report, which found widespread breaches of policy, recommended setting up a working group to manage the penalty points system, which first met on 13 March 2014. In light of the report, ministers Leo Varadkar and Eamon Gilmore called on Callinan to withdraw the word "disgusting" from his previous testimony; instead of which, he unexpectedly resigned as Commissioner on 25 March 2014.

In 2015, minister Fitzgerald established an Independent Oversight Authority under Matthew Deery, a retired President of the Circuit Court. Deery's first annual report was published in January 2016, finding "substantial compliance" with the processes.

=== Subsequent developments ===
The District Court in common law had discretion to allow those accused of minor offences to make a contribution to the court poor box to avoid a criminal conviction. This power was historically used in relation to road traffic offences until 2014, when the High Court ruled that the introduction of mandatory penalty points had eliminated discretion in relation to applicable offences. Nevertheless, The Irish Times reported in 2025 that some District Court judges were continuing to allow use of the poor box.
