= Mick Wallace =

Irish politician (born 1955)

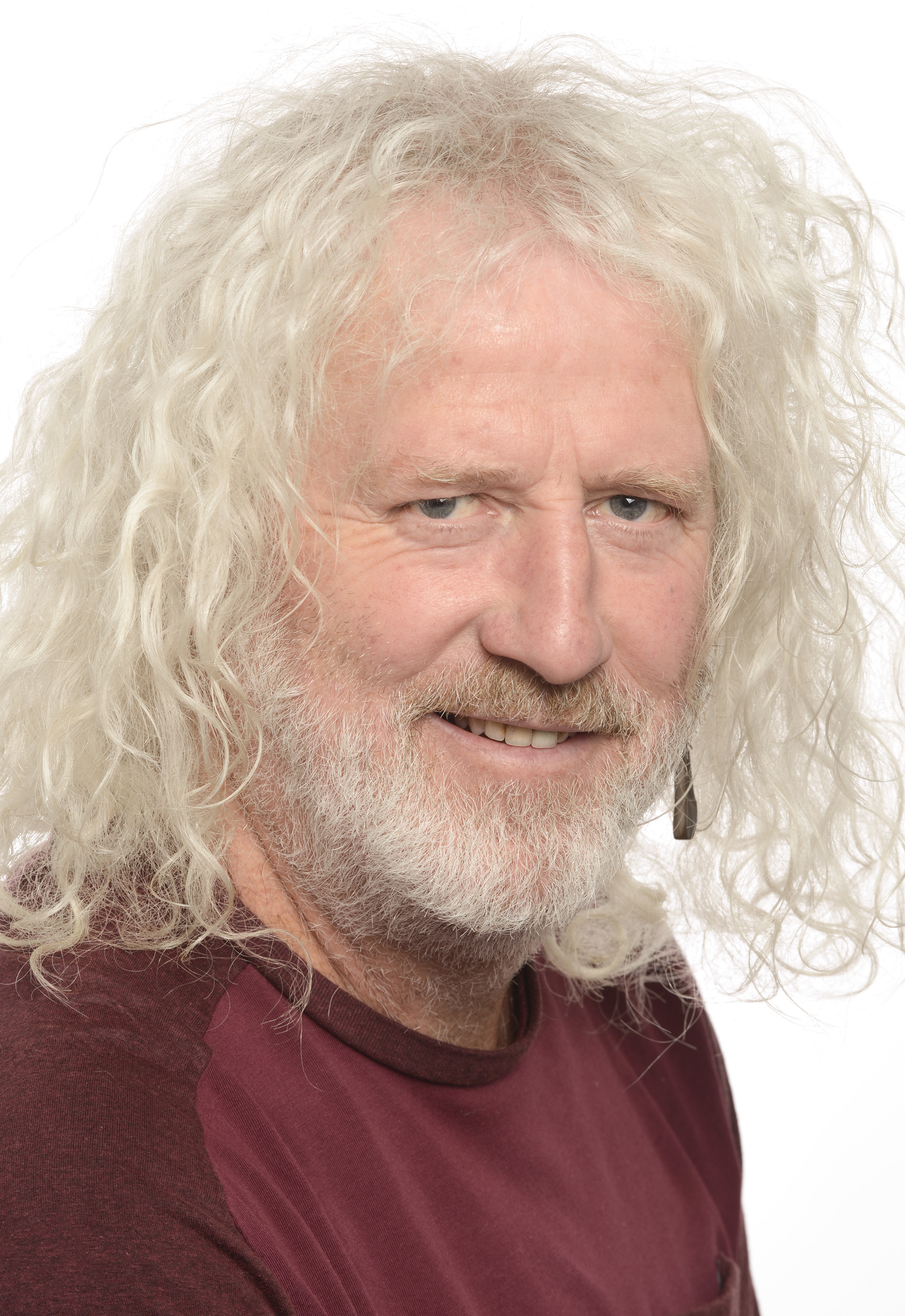
- Wallace in 2019

Member of the European Parliament
- In office 2 July 2019 – 17 July 2024
- Constituency: South

Teachta Dála
- In office February 2011 – July 2019
- Constituency: Wexford

Personal details
- Born: Michael Wallace; 9 November 1955 (age 71) Wexford, Ireland
- Party: Independent (until 2014; 2026–present)
- Other political affiliations: Independents 4 Change (2014–2026); EU: The Left
- Spouse: Mary Murphy (m. 1979; div. 1992)
- Children: 4
- Education: University College Dublin

Michael Wallace (born 9 November 1955) is an Irish politician, former property developer and former Member of the European Parliament (MEP) from Ireland for the South constituency from 2019 to 2024. He was a member of Independents 4 Change, part of The Left in the European Parliament. He was a Teachta Dála (TD) for the Wexford constituency from 2011 to 2019.

Entering politics in 2011 following the post-2008 Irish economic downturn, Wallace was considered one of the most eccentric and unconventional figures in Irish politics. Wallace gained a reputation for anti-establishment and left-wing populist views, and became a frequent guest on the political debate show Tonight with Vincent Browne. In 2012, it emerged that during his time as a property developer, Wallace's company owed €2.1 million to the state in unpaid value-added taxes.

Since 2012, Wallace has had a close political association with Clare Daly. As an MEP, Wallace has gained international attention for his foreign policy positions, describing himself as fighting "anti-Russia" and "anti-China" rhetoric. His views have been the subject of controversy and criticism in Europe, but have been promoted by state-controlled media in Russia, China, Iran, Syria, and other authoritarian states.

== Early and personal life ==
Wallace was born in Wellingtonbridge in County Wexford, Ireland, in 1955. The son of businessman Joseph Wallace and his wife Maureen, he was one of a family of 12 children. His father, a former Fianna Fáil member, was the head of a family that owned and operated several businesses in Wellingtonbridge. He graduated from University College Dublin with a degree in English, history and philosophy, and later obtained a teaching qualification. He married Mary Murphy from Duncormick, County Wexford, in 1979; the couple had two sons, but the marriage ended when the children were young. Wallace had two more children from another relationship in the 1990s.

In 2007, Wallace founded the Wexford Football Club, which he managed for their first three seasons, and was chairman of its board. The club is in the League of Ireland First Division. He is also a supporter of Italian football club Torino.

Prior to entering politics, Wallace owned a property development and construction company completing developments such as The Italian Quarter in the Ormond Quay area of the Dublin quays. The company later collapsed into liquidation, with Wallace finally being declared bankrupt on 19 December 2016.

== Early political career and election as TD (2011–2019) ==
Prior to entering politics, Wallace had expressed his political views publicly. In 2002, Dublin City Council took a case to the High Court to demand Wallace remove a banner saying "No to War. No to Nice. No to American Terrorism". The court ruled in Wallace's favour, allowing him to keep the banner. In 2003, the council forced Wallace to remove another banner opposing the Iraq War from one of his sites.

On 5 February 2011, while a guest on Tonight with Vincent Browne, Wallace made the announcement that he intended to contest the upcoming general election on 25 February as an Independent candidate. Running on the slogan "For a New Politics", he topped the poll in the Wexford constituency with 13,329 votes and was elected on the first count. According to John Dwyer, who stood against him in that election, Wallace's tax affairs were "the talk of the pubs, all of these things were known. Because he was such a rebel, because he was prepared to stick the finger up at the authorities, he got elected."

Shortly after being elected, Wallace was caught by a microphone in Dáil Éireann saying "Miss Piggy has toned it down a bit today", referring to an outfit worn by Mary Mitchell O'Connor. After Mitchell O'Connor described the comments as "really hurtful" to her, he accepted responsibility and later apologised, saying "It was my fault. I passed the reference because of her handbag. I'm completely out of order. I don't have a leg to stand on […] Clearly it was in bad taste." He called Mitchell O'Connor to apologise and said he would write a letter of apology to her as well.

Wallace co-founded the Independents 4 Change, which was registered to stand for elections in March 2014.

During their time in the Dáil, Wallace and Dublin North TD Clare Daly became friends and political allies, and worked together on many campaigns, including opposition to austerity and highlighting revelations of alleged Garda malpractices, including harassment, improper cancellation of penalty points and involvement of officers in the drug trade. Wallace and Daly were partially active in protesting the Garda whistleblower scandal, which eventually caused the resignation of Minister for Justice Frances Fitzgerald, although she was later cleared of wrongdoing by the Charleton Tribunal.

In December 2015, Wallace and independent TDs Clare Daly and Maureen O'Sullivan each put forward offers of a €5,000 surety for a man charged with membership of an unlawful organisation and with possession of a component part of an improvised explosive device.

At the 2016 general election, Wallace stood as an Independents 4 Change candidate and was re-elected, finishing third on the first-preference count with 7,917 votes.

=== Political views during his time in the Dáil ===
Wallace has stated that the welfare of women working in prostitution would be improved if the trade were not pushed underground.

He said he was "a bit flabbergasted" by the introduction of the household charge brought in as part of the 2012 Budget, and by how that party had changed from when it was in opposition. On 15 December 2011, he helped to launch a nationwide campaign against the household charge.

Wallace was criticised and accused of "defending terrorism" by Joan Burton, then Ireland's Tánaiste, for comments he made during the November 2015 Paris attacks. While the attacks were unfolding, Wallace posted on his Twitter account "So terrible for the victims, but when is France going to stop its role in the militarisation of the planet?", sparking an angry reaction on social media.

In 2017, Wallace called on Ireland to join the Boycott, Divestment, Sanctions movement against Israel and "condemn the illegal expansion of Israeli settlements on Palestinian lands as well as the ongoing human rights abuses against Palestinians". Wallace proposed an "official boycott of goods from illegal settlements in the occupied Palestinian territories".

=== Arrest at Shannon Airport ===
In July 2014, Wallace and Daly were arrested at Shannon Airport while trying to board a US military aircraft. Wallace said the airport was being used as a US military base and that the government should be searching the planes to ensure that they are not involved in military operations or that there are no weapons on board. Wallace was fined €2,000 for being in an airside area without permission, and chose not to pay. He was sentenced to 30 days in prison in default, and in December 2015 was arrested for non-payment of the fine. Joan Burton accused Wallace of "putting Irish people at risk" of terrorism by repeatedly linking Shannon Airport to US-led wars "simply for the sake of some media coverage".

== Member of the European Parliament (2019–2024) ==
At the 2019 European Parliament election, he was elected as an MEP for the South constituency, receiving 81,780 (11.4%) of first-preference votes.

Mick Wallace has been criticised for supporting Russia, Belarus, China, Syria, Venezuela and Ecuador during his period as an MEP. In November 2020, Wallace referred to Belarusian opposition presidential candidate Svetlana Tikhanovskaya as a "pawn of western neoliberalism". In February 2021, Wallace was reprimanded for using a swear word during a session of the European Parliament, when he called Venezuelan opposition leader Juan Guaidó an "unelected gobshite". In September 2022, he was one of 19 MEPs who voted against condemning Nicaragua for the arrest of Rolando Álvarez.

During the COVID-19 pandemic, Wallace opposed vaccination passports. He has said "I’m not anti-vax but we're going down a dangerous path with Covid pass" and expressed concerns about civil liberties. Both Wallace and Daly have refused to present vaccination certs upon entering the European Parliament, resulting in them being reprimanded.

In November 2022, Wallace criticised protests in Iran following the death of Mahsa Amini, accusing some protestors of violence and destruction and saying it "would not be tolerated anywhere".

In a speech at the European parliament, Wallace criticised the EU for failing to adequately investigate the blowing up of the Nord Stream pipeline. He referred to Seymour Hersh's conclusion that US navy divers blew up the pipeline and said "has the EU become so subservient, to US empire that yous can’t even ask them if they did it? Yous are a fucking joke".

In the 2024 European Parliament elections, Wallace and Daly were endorsed by actress Susan Sarandon, who said they were "speaking up loud and clear for international solidarity" and "There are very few voices for peace in places of power and we need them more than ever now, especially with what’s going on in Gaza". Wallace received 52,803 (7.7%) first preference votes but lost his seat. Clare Daly also lost her seat in the election.

=== Visit to Iraqi militia group ===
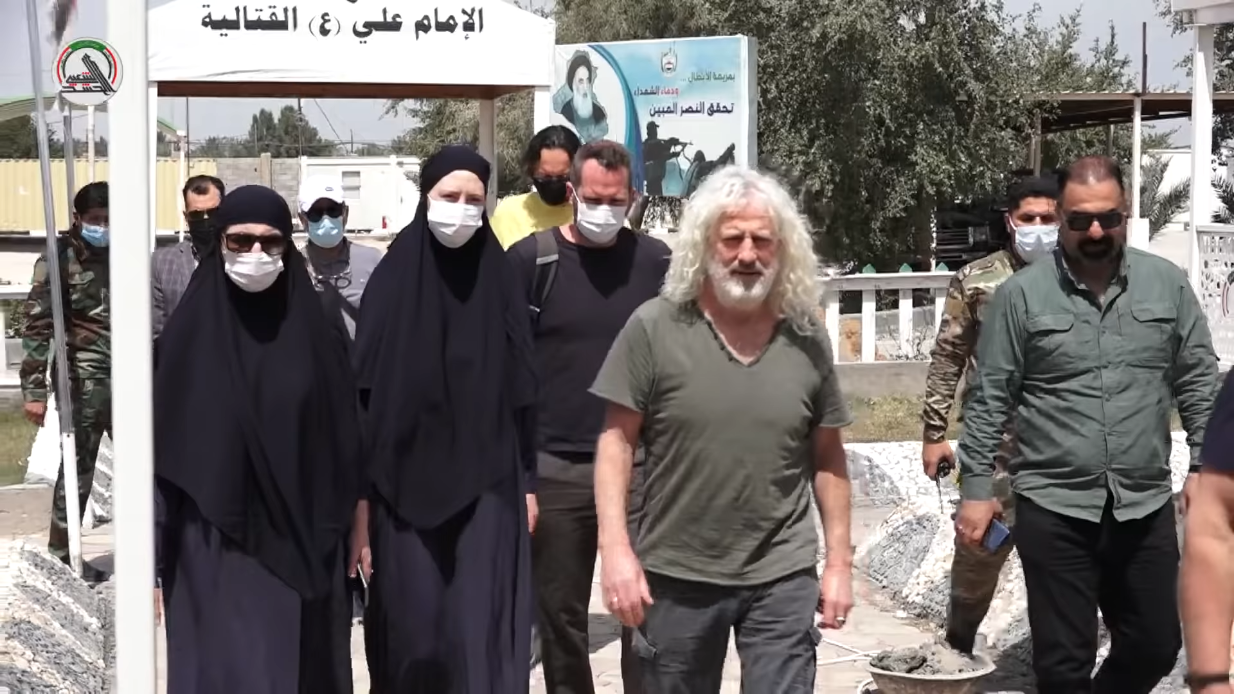
Clare Daly (left, in sunglasses) and Mick Wallace during their trip to Iraq in April 2021.

In April 2021, Wallace and Clare Daly were called "embarrassments to Ireland" by Fianna Fáil's Malcolm Byrne after the two MEPs travelled to Iraq and visited the headquarters of the Popular Mobilization Forces (Hashed al-Shaabi), an Iraqi militia supported by Iran. Byrne criticised them for meeting with a group that supports the oppression of gay people and accused them of being used as propaganda by the militia. Footage of their visit was used in a promotional video by the Popular Mobilization Forces.

=== Views on Syria ===
Wallace challenged the director general of the Organisation for the Prohibition of Chemical Weapons (OPCW), Fernando Arias, in the European Parliament in April 2021. He accused the OPCW of falsely blaming the government of Bashar al-Assad for the 2018 Douma chemical attack. He suggested that the White Helmets may have staged the attack and alleged they were "paid for by the US and UK to carry out regime change in Syria". Fianna Fáil’s Barry Andrews called Wallace's accusation against the White Helmets a conspiracy theory and disinformation. French MEP Nathalie Loiseau described Wallace's comments as "fake news" and apologised on his behalf to NGO groups in Syria.

In a European Parliament hearing in 2021, Wallace argued that Bashar Al-Assad had defended Syria from "genocidal extremists" and asked which of the policies of Assad or the United States were "more authoritarian".

Wallace has opposed sanctions against the Syrian government and was one of eight MEPs to put forward a motion to remove sanctions against the Syrian government.

=== Views on Russia and Ukraine ===
Wallace has consistently voted against resolutions critical of Vladimir Putin's Russia. He describes himself as fighting against "anti-Russian" rhetoric. According to The Irish Times, Wallace and Daly's positions on Putin's Russia have caused tensions with other members of The Left in the European Parliament. Wallace tabled amendments on behalf of the Left, seeking to "water down" resolutions against Russia. He sought to remove a statement that a Dutch-led investigation found that Russia's military supplied the missile which downed Malaysia Airlines Flight 17, killing 298 civilians.

In January 2022, Wallace described the Russian military buildup on Ukraine's border as being "clearly defensive" in reaction to NATO. He called for NATO to be abolished, alleging that it wanted a war and saying "it has nothing good to offer anyone that prefers peace". Amid fears of an invasion, Wallace was one of 52 MEPs who voted against offering Ukraine €1.2 billion in loans (compared to 598 MEPs in favour).

In March 2022, Wallace was one of 13 MEPs who voted against a European Parliament resolution condemning the Russian invasion of Ukraine. Wallace was criticised by constituents and others in Ireland, as well as the EU rapporteur on Ukraine, Michael Gahler, who said "Maybe he is under instruction from Moscow or the embassy there". Wallace explained that he opposed Russia's invasion, but did not back the resolution because it called for sending "defensive weapons to Ukraine", adding "the way forward is not putting in more arms ... the way forward is negotiation" with Russia. He said there must be acceptance of Russia's "genuine security concerns" about the idea of Ukraine joining NATO. Russian state media played clips of him criticising the EU response to the invasion.

Wallace has opposed broad sanctions against Russia for its invasion of Ukraine. He voted against a resolution to declare Russia a state sponsor of terrorism, and voted against establishing a tribunal to investigate the Russian leadership for crimes of aggression against Ukraine.

Several months into the Russian invasion, Wallace accused the EU and the governing parties in Ireland (Fianna Fáil and Fine Gael) of "promoting" and "loving" the war in Ukraine. He alleged it was "being fought on behalf of NATO" and said that EU states had been "bullied" into "taking sides" against Russia. He rejected claims that he supports Vladimir Putin, saying "he stole the election last year from the Communists, who I'd have liked to have seen winning it".

In a 2024 interview, Wallace described the invasion of Ukraine as a "US NATO proxy war" and said Russia were provoked into invading. Responding to positive media coverage his views have received in Russia, he said "It's hardly our fault if we're getting favourable press. Most people don't give out about favourable press. A lot of countries feel that we're calling things as they are."

==== Support for convicted and alleged Russian spies ====
In November 2021, Wallace and Daly travelled to Lithuania to support Algirdas Paleckis, a politician found guilty of spying for Russia. A trial found that Russia's Federal Security Service paid off his mortgage in return for information. Wallace said that Paleckis was "accused of being a Russian spy because he expressed an opinion that the State didn't like" and that the conviction was "authoritarianism". In May 2022, Paleckis's conviction for spying was upheld.

While in Lithuania, Wallace and Daly protested together with Latvian MEP Tatjana Ždanoka. Eight days before the Russian invasion of Ukraine, the three MEPs again protested together in the European Parliament wearing shirts bearing the Russian slogan "Stop killing Donbass children". In January 2024, Ždanoka was also accused of spying for Russian intelligence agencies in a joint investigation by Russian, Latvian, Estonian and Swedish journalists.

=== Views on China ===
Wallace has said he has "a lot of respect" for China, saying they have a "much more healthy state involvement in the organisation of society". In response to concerns about human rights abuses in the country, he responded "But sure 25% of the world's prisoners are in jail in America. Does anyone ever talk about it?", adding "There's human rights problems everywhere. There's human rights issues in Ireland."

Chinese state-owned news agency China Daily said that Wallace's tweets and speeches in the European Parliament challenging "anti-China rhetoric" have been widely reported by Chinese news outlets and social media. In May 2021, Wallace asked in the European Parliament: "Why are we choosing an aggressive position with China? Why are we not choosing co-operation instead of aggression? Why are we not respecting the principle of state sovereignty and non-interference? We should be working for peace with China, it’s in our interests". Fine Gael Teachta Dála (TD) Neale Richmond criticised his comments and questioned why Wallace was "lionizing China, Russia, Belarus, Syria".

In July 2021, Wallace said that reports of one million Uighurs being detained in Chinese re-education camps were "grossly exaggerated". He criticised what he saw as "anti-Chinese rhetoric" in the European Parliament and Irish media. Wallace said China "takes better care of its people" than the European Union in an interview with Chinese state-run newspaper Global Times, and said the Chinese Communist Party "deserved a lot of credit" for "helping so many hundreds of millions in China to move out of poverty".

In October 2021, Wallace posted a video on social media in which he said there was "never any solid evidence" of Xinjiang re-education camps. In the same video, Wallace said that Taiwan is "part of China" and "is recognised as such by the United Nations". Wallace's video was afterwards broadcast on Chinese state media, prompting the government of Taiwan to give an official rebuke of his claims. A spokesperson for the Taiwanese government in Dublin stated that the United Nations did "not authorise the People’s Republic of China to represent Taiwan in the United Nations, let alone claim that Taiwan is part of the People’s Republic of China. Taiwan is a vibrant democracy that is appreciated and supported by like-minded partners around the world. The right to democratic self-determination should not and will not be forfeited". Wallace's comments also prompted other Irish politicians to speak out against him. Fianna Fáil TD John McGuinness said he was "flabbergasted" upon seeing Wallace's video and called on him to remove it. Fine Gael Senator Jerry Buttimer called on Wallace to speak to Taiwanese groups in Ireland and to respect the right of "democratic self-determination".

A 2022 report by The Irish Times said that, since January 2021, Wallace had been featured in more Chinese-language news articles than any other Irish person aside from Daly. As a result of his fame in China, the Chinese have nicknamed him the "Golden Lion King" (Note: Chinese: 金毛狮王; pinyin: Jīn máo shī wáng) and "Silver Lion King". (Note: Chinese: 银毛狮王; pinyin: Yín máo shī wáng)

=== Venezuelan and Ecuadorian election monitoring ===
In June 2021, Wallace and Daly were among the MEPs censured by the European Parliament's Democracy Support and Election Coordination Group, for acting as unofficial election monitors in the December 2020 Venezuelan parliamentary election and April 2021 Ecuadorian general election, without a mandate or permission from the EU. Official EU overseas trips had also been suspended because of the COVID-19 pandemic. Wallace and Daly were barred until the end of 2021 from making any election missions. They were warned that any further such action may result in their ejection from the European Parliament. While MEPs can make personal trips overseas, according to The Irish Times, Wallace and Daly made no mention in their tweets that they were acting in an unofficial capacity.

Wallace and Daly issued a joint statement that read: "This is a political stunt by the centre right parties in the European Parliament, and we will be challenging it. These were not ‘fake’ election-observation trips. We made abundantly clear by public announcement at the time that we were not visiting Ecuador or Venezuela with an official election observation mandate". They continued: "Although we regret that the Ecuadorian people did not choose Andrés Arauz as their president, we found the elections to be conducted fairly and impartially". Ecuadorian election officials complained that Wallace could not be an objective election observer while openly supporting one side.

== Later political career ==
Two weeks after losing his seat in the European Parliament, Wallace was bereaved by the death of his son Joe Wallace in June 2024. Joe had frequently joined Wallace on his political campaigns.

In November 2024, Wallace announced that he would run in Wexford at the 2024 general election. He was unsuccessful in returning to the Dáil, having polled 1,615 first-preferences (3.1%), and was eliminated on the eighth count.

In March 2025, Wallace attended a conference in Sanaa, Yemen, hosted by the Houthis, Shia Islamist movement in Yemen, where he praised them for fighting against Israel's genocide in Gaza. Wallace denounced imperialism as "the source of terror", describing Europeans who support the "genocide in Gaza" as "barbaric". He said that Houthi-controlled Yemen was "one of the few countries adhering to international law".

== Financial and legal issues ==
=== Bankruptcy ===
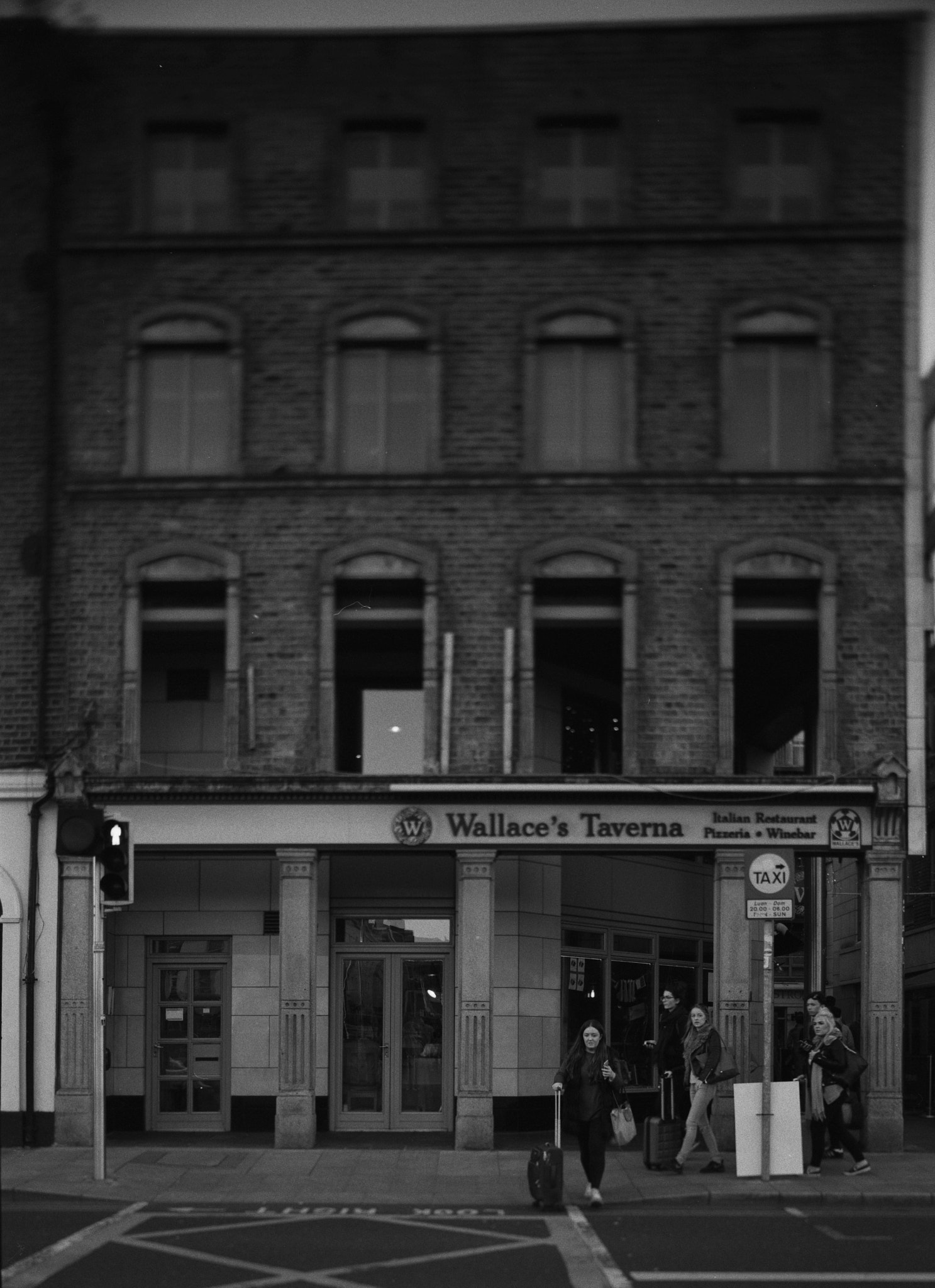
Wallace's Taverna in Wallace's Italian Quarter Development

In May 2011, Wallace said that he would face personal financial ruin and the possible loss of his Dáil seat, if banks were to chase him for personal guarantees he had given them. According to Wallace, his company had passed rents it collected directly to ACCBank since 2008. In a statement Wallace said: "I've tried to build well — we were a very successful company for a long time. We weren't bad, we weren't doing crazy things. We've made money every year for 20 years, employed a lot of people, paid our taxes. But the financial crisis arrived, completely undermined the value of our assets and we're no longer in a great place." He told RTÉ, "If a bank tries to make me bankrupt it has more to do with 'badness' than economics." On 10 October 2011, the Commercial Court ordered Wallace to repay more than €19 million owed to ACCBank. He said he did not have the money.

On 30 January 2016, it was ruled that Wallace would have to pay €2m to US vulture fund Cerberus. Wallace was finally declared bankrupt on 19 December 2016 with debts of over €30 million.

=== Withholding of employees pension contributions ===
In 2011, Wallace pleaded guilty to five charges of withholding his employees' pension contributions in a case taken by the Irish Pensions Board. Wallace said the case had arisen as a result of a "discrepancy" and that he had paid all of the money due.

=== Under-payment of tax ===
In June 2012, The Irish Times reported that Wallace had made a seven-figure settlement with the Revenue Commissioners for under-payment of VAT. The sum related to his company MJ Wallace Ltd. Wallace admitted in the course of the article that he had knowingly made false declarations to the authorities. Under the agreement with Revenue, MJ Wallace Ltd was found to have under-declared VAT liabilities on returns by €1,418,894. Interest came to €289,146 and penalties amounting to €425,668 were imposed, giving a total of €2,133,708. Ceann Comhairle Seán Barrett wrote to the Oireachtas Committee on Members' Interests Chairman, asking him to convene an inquiry.

=== Hitman comments ===
When Wallace stated on The Marian Finucane Show in October 2012 that back in 2005 he once "threatened to hire a hitman to recover an IR£20,000 debt from a building firm", a complaint was filed with Gardaí by a former Navy officer who runs a public information website. Later the same month, Finian McGrath resigned as chairman of the Dáil technical group when Wallace returned to the loose alliance against the wishes of many of its members.

=== Alan Shatter data breach controversy ===
During a debate between the Minister for Justice and Equality, Alan Shatter and Wallace on RTÉ television in May 2013, Shatter divulged that Wallace had been cautioned by Gardaí for using his phone while driving. Shatter was later found to have broken General Data Protection Regulation laws by revealing personal information about Wallace. Shatter said he obtained the information from then Garda Commissioner, Martin Callinan. Callinan and Shatter both lost their jobs soon afterward, Shatter partially for this breach of the law among other controversies. Wallace disagreed with the appointment of Callinan's successor Nóirín O'Sullivan, citing her previous role as deputy commissioner to Callinan.

=== Undeclared income as an MEP ===
In February 2023, Wallace claimed on social media that he had "three wine bars in Dublin". This aroused alarm from Wallace's European parliamentary group, as no such assets were listed on his mandatory declaration of financial interests. After the chair of his parliamentary group called any omission from the declaration "unacceptable” and not “worthy of our political group”, Wallace amended his declaration to state that he is an "advisor" to the three wine bars, and receives up to €500 a month in income for this role.

=== RTÉ lawsuit ===
In April 2022, Daly and Wallace sued for defamation against RTÉ, the Republic of Ireland's national broadcasting service, for undisclosed reasons. Their lawsuit was flagged as a potential threat to press freedom by the Index on Censorship and International Press Institute. The organizations alerted the Council of Europe, filing it under "harassment and intimidation of journalists". A statement from the Index on Censorship said "we believe that they are characteristic of strategic lawsuits against public participation – also known as SLAPPs".

== Notes ==
Dáil	Election	Deputy (Party)	Deputy (Party)	Deputy (Party)	Deputy (Party)	Deputy (Party)
2nd	1921	Richard Corish (SF)	James Ryan (SF)	Séamus Doyle (SF)	Seán Etchingham (SF)	4 seats 1921–1923
3rd	1922	Richard Corish (Lab)	Daniel O'Callaghan (Lab)	Séamus Doyle (AT-SF)	Michael Doyle (FP)	4 seats 1921–1923
4th	1923	Richard Corish (Lab)	James Ryan (Rep)	Robert Lambert (Rep)	Michael Doyle (FP)	Osmond Esmonde (CnaG)
5th	1927 (Jun)	Richard Corish (Lab)	James Ryan (FF)	James Shannon (Lab)	Michael Doyle (FP)	John Keating (NL)
6th	1927 (Sep)	Richard Corish (Lab)	James Ryan (FF)	Denis Allen (FF)	Michael Jordan (FP)	Osmond Esmonde (CnaG)
7th	1932	Richard Corish (Lab)	James Ryan (FF)	Denis Allen (FF)	John Keating (CnaG)	Osmond Esmonde (CnaG)
8th	1933	Richard Corish (Lab)	James Ryan (FF)	Patrick Kehoe (FF)	John Keating (CnaG)	Osmond Esmonde (CnaG)
8th	1936 by-election	Richard Corish (Lab)	James Ryan (FF)	Patrick Kehoe (FF)	John Keating (CnaG)	Denis Allen (FF)
9th	1937	Richard Corish (Lab)	James Ryan (FF)	John Keating (FG)	John Esmonde (FG)	Denis Allen (FF)
10th	1938	Richard Corish (Lab)	James Ryan (FF)	John Keating (FG)	John Esmonde (FG)	Denis Allen (FF)
11th	1943	Richard Corish (Lab)	James Ryan (FF)	John O'Leary (Lab)	John Esmonde (FG)	Denis Allen (FF)
12th	1944	Richard Corish (Lab)	James Ryan (FF)	John O'Leary (NLP)	John Keating (FG)	Denis Allen (FF)
12th	1945 by-election	Brendan Corish (Lab)	James Ryan (FF)	John O'Leary (NLP)	John Keating (FG)	Denis Allen (FF)
13th	1948	Brendan Corish (Lab)	James Ryan (FF)	John O'Leary (NLP)	John Esmonde (FG)	Denis Allen (FF)
14th	1951	Brendan Corish (Lab)	James Ryan (FF)	John O'Leary (Lab)	Anthony Esmonde (FG)	Denis Allen (FF)
15th	1954	Brendan Corish (Lab)	James Ryan (FF)	John O'Leary (Lab)	Anthony Esmonde (FG)	Denis Allen (FF)
16th	1957	Brendan Corish (Lab)	James Ryan (FF)	Seán Browne (FF)	Anthony Esmonde (FG)	Denis Allen (FF)
17th	1961	Brendan Corish (Lab)	James Ryan (FF)	Lorcan Allen (FF)	Anthony Esmonde (FG)	4 seats 1961–1981
18th	1965	Brendan Corish (Lab)	James Kennedy (FF)	Lorcan Allen (FF)	Anthony Esmonde (FG)	4 seats 1961–1981
19th	1969	Brendan Corish (Lab)	Seán Browne (FF)	Lorcan Allen (FF)	Anthony Esmonde (FG)	4 seats 1961–1981
20th	1973	Brendan Corish (Lab)	Seán Browne (FF)	Lorcan Allen (FF)	John Esmonde (FG)	4 seats 1961–1981
21st	1977	Brendan Corish (Lab)	Seán Browne (FF)	Lorcan Allen (FF)	Michael D'Arcy (FG)	4 seats 1961–1981
22nd	1981	Brendan Corish (Lab)	Ivan Yates (FG)	Lorcan Allen (FF)	Michael D'Arcy (FG)	Hugh Byrne (FF)
23rd	1982 (Feb)	Seán Browne (FF)	Ivan Yates (FG)	Lorcan Allen (FF)	Michael D'Arcy (FG)	Hugh Byrne (FF)
24th	1982 (Nov)	Avril Doyle (FG)	Ivan Yates (FG)	John Browne (FF)	Michael D'Arcy (FG)	Hugh Byrne (FF)
25th	1987	Avril Doyle (FG)	Ivan Yates (FG)	John Browne (FF)	Brendan Howlin (Lab)	Hugh Byrne (FF)
26th	1989	Michael D'Arcy (FG)	Ivan Yates (FG)	John Browne (FF)	Brendan Howlin (Lab)	Séamus Cullimore (FF)
27th	1992	Avril Doyle (FG)	Ivan Yates (FG)	John Browne (FF)	Brendan Howlin (Lab)	Hugh Byrne (FF)
28th	1997	Michael D'Arcy (FG)	Ivan Yates (FG)	John Browne (FF)	Brendan Howlin (Lab)	Hugh Byrne (FF)
29th	2002	Paul Kehoe (FG)	Liam Twomey (Ind.)	John Browne (FF)	Brendan Howlin (Lab)	Tony Dempsey (FF)
30th	2007	Paul Kehoe (FG)	Michael W. D'Arcy (FG)	John Browne (FF)	Brendan Howlin (Lab)	Seán Connick (FF)
31st	2011	Paul Kehoe (FG)	Liam Twomey (FG)	John Browne (FF)	Brendan Howlin (Lab)	Mick Wallace (Ind.)
32nd	2016	Paul Kehoe (FG)	Michael W. D'Arcy (FG)	James Browne (FF)	Brendan Howlin (Lab)	Mick Wallace (I4C)
32nd	2019 by-election	Paul Kehoe (FG)	Michael W. D'Arcy (FG)	James Browne (FF)	Brendan Howlin (Lab)	Malcolm Byrne (FF)
33rd	2020	Paul Kehoe (FG)	Verona Murphy (Ind.)	James Browne (FF)	Brendan Howlin (Lab)	Johnny Mythen (SF)
34th	2024	4 seats since 2024	Verona Murphy (Ind.)	James Browne (FF)	George Lawlor (Lab)	Johnny Mythen (SF)
