= Garda whistleblower scandal =

Police corruption scandal in Ireland

The Garda Whistleblower Scandal involved the revelation of corruption and malpractice within Ireland's national police force, the Garda Síochána, and the subsequent mishandling of the complaints that had been made by serving members of the force.

In 2014, material was revealed by two whistleblowers of the Garda Síochána, Maurice McCabe and John Wilson, to the Garda Confidential Recipient. The disclosures, and the handling of the disclosures, led to the resignation of Ireland's Minister for Justice and Equality, Alan Shatter, and the Garda Commissioner, Martin Callinan. It also led to the retirement of Callinan's successor as Commissioner, Nóirín O'Sullivan.

A subsequent investigation into the handling of the complaints found that McCabe was subjected to a smear campaign orchestrated by senior Garda officials, namely, Garda Press Officer Dave Taylor and former Commissioner Martin Callinan. The scandal had huge ramifications for both the Garda Siochana and the Irish government. It led to the resignation of Martin Callinan in March 2014, and Shatter from the Cabinet in May 2014.

A new 'Policing Authority' was established to ensure that scandal within the Garda Síochána remained at a minimum and that the Government could have more involvement with the daily operations of the organisation. The Irish government also pledged to launch a "new era of policing". Enda Kenny, who was Taoiseach for the majority of the scandal, apologised in Dáil Éireann for the damage caused to Maurice McCabe by Garda officials. The Disclosures Tribunal continued the investigation into the campaign against McCabe, and O'Sullivan resigned after the tribunal's findings were published. Frances Fitzgerald, a later Tánaiste, resigned over apparent mishandling of emails that discussed details of the scandal. She was later proven to have acted appropriately as Minister for Justice and Equality by the Charleton Tribunal.

== Whistleblowers ==
=== Maurice McCabe ===
Maurice McCabe was a Garda Sergeant, who came to national attention as a whistleblower on corruption within the Garda Síochána, Ireland's national police force. During the early 2000s, he served as sergeant-in-charge at the Garda station in Bailieborough, County Cavan. McCabe had expressed a number of concerns during his time as station sergeant. Incidents included off-duty Gardaí attempting to deal with a suicide situation, gardaí making use of unmarked Garda vehicles while off duty, and issues regarding the number of hours gardaí were actually working. McCabe lodged multiple complaints about slipping police standards in Bailieborough and the lack of initiative of several gardaí.

McCabe resigned as sergeant-in-charge of the station in January 2006 after an investigation into an assault in Crossan's Pub in the town was mishandled. The garda in charge of handling the situation had failed to investigate the incident properly and subsequently contacted the victim in the case. The victim was asked to withdraw the charges against the perpetrator. McCabe, who heard about this afterwards, was shocked and said that he had "never seen anything like it within the force". McCabe complained about the Garda Confidential Recipient system. This system, which was part of PULSE, a computer program used by the gardaí, was restricted from Maurice McCabe on 14 December 2012. Two senior gardaí travelled from Westmeath to his home in Cavan to communicate this to the Sergeant - an action that was previously unheard of within the force.

McCabe later approached Taoiseach Enda Kenny and Transport Minister Leo Varadkar, who passed details on to Justice Minister Alan Shatter. Shatter asked for an internal garda inquiry into complaints relating to driving licence penalty points, with Assistant Commissioner John O'Mahoney failing to even interview McCabe. A letter from McCabe, read onto the Oireachtas record, said the way the matter had been handled had "destroyed me, my career and my family". Shatter later wrongly accused McCabe of refusing to co-operate with his inquiry, a claim for which McCabe unsuccessfully sought an apology.

Luke 'Ming' Flanagan, at the time a TD, suggested McCabe be appointed Callinan's successor as Garda Commissioner.

On 31 October 2018, McCabe announced that he was retiring from the Garda Síochána that night.

=== John Wilson ===
John Wilson (born 17 April 1963) is a former garda, recognised for blowing the whistle on irregularities within the penalty points system for driving offences.

Wilson first brought information of Garda penalty points malpractice to the attention of members of Dáil Éireann under the Garda Siochána Act 2005 in 2012, having been unable to have the matter adequately handled within the Garda Complaints System. He left the force the following year, having served for more than 30 years (since 1982). In 2013, Wilson brought a High Court challenge to findings that he breached Garda discipline, but lost.

Wilson later approached Taoiseach Enda Kenny and Transport Minister Leo Varadkar, who passed details on to Justice Minister Alan Shatter. Shatter asked for an internal garda inquiry into the penalty points complaints, with Assistant Commissioner John O'Mahoney failing to even interview Wilson.

Wilson has recommended no tribunal, but has called for an independent public inquiry, suggesting, "Maybe an independent High Court judge; I would settle for that." He has asked that motorists who benefited from the alleged "corruption of gardaí" be interviewed. He also called for an apology from Shatter (who later resigned over the scandal) and from Kenny, saying that Shatter and Callinan "ridiculed" him for his actions.

== Guerin Report ==
In response to growing concern at mismanagement within the Garda Síochána arising from the whistleblower's allegations, the Guerin Report into corruption within the force was published on 9 May 2014. This looked only at issues raised by the serving garda, Sergeant Maurice McCabe.

The report, compiled by Sean Guerin SC, investigated allegations that serious crimes were improperly investigated by the police and was critical of the treatment of whistleblower McCabe, who was harassed and subjected to death threats after attempting to disclose information. Alan Shatter resigned as Minister for Justice and Equality in advance of its publication. His successor Frances Fitzgerald immediately announced the establishment of a Commission of Investigation.

Guerin recommended the establishment of a comprehensive Commission of Investigation whose terms of reference ought to include “definite matters of urgent public importance” such as the case of Jerry McGrath, who was convicted of murdering Sylvia Roche-Kelly in Limerick while on bail in 2007.

Guerin concluded: "No complex organisation can succeed in its task if it cannot find the means of heeding the voice of a member whose immediate supervisors hold in the high regard in which Sgt McCabe was held. Ultimately the Garda Síochána does not seem to have been able to do that. Nor does the Minister for Justice and Equality, despite his having an independent supervisory and investigation function with specific statutory powers. The same appears true of GSOC (Garda Síochána Ombudsman Commission), although this review is hampered in that regard by the fact that GSOC has not made documentation available."

On 13 May 2014, the government discussed the report at cabinet. Maurice McCabe, the whistleblower whose work prompted the report, spoke of feeling vindicated "after six years of fighting the system".

McCabe's fellow whistleblower John Wilson described the contents of the report as "disgusting, truly disgusting".

On 15 May 2014, during a Dáil debate on the issue, Pearse Doherty named Garda Keith Harrison as the latest whistleblower.

== Disclosures Tribunal ==
On 9 February 2017, a report in the Irish Examiner, and a subsequent Prime Time special, revealed how Maurice McCabe was treated in the aftermath of the scandal, including when he was reported to Tusla, the Child and Family Agency, for child sexual abuse. This provoked outrage, with McCabe stating his intention to sue the State over the accusations. In February 2017, the government promised another commission of investigation into the 2017 allegations, to be chaired by Peter Charleton, a judge of the Supreme Court. McCabe demanded a Tribunal of Inquiry, which would take evidence in public rather than in private, and the government agreed to this after opposition pressure.

Charleton formally opened the Disclosures Tribunal (Tribunal of Inquiry into protected disclosures made under the Protected Disclosures Act 2014 and certain other matters following Resolutions) with an introductory statement on 27 February 2017. Public sittings commenced on 4 July 2017. The first week of this module examined the circumstances surrounding the creation of an incorrect sexual abuse report and whether it was seized upon by senior gardai to blacken Sergeant McCabe's name.

At the end of November 2017, the second interim report of the Disclosures Tribunal found that claims by Garda Keith Harrison and his partner Marisa Simms were "entirely without any validity", that their allegations against social workers and police had "simply collapsed", and that social workers accused of abuse of office by them were "entitled to feel deeply upset at being targeted with such allegations". Garda Harrison said he was disappointed but not surprised by the findings.

On 11 October 2018, the third interim report of the Tribunal was released by Judge Peter Charleton. It vindicated Sergeant McCabe, former Commissioner Nóirín O'Sullivan and former Minister for Justice Frances Fitzgerald. It severely criticised former Commissioner Martin Callinan and former Garda press officer, Superintendent David Taylor.

In November 2018, Sean Ryan was appointed a second member of the tribunal.

== In popular culture ==
- Irish folk-punk poet Jinx Lennon included a song about the scandal on his 2020 album Border Schizo FFFolk Songs For The Fuc**d named 'McCabe + the Big Machine'.

== See also ==
- 2014 GSOC bugging scandal
- Garda phone recordings scandal
- Blue wall of silence
