= Nial Fennelly =

Irish judge (born 1942)

Judge of the Supreme Court
- In office 11 October 2000 – 21 May 2014
- Nominated by: Government of Ireland
- Appointed by: Mary McAleese

Advocate General of the European Court of Justice
- In office 19 March 1995 – 6 July 2000
- President: Gil Carlos Rodríguez Iglesias
- Preceded by: Claus Christian Gulmann
- Succeeded by: Günter Hirsch

Judge of the European Court of Justice
- In office 19 March 1995 – 6 July 2000
- Nominated by: Government of Ireland
- Appointed by: European Council

Personal details
- Born: 3 May 1942 (age 84) Dublin, Ireland
- Party: Fine Gael
- Education: University College Dublin; King's Inns

Nial Fennelly (born 3 May 1942) is a retired Irish judge who served as a Judge of the Supreme Court from 2000 to 2014, Advocate General of the European Court of Justice and a Judge of the European Court of Justice from 1995 to 2000.

He was educated at Clongowes Wood College, he then took a degree in economics at University College Dublin and completed his Bar studies at the King's Inns. He was a Barrister-at-Law from 1964 to 1995; when he was appointed as a senior counsel, he based himself full-time in Dublin, but when a junior barrister, he worked both there and on the Southeastern circuit. Fennelly was Chairman of the Bar Council of Ireland shortly before his appointment as Advocate General. Fennelly was also president of the Irish Society for European Law.

Fennelly was the sole member of the "Commission of Investigation (Certain Matters relative to An Garda Síochána and other persons)", commonly called the Fennelly Commission, a commission of investigation established in April 2014 by the Government of Ireland to investigate several controversies involving the Garda Síochána.

== See also ==
- List of members of the European Court of Justice
