= Martin Callinan =

Irish Garda Commissioner

19th Garda Commissioner
- In office 28 December 2010 – 25 March 2014
- Preceded by: Fachtna Murphy
- Succeeded by: Nóirín O'Sullivan

Personal details
- Born: 25 August 1953 (age 73) Dublin, Ireland
- Education: FBI National Academy

Martin Callinan (born 25 August 1953), is an Irish former Garda, who served as Garda Commissioner from 2010 to 2014.

Callinan is a two-time graduate of the FBI National Academy in Quantico, Virginia, qualifying in law enforcement management (1995) and the "National Executive Institute" programme (2010) for international Chiefs of Police. He holds a BA (Hons) Degree in Police Management.

== Early life ==
Callinan was born in Dublin in 1953. His father was from Galway and owned a shop in Drumcondra.

== Career ==
Callinan became a member of the Garda Síochána in 1973 and was promoted to the position of sergeant in 1986. Callinan quickly rose through the ranks of the organisation; he mainly served in Dublin, but he also spent had spells stationed in Waterford and County Mayo. As member of the Central Detective Unit, Callinan began to be assigned to high profile cases and began to become a prominent official within the force. He also took part in the Garda Crime and Security Branch and the Special Detective Unit.

In the early 1990s, he was appointed as head of the "Tango Squad", a group of Gardai who spent the large majority of their on-duty time monitoring the activities of Martin Cahill, a notorious Irish mob boss. The Tango Squad proved to be successful in thwarting many of Cahill's activities and preventing him from taking on any major criminal objectives; this helped boost Callinan's career significantly. By the time of Cahill's assassination by the Provisional IRA in 1994, Callinan was a detective inspector. Investigations into the Omagh bombing, and its perpetrators, the Real IRA, were led by Callinan. He also took part in Garda reviews of the Ryan Report and the Murphy Report.

In 2001, Callinan was promoted to chief superintendent and was later appointed as Assistant Commissioner of the National Support Services in 2005. The NSS has under its jurisdiction the National Bureau of Criminal Investigation, Garda National Drugs Unit, the Bureau of Fraud Investigation and the Criminal Assets Bureau. Callinan was further promoted in January 2007, by his friend and Garda Commissioner, Noel Conroy, to the position of Deputy Commissioner. Callinan was assigned to manage Strategy and Change Management but was soon reassigned to Operations; as part of this appointment, he was assigned with managing all policing within the Republic of Ireland and any national security issues.

Fachtna Murphy resigned as Garda Commissioner in late 2010; Martin Callinan, who by this time was an extremely well versed guard and had taken part in almost all areas of the force, was one of the top choices for the job. He was successful and appointed to the position on the 28 December 2010. Callinan's tenure as Garda Commissioner was rough, with multiple scandals uncovering during his time at the helm of the force. Over 100 Garda stations were closed during Callinan's 4 year leadership, for which he received harsh criticism. Reports from the Garda Síochána Ombudsman Commission, also known as GSOC, criticized the handling of Kieran Boylan, an informant to the Gardai about various drug trafficking cartels in Ireland. The Smithwick Tribunal also revealed serious concerns about the collusion of Gardai into murdering two Royal Ulster Constabulary officers in 1989. His time as Commissioner was further damaged by revelations of botched investigation procedures in regards to the murder of Sophie Toscan du Plantier in 1996. Callinan has also been scrutinized by journalist Gemma O'Doherty, who had pursued Callinan over allegations of penalty point cancellations, specifically in regards to Callinans own license. A number of weeks later, her employer, Independent News & Media, made O'Doherty redundant.

In November 2018, the government began a review into the legal costs of Callinan. The Taoiseach, Leo Varadkar, stated that the government had been in correspondence with the Attorney General in reviewing Callinan's legal costs which the state had covered prior to the Disclosures Tribunal. The Charleton Tribunal prompted the government to begin discussions about reviewing the money spent and advice was sought from the Attorney General on the legality of the matter.

== Views on whistleblowing ==
Callinan's views on whistleblowing became publicly known when two members of the force brought to the attention of members of Oireachtas that senior Gardaí had inappropriately wiped penalty points from driving licences. The whistleblowers, Maurice McCabe and John Wilson, made their allegations to the Oireachtas Public Accounts Committee. When Martin Callinan appeared before the Public Accounts Committee he described the actions of the men as "disgusting". Following these comments a report by the Independent Garda Inspectorate described a consistent and widespread pattern of breaches of policy by those administering the system. In March 2014, Martin Callinan announced his retirement, earlier than had been expected. Around the same time the early retirement of Chief Superintendent Kevin Donohoe, head of Special Branch (SDU), was also made known. Weeks later, Minister for Justice Alan Shatter announced his resignation.

Callinan's resignation coincided with the outbreak of two other scandals; allegations that the Garda Síochána Ombudsman Commission (GSOC) was under surveillance by an unknown group which had used "government-level technology" following a counter-surveillance operation undertaken by a British private security firm, and the emergence that phone calls in Garda stations throughout the country had been recorded on a mass scale for over 30 years before the practice was brought to an end. The government in April 2014 established a commission of investigation into Callinan's resignation and these other issues. It is commonly called the Fennelly Commission after its sole member, Nial Fennelly, a retired justice of the Supreme Court. In September 2015, the commission issued an interim report relating to Callinan's retirement.

Deputy Commissioner Nóirín O'Sullivan replaced Callinan as the Garda Commissioner.

Callinan was finally found by Mr Justice Charlton to have conducted a campaign of “calumny” against Maurice McCabe and was publicly disgraced as a consequence, McCabe was vindicated as an exemplary police officer.

Police appointments
Preceded by Fachtna Murphy	Garda Commissioner; 2010–2014	Succeeded by Nóirín O'Sullivan
