= Anthony Barr (judge) =

Irish barrister, High Court judge since 2013

The Hon. Mr. Justice Anthony Barr

Judge of the High Court
- Incumbent
- Assumed office 25 July 2013
- Nominated by: Government of Ireland
- Appointed by: Michael D. Higgins

Personal details
- Born: 1961 (age 64–65)
- Education: University College Dublin; King's Inns

Anthony Barr (born 1961) is an Irish judge who has served as a Judge of the High Court since July 2013.

== Early life ==
Barr grew up in Foxrock, Dublin 18. His father Robert Barr, who was married to Mary Roche, was also a High Court judge and conducted the Barr Tribunal. His grandfather Robert Barr was part of the A.G. Barr family which created Irn-Bru.

He graduated from University College Dublin with a BCL in 1983. He subsequently obtained a Diploma in Arbitration from there in 2007. He attended the King's Inns and became a barrister in 1985.

== Legal career ==
He became a senior counsel in 2004. He was counsel for the Morris Tribunal between 2002 and 2008.

He was vice-chairman of the Irish Branch of the Chartered Institute of Arbitrators at the time of his judicial nomination to the High Court.

== Judicial career ==
He was appointed to the High Court in July 2013. He is a member of the Superior Courts Rules Committee at the Courts Service. He has heard cases including those related to medical negligence, personal injuries, judicial review, and bankruptcy.

He refused an application by John Delaney of the FAI against The Sunday Times to block the publication of details of a loan Delaney had provided to the organisation.
