= Alan Shatter =

Irish former politician (born 1951)

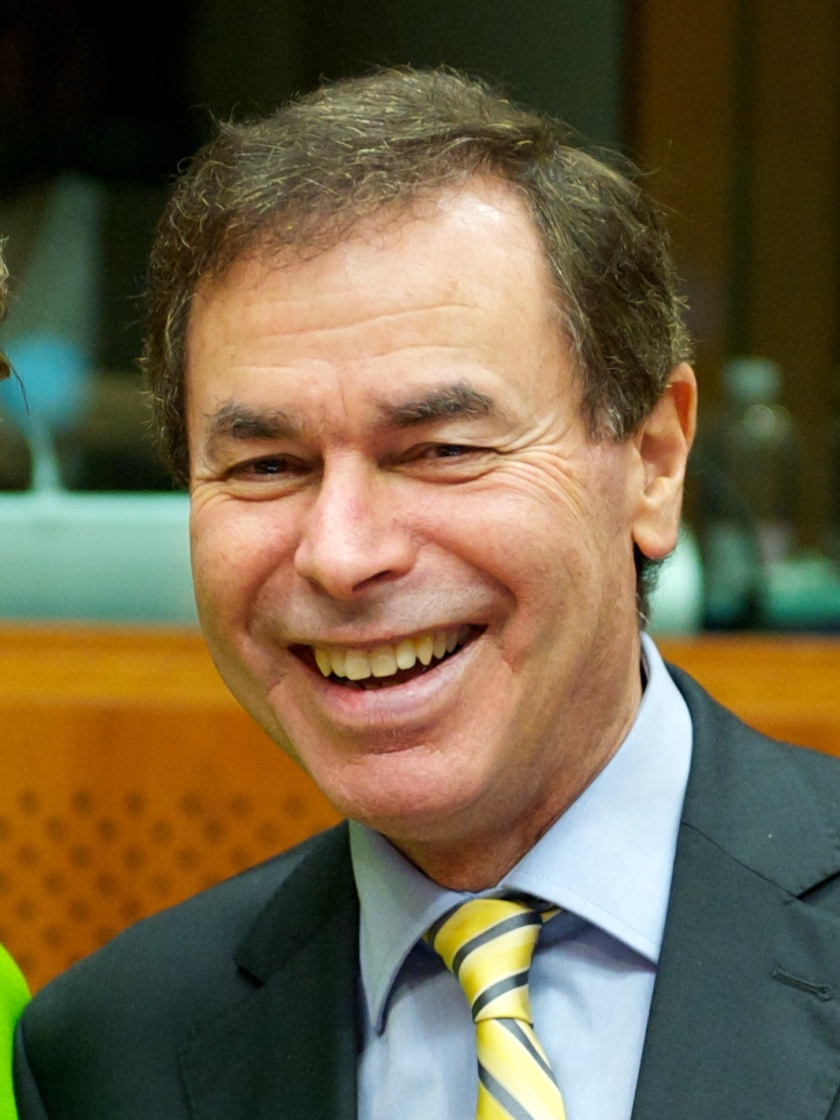
- Shatter in 2013

Minister for Justice and Equality
- In office 9 March 2011 – 7 May 2014
- Taoiseach: Enda Kenny
- Preceded by: Brendan Smith (Justice and Law Reform)
- Succeeded by: Frances Fitzgerald

Minister for Defence
- In office 9 March 2011 – 7 May 2014
- Taoiseach: Enda Kenny
- Preceded by: Éamon Ó Cuív
- Succeeded by: Enda Kenny (acting)

Teachta Dála
- In office May 2007 – February 2016
- In office June 1981 – May 2002
- Constituency: Dublin South

Personal details
- Born: 14 February 1951 (age 75) Rathgar, Dublin, Ireland
- Party: Independent; Fine Gael (to 2018)
- Spouse: Carol Ann Danker (m. 1982)
- Children: 2
- Education: Trinity College Dublin

Alan Joseph Shatter (born 14 February 1951) is an Irish lawyer, author and former Fine Gael politician who served as Minister for Justice and Equality and Minister for Defence from 2011 to 2014. He was a Teachta Dála (TD) for the Dublin South constituency from 1981 to 2002 and from 2007 to 2016. He left Fine Gael in early 2018 and ran as an independent candidate at the 2024 general election, but was not elected.

Since his retirement from politics, he has published Life is a Funny Business (2017), Frenzy and Betrayal: The Anatomy of a Political Assassination (2019) and Cyril's Lottery of Life (2023)

He has had occasional opinion articles published in The Irish Times, the Irish Independent, the Sunday Independent, the Business Post, the Jerusalem Post and the Times of Israel.

He is chairperson of the Inheritance Tax Reform Campaign and of Magen David Adom Ireland.

He is also a board member of the Israel Council on Foreign Relations.

== Personal life ==
Born in Dublin to a Jewish family, Shatter is the son of Elaine and Reuben Shatter, an English couple who met by chance when they were both on holiday in Ireland in 1947. He was educated at The High School, Dublin, Trinity College Dublin and the Europa Institute of the University of Amsterdam. In his late teens, he worked for two months in Israel on a kibbutz.

Shatter has lived most of his life in Dublin; he grew up in Rathgar and Rathfarnham and lives now in Ballinteer with his wife, Carol Ann (Danker) Shatter. He has two adult children. With interests in fifteen properties, Shatter had the largest property portfolio of any member of Ireland's cabinet while a cabinet minister (2011–2014).

== Legal and writing career ==
Shatter was a partner in the Dublin law firm Gallagher Shatter (1977–2011). As a solicitor, he acted as an advocate in many seminal and leading cases in the High Court and Supreme Court. He is the author of one of the major academic works on Irish family law (1977, 1981, 1986 and 1997) which advocated substantial constitutional and family law reform. As a politician, he played a lead role in effecting much of the constitutional and legislative change he advocated. He is a former chairperson of the Free Legal Advice Centres (FLAC), a former chairperson of CARE, an organisation that campaigned for child care and children's legislation reform in the 1970s and a former President of the Irish Council Against Blood Sports. Among his professional affiliations, he is a Fellow of the International Academy of Matrimonial Lawyers.

He is also the author of the satirical book Family Planning Irish Style (1979), and the novel Laura (1989). The former satirised the Health (Family Planning) Act 1979 with cartoons by Chaim Factor, a well-known artist and sculptor. Amongst his targets was a provision which required a medical prescription to purchase condoms with the prescription designating the monthly number of condoms that could be lawfully purchased. Life is a Funny Business (2017) is a memoir of the years before his election to the Dáil and their relationship to later events. Frenzy and Betrayal: The Anatomy of a Political Assassination (2019) is his account of controversies that occurred in the period immediately preceding his resignation from the government in May 2014, and the reports on these events.

In 2023, his book Cyril's Lottery of Life, a comedic book with an English solicitor from a small town as its protagonist, was published.

== Political career ==
Shatter entered politics at the 1979 local elections, winning a seat on Dublin County Council for the Rathfarnham local electoral area. He retained this seat until 1999 (becoming a member of South Dublin County Council in 1994). Shatter was first elected to the Dáil at the 1981 general election and was re-elected at each subsequent election until he lost his seat at the 2002 general election. He was re-elected at the 2007 general election.

In 1983, Shatter defied his party's whip to vote against the inclusion in the Irish constitution of an anti-abortion provision.

While in opposition, he published more private member's bills than any other TD had done previously. The Judicial Separation and Family Law Reform Act 1989, radically reforming Irish family law, was the first enacted legislation which had begun as a private member's bill from an opposition TD for 35 years. The Adoption Act 1991 had also been introduced by Shatter as a private member's bill; this provided for the recognition for the first time of foreign adoptions in Ireland. The Environment Protection Agency Bill 1989 embraced the precautionary principle prioritizing environmental protection principles in government decision-making. The bill was defeated, but the government proposed its legislation soon after, with the Environmental Protection Agency established under the Environmental Protection Agency Act 1992

During the 1980s, Shatter successfully lobbied for the establishment of an Oireachtas Committee on Foreign Affairs. He was a member of the Committee from its foundation in 1992, apart from a brief period in 1993 to 1994, and its chairman from December 1996 to June 1997. He was also for many years a member of the Oireachtas Committee on Justice, Law Reform and Defence.. Shatter was the founder of the Ireland–Israel Parliamentary Friendship Group and acted as its chairperson for many years. In 1985, Shatter visited the Soviet Union together with his Fine Gael colleague, Senator Seán O'Leary, and met with various Jewish refusenik families who had been prevented from emigrating to Israel and were in substantial difficulties with some family members imprisoned and others fired from academic and scientific jobs and forced to engage in menial employment. Upon returning to Dublin, Shatter and O'Leary published a report and held a press conference on their plight. The previous year on International Human Rights Day Shatter proposed a Dáil motion on the plight of Soviet Jewry which was passed and adopted by Dáil Éireann. Subsequently, similar motions were adopted in other European Parliaments. He is a former member of the Health and Children Committee and the Special Committee that considered the wording for a children's rights referendum. The wording he drafted substantially influenced the content of an amendment on children's rights incorporated into the Irish Constitution after a successful referendum in 2012

In 1998, he was the author of a report published by the Health Committee which criticised tobacco companies and recommended various controls on smoking and tobacco advertising. In the years that followed most of the recommendations made were implemented by the government.

In June 1993, he broke the party whip by voting in favour of a Bill to ban live hare coursing. Party leader John Bruton removed Shatter from the Foreign Affairs Committee as a disciplinary measure. He was restored to the Foreign Affairs committee in 1994.

He was Fine Gael Front Bench Spokesperson on Law Reform (1982, 1987–1988); the Environment (1989–1991); Labour (1991); Justice (1992–1993); Equality and Law Reform (1993–1994); Health and Children (1997–2000); Justice, Law Reform and Defence (2001–2002); Children (2007–2010); and Justice and Law Reform (2010–2011).

During the 2009 Gaza War, Sinn Féin TD Aengus Ó Snodaigh said that Shatter and the Israeli Ambassador to Ireland had exposed the Oireachtas committee on Foreign Affairs to "propaganda, twisted logic and half-truths". Ó Snodaigh also said that Joseph Goebbels, the Nazi propaganda minister, would have been proud of it. The Sinn Fein TD's attack on Shatter generated controversy, resulting in strong criticism of Ó Snodaigh from members of the ruling coalition and the Israeli embassy. In February 2009, during a sitting of the Joint Committee on Foreign Affairs concerning the Gaza conflict, Shatter clashed verbally with Israeli historian Ilan Pappé, Professor of History at the University of Exeter, accusing Pappé of biased scholarship and historical inaccuracies. Shatter opposed the Control of Economic Activity (Occupied Territories) Bill 2018 to ban the sale of products from Israeli settlements in Ireland.

On 9 March 2011, Shatter was appointed by the Taoiseach Enda Kenny as both Minister for Justice and Equality and Minister for Defence.

=== Minister for Justice (2011–2014) ===
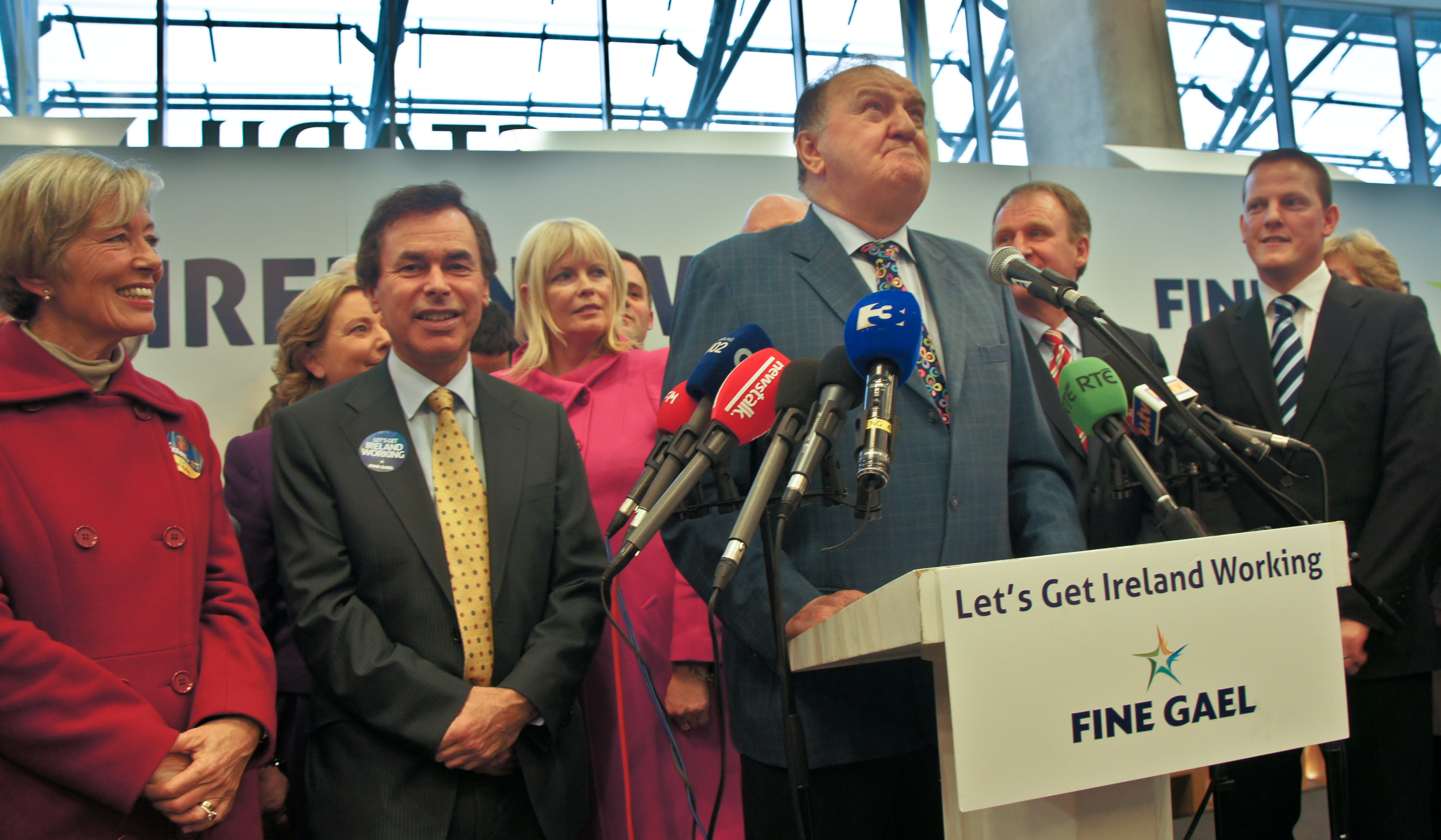
Shatter (second from left) with other Fine Gael politicians at the Aviva Stadium following the 2011 election

Under Shatter's steerage, a substantial reform agenda was implemented with nearly 30 separate pieces of legislation published, many of which are now enacted including the Personal Insolvency Act 2012, Criminal Justice Act 2011, DNA Database Act, and the Human Rights and Equality Commission Act. Under his guidance, major reforms were introduced in 2011 into Ireland's citizenship laws and a new Citizenship Ceremony was created. Shatter both devised and piloted Ireland’s first-ever citizenship ceremony which took place in June 2011 and a new inclusive citizenship oath which he included in his reforming legislation. During his time as Minister, he cleared an enormous backlog of citizenship applications and 69,000 foreign nationals became Irish citizens. Some applications had lain dormant for 3 to 4 years. He introduced a general rule that save where there was some real complication, all properly made citizenship applications should be processed within six months. Shatter also took steps to facilitate an increased number of political refugees being accepted into Ireland and created a special scheme to facilitate relations of Syrian families already resident in Ireland who were either caught up in the civil war in Syria, or in refugee camps elsewhere as a result of the civil war in Syria, to join their families in Ireland.

Shatter had enacted legislation before the end of July 2011 to facilitate access to financial documentation and records held by third parties in investigations into banking scandals and white-collar crime. The legislation was first used by the Gardaí in September 2011. As Justice Minister, he initiated the making of unprecedented arrangements with Brazil, a state with which Ireland had no extradition treaty, to effect rogue solicitor Michael Lynn’s extradition to Ireland for prosecution on numerous criminal charges relating to Lynn’s fraudulent financial conduct.

During Ireland's Presidency of the Council of the European Union in 2013, he chaired the Justice and Home Affairs Council (JHA) meetings and, in January 2013, in Dublin Castle, the meeting of EU Defence Ministers. Under his guidance, Ireland played a more active role than in the past in EU defence matters and in deepening Ireland's participation in NATO's partnership for peace. Under his guidance, during the Irish Presidency, substantial progress was made at the European Union level in the adoption and development of new legislation and measures across a broad range of Justice and Home Affairs issues.

In June 2011, he apologised for "unfair and inaccurate" comments he made about RTÉ crime correspondent Paul Reynolds after saying he "consistently engages in tabloid sensationalism". When eight former attorneys general criticised the proposed Thirtieth Amendment of the Constitution on Oireachtas inquiries he described their views as "nonsense" and "simply wrong".

Shortly after taking office, the Cloyne report which had been commissioned by the previous government to investigate clerical sex abuse of children in the Diocese of Cloyne, was released. In response to this report and several other sex abuse scandals involving the Catholic Church, the Fine Gael–Labour Party government announced controversial plans to criminalise failure to report an allegation of child abuse. Seán Brady, the Catholic Archbishop of Armagh, condemned this as compromising the Seal of the Confessional. Shatter steered the legislation through the parliament and it was enacted in 2012.

Following the publication in 2012 of the report of Independent Senator Martin McAleese into the Magdalene Laundries, which Shatter commissioned, he established with government agreement a financial scheme to compensate the survivors of the laundries and other supportive measures. A state apology for the survivors' ill-treatment by various religious orders was, as a result of Shatter's engagement with this long-ignored issue, made in the Dail by the Taoiseach, Enda Kenny. The plight of the survivors of the laundries had been ignored for decades and there was widespread welcome for the government action taken.

Major reform of the Irish prison system occurred and greater co-operation between the prison and probation services was implemented. A prison modernisation programme was implemented and slopping out virtually ended. Mountjoy Prison was refurbished to provide proper in-cell sanitation and construction of a new Cork Prison was commenced. He also enacted legislation to require the courts to make greater use of community service orders for minor offences and to facilitate the payment of court-imposed fines by instalment.

In September 2011, Shatter published the Legal Services Reform Bill to modernise the legal profession, introduce greater competition and tackle the problem of excessive legal costs. The Bill generated enormous opposition from both the barristers and solicitors' professional bodies. It was welcomed by the Competition Authority and some other bodies, including the Troika to whom the Irish government was obliged to report as a result of the financial and banking collapse. Shatter engaged in an extensive consultative process on the Bill and it was substantially amended and improved as it went through the legislative process. Shatter refused to amend the provisions designed to reduce legal costs increase competition and enable barristers and solicitors to work together jointly as court advocates and in partnerships. The barristers' opposition to the bill remained strident whilst the solicitors became supportive of most of its provisions. The Bill still had to complete its enactment when Shatter resigned in May 2014. Following Shatter's resignation, his successor as Justice minister, Frances Fitzgerald amended some of the provisions.

On 3 March 2012, a convicted Garda killer escaped from a low-security open detention centre Loughan House in County Cavan and fled across the border into Northern Ireland. Shatter later apologised and said "it should not have occurred".

Shatter's proposal to cabinet in the autumn of 2013 that a referendum on marriage equality be held in the first half of 2015 was accepted and with cabinet agreement, he published in February 2014 the draft Children and Family Relationships Bill to substantially reform and modernise various aspects of child and family law. The legislation was enacted shortly before the referendum was held in 2015. The legislation enacted substantially reflected the draft bill Shatter published, save that the government omitted provisions relating to surrogacy, announcing in September 2014 that the issue would be addressed in separate legislation. Provisions on surrogacy were later enacted under the Health (Assisted Human Reproduction) Act 2024.

He was the Minister responsible for two amendments to the Constitution of Ireland which were passed in referendums: the Twenty-ninth Amendment in 2011 to allow for the reduction of judges' pay, and the Thirty-third Amendment in 2013 to establish a Court of Appeal. Just before he resigned from government the draft legislation to create the court was published and the court was established and sitting by October 2014.

The jurisdictions of the courts were extended for the first time in 20 years and the maximum civil damages payable for the emotional distress of bereaved relations following a negligent death was increased.

=== Minister for Defence (2011–2014) ===
Shatter implemented substantial reform in the Department of Defence and restructured the Irish Defence Forces. During the financial crises resulting from the banking collapse, when Ireland was under the supervision of the Troika, Shatter successfully fought to ensure the defence forces had adequate finance to maintain a strength of 9,500 and resisted pressure to reduce the numbers to 7,500. Between 2011 and 2014, he ensured new members continued to be recruited to the army, navy and air corps. He is a strong supporter of the Irish Defence Forces' participation in international peacekeeping and humanitarian engagements. As a member of the Irish Parliament and as Minister on many occasions, he visited Irish troops participating in UN missions in the Middle East. Under his watch contracts were signed for the acquisition of 2 new naval vessels with an option to purchase a third. All three naval vessels are now part of the Irish naval service and have been actively engaged in recent years in rescuing from drowning refugees in the Mediterranean attempting to enter Europe. As Minister for Defence, he enacted legislation to grant a pardon and an amnesty to members of the Irish defence forces who deserted during World War 2 to fight on the allied side against Nazi Germany and gave a state apology for their post-war treatment by the Irish State.

=== Penalty points controversy ===
In November and December 2012 controversy arose as a result of some Independent TDs alleging Gardaí had unlawfully cancelled road traffic tickets and penalty points and naming individuals in the Dail who it was alleged had broken the law. Shatter stated that caution should be exercised in assuming all the allegations made were accurate pending the completion of an investigation, expressed concern about individuals being so named and promised to publish the investigation report. In December 2012, he also stated that if following the completion of the investigation he had any remaining concerns he would refer the issue to the independent Garda Inspectorate. In May 2013, he published two Garda reports. They established that in approximately 2.5% of cases examined, there had been a failure to properly comply with Garda procedures and recommended the introduction of reforms. Shatter described some of the decisions made cancelling penalty points as "exotic" and defying common sense. He published a code of practice to apply in the future and requested an independent report from the Garda Inspectorate. It was published 9 months later, proposed further reforms and endorsed Shatter's code of practice. In March 2014, Shatter announced the government's agreement to implement all of the recommended reforms. When publishing the May 2013 Reports, Shatter acknowledged the role played by a Garda whistle-blower in identifying Garda failures while expressing concern about some inaccurate allegations made that had been widely publicised and fueled some of the political and media controversy relating to the issue, including an inaccurate allegation that 7 individuals had died in traffic accidents because of the cancellation of penalty points. In the Dail in October 2013, he criticised a whistleblower for not cooperating with the original Garda investigation into his allegations. This generated further controversy and criticism of Shatter by his political opponents. Following the publication of the Garda Inspectorates report, he apologised to the whistleblower in the Dail, explaining he understood the whistleblower had co-operated with the Inspectorate and that he now believed the Gardaí should have done more to engage with him before May 2013. During hearings of the Disclosures Tribunal in 2018, it emerged from evidence given by Shatter and Garda Assistant Commissioner O’Mahony that the whistleblower, Maurice McCabe, had requested anonymity when alleging Garda failures, that request had been respected and it was the reason why he had not been interviewed during the Garda investigation into his allegations relating to traffic charges and penalty points.

=== GSOC bugging affair ===
In February 2014, the Irish edition of The Sunday Times ran a series of stories claiming that the offices of the Garda Síochána Ombudsman Commission (GSOC) had been bugged with a variety of highly sophisticated bugging equipment available only to government-level actors. GSOC's sole responsibility is to investigate wrongdoing in the Irish police force, the Garda Síochána, and there was widespread speculation that the Garda, or some rogue members or former members were responsible for the bugging to forestall investigations. John Mooney, the journalist who wrote the story, explicitly linked the bugging to GSOC's investigation of Garda handling of the case of Kieran Boylan, the convicted drug-runner who was assisted by gardaí in obtaining a passport, a haulage licence and had a prosecution for drug running terminated in extraordinary circumstances. Mooney reported that GSOC called in a specialist British counter-surveillance firm after a senior Garda, in a meeting with GSOC, let slip that he knew of information which GSOC staff had discussed including in a report, but had not included.

Shatter, as Justice Minister, had responsibility for both the Garda and GSOC. Statements he made in the aftermath of the revelation were critical of GSOC. Shatter both questioned the conclusion that GSOC offices were bugged and criticised it for not informing him of the alleged bugging before he read GSOC’s alleged concerns in February 2013 in the Sunday Times… He stated there was no evidence that GSOC’s offices had been bugged at all or of any Garda involvement, asserting that the source of one of the anomalies found was a WiFi signal from a coffee shop on the ground floor of GSOC's offices. He said that the Gardaí had been subjected to "baseless innuendo". Although GSOC itself had concluded by December 2013 that it had not been bugged and that there was no evidence of any Garda misconduct, both opposition politicians and sections of the media accused Shatter of a cover up and he was under sustained media criticism and political attack. A retired High Court Judge, John Cooke was appointed by the government to conduct an independent informal inquiry which he concluded in June 2014. Cooke fully engaged with GSOC and obtained independent technical assistance. His report confirmed that Shatter had correctly and truthfully addressed the issue, that there was no evidence that GSOC had been bugged or of any Garda involvement and he criticised the Sunday Times reports. The Sunday Times was further criticised by a Senior Counsel in a further report on the issue, commissioned by GSOC, extracts from which were published in September 2014. The Sunday Times never responded to the criticism, explained or apologized for its conduct.

=== Connections with Oliver Connolly ===
Oliver Connolly, a barrister, arbitrator, mediator and director of Friary Law, a mediation service nominated by two previous Justice Ministers to conduct court-directed mediation was appointed in 2011 by Shatter as the Garda Confidential Recipient, an office intended to receive complaints of wrongdoing confidentially from gardaí who have evidence of malpractice in the force. In February 2014, a transcript of a conversation between Connolly and Sergeant Maurice McCabe, a whistleblower, recorded by McCabe was made public. Initially extracts from the transcript were recited in the Dail by Mick Wallace TD and Leader of the Opposition, Micheál Martin. In it, Connolly appeared to be repeatedly telling McCabe not to take any steps that would lead to the publication of wrongdoing that he was reporting. Connolly is quoted as saying "I’ll tell you something Maurice and this is just personal advice to you. If Shatter thinks your [sic] screwing him, you’re finished … If Shatter thinks it's you, if he thinks or is told by the Commissioner or the Gardaí here’s this guy again trying another route trying to put pressure on, he’ll go after you." On 5 February 2014, these comments were read into the Dáil record by Mick Wallace, the independent TD.

Following the emergence of the GSOC bugging controversy, these comments were featured more prominently in news media. Shatter informed the Dail that there was no basis for what was alleged by Connolly and that he had never made any such threats. On 19 February, Shatter sacked Connolly as Garda Confidential Recipient. This issue coinciding with the GSOC bugging issue and further fuelled the controversy, resulting in trenchant media and political criticism and calls for Shatter's resignation. Connolly in March 2014 issued a statement expressing support for Shatter as a reforming Minister but declined to explain his comments as contained in the McCabe transcript on the basis that his conversations as a confidential recipient with whistleblowers were confidential. Until his resignation, Shatter continued to be publicly criticised for making alleged threats against McCabe. The O'Higgins Report published in May 2016 addressed the issue. It fully accepted Shatter's evidence that he had not had any such discussion with Connolly nor ever threatened McCabe. It also recorded that McCabe did not challenge and accepted Shatter's evidence and that Connolly had when appearing before it declined to address the issue on the basis that his engagement with McCabe was confidential.

=== Guerin Report, O'Higgins Report, Fennelly Report, resignation and loss of seat ===
On 25 March 2014, the Garda Commissioner, Martin Callinan announced his retirement as Garda Commissioner. It subsequently emerged that his unexpected departure was connected to the discovery of previously publicly unknown Garda recordings of phone conversations in Garda stations for over two decades. The circumstances relating to the Commissioner's premature retirement and the role of the Taoiseach and the actions of Attorney General, Maire Whelan and Alan Shatter as Minister of Justice were the subject of a statutory Commission of Investigation by retired Supreme Court Judge, Niall Fennelly. The Commissioner had written to Brian Purcell, the Secretary General of the Justice Department on 10 March 2014, informing him of the discovery of the recordings and action being taken. The Gardaí had also informed the Attorney General of the issue the previous autumn. Shatter claimed he knew nothing of the letter until after the Commissioner's resignation when some hours later he received a copy of it from the Secretary General of the Justice Department. His political opponents and various media commentators challenged and ridiculed this claim. This added to the controversy in which he was embroiled. Upon publication of the Interim Fennelly Report in September 2015, Fennelly determined that Shatter had told the truth and criticised Whelan for not discussing the issue with him and Purcell for not furnishing the Commissioner's letter to Shatter after he received it. Whelan and Kenny had discussed the recordings issue together on 23 March 2014 and Fennelly was critical of their failure after that meeting to inform Shatter of their concerns about the recordings. Fennelly concluded that had they done so the Commissioner's retirement may not have occurred. Shatter claimed that he had not been informed of the recordings until the evening of 24 March 2014. His political opponents alleged he knew of them earlier. The Fennelly Report found also that Shatter was truthful on this issue. The Fennelly Report recorded evidence given by Shatter that contradicted that of Whelan and Kenny about the task given by Kenny to Purcell when visiting the Commissioner on Kenny's direction the night before his premature retirement, on 23 March 2014. Kenny claimed that Purcell was tasked to obtain information from Callinan. Shatter claimed he was tasked with informing Callinan that following the next day's cabinet meeting Kenny may be unable to express confidence in Callinan. Shatter's evidence accorded with that of Purcell and Martin Fraser, Kenny's Secretary General in the Taoiseach's Department. The evidence of Whelan and Kenny on the issue was rejected by Fennelly.

On 7 May 2014, Shatter resigned as Minister for Justice and Equality and as Minister for Defence following receipt by the Taoiseach, Enda Kenny, of the report of Seán Guerin into allegations made by Garda Sergeant Maurice McCabe. Guerin criticised Shatter's approach to complaints and allegations made by McCabe and concluded that Shatter had "not heeded" McCabe's voice. The government accepted, adopted and published the report, lodging it in the Oireachtas library. In his resignation letter and six weeks later in the Dail, Shatter challenged Guerin's conclusions and criticism of him asserting that Guerin had neither interviewed him nor given him any opportunity to address his concerns. He stated that Guerin's report recorded Guerin had met McCabe on four separate occasions and conducted nineteen hours of interviews with him. In July 2014, Shatter took court proceedings against Guerin challenging how he conducted his inquiry. In May 2016, following a sworn Commission of Investigation presided over by retired High Court Judge Kevin O’Higgins, the O'Higgins Report concluded that Shatter, as Minister for Justice, had taken a personal interest in McCabe's complaints and allegations, had dealt with them appropriately, promptly, properly and reasonably and that there had been a failure by McCabe to respond to letters sent by Shatter and his officials to McCabe's solicitors in the period October 2012 to December 2014. O'Higgins's conclusions entirely contradicted those of Guerin's informal Inquiry. In October 2016, the Court of Appeal ruled that Shatter had been denied a fair hearing by Guerin and that his rights to natural and constitutional justice had been violated. In March 2017, the Court made a declaration in those terms. After the October 2016 judgement, the Guerin Report was removed from government websites. In July 2017, the Supreme Court agreed to hear an appeal by Guerin against the decision of the Court of Appeal. In February 2019 the Supreme Court dismissed Guerin’s appeal. In doing so it held that Guerin, under his appointment, was acting on behalf of the state and ruled that Guerin’s task was to conduct a preliminary inquiry and to identify any issues that should be subject to a sworn commission of investigation; that he had no mandate to pass judgement on anyone or to criticise Shatter and that he had violated Shatters constitutional rights and failed to afford Shatter a fair or any hearing. There was no response by the Irish Government or by any opposition politician to the judgement of the Supreme Court. Almost two years later in December 2020, Taoiseach Michael Martin, who had made allegations against Shatter in a press conference in Leinster House in February 2014 established as false by the O’Higgins Report, in a brief statement, informed the Dáil that as a consequence of the Supreme Court decision a revised version of the Guerin Report had been placed in the Oireachtas library with all criticism of Shatter redacted together with the Supreme Court judgements. He made no mention of Shatter’s exoneration by the O’Higgins Report in May 2016 and failed to apologise to Shatter for the wrong done to him. On the 12th July 2023 Taoiseach Leo Varadkar in another brief statement informed the Dail that "In May 2014 a report of the government established non-statutory inquiry- the Guerin Report-was published and was critical of Mr Shatter’s conduct as Minister for Justice and Equality. The government acknowledges that Alan Shatter’s conduct as a minister was subsequently vindicated by the O’Higgins Commission in its report which was published in May 2016. Moreover, in legal proceedings that culminated in a decision of the Supreme Court in February 2019, it was found that Mr Shatter had not been afforded fair procedures in the course of the inquiry. Certainly, in my view, Mr Shatter was not fairly treated by an organ of the state. I wish to acknowledge that in the chamber today”. (12 July 2023 Vol1042 Dail Debates.) As in December 2020, the statement omitted any apology to Shatter. Past precedent had established that a government acknowledgement that a person was wronged by an organ of the state was usually accompanied by an apology on behalf of the state. Both Martin and then Varadkar when making their statements led the Fine Gael, Fianna Fáil, Green coalition government that assumed office in the spring of 2020. Martin withheld agreement for the making of an apology.

Shatter contested the redrawn constituency of Dublin Rathdown at the 2016 general election. After the election he complained about a Fine Gael letter signed by Enda Kenny, as Taoiseach and leader of Fine Gael and Brian Hayes MEP, the party's Director of Elections distributed in parts of his constituency which gave the impression he was going to be easily re-elected and which directed Fine Gael voters to give their first preference vote to his Fine Gael colleague, Josepha Madigan. Madigan won the only Fine Gael seat in the three-seat constituency. Hayes later publicly apologised for the distribution of the letter but Kenny remained silent on the issue. Shatter also was critical of the conduct of Fine Gael’s national campaign and the role in it of Enda Kenny.

== Publications ==
- Family Law in the Republic of Ireland (1980), ISBN 0-905473-43-4
- Laura: A Novel You Will Never Forget (1989), ISBN 1-85371-042-3
- Ireland and the Palestine Question 1948–2004 (2005), ISBN 0-7165-2814-2 (foreword by Alan Shatter)
- Life is a Funny Business (2017), ISBN 978-178199-810-6, Poolbeg Press
- Frenzy and Betrayal: The Anatomy of a Political Assassination (2019), ISBN 9781785372377, Merrion Press
- Cyril's Lottery of Life (2023) ISBN 978-1-83952-694-7

Political offices
| Preceded by Brendan Smith as Minister for Justice and Law Reform | Minister for Justice and Equality; 2011–2014 | Succeeded by Frances Fitzgerald |
| Preceded by Éamon Ó Cuív | Minister for Defence; 2011–2014 | Succeeded by Enda Kenny (acting) |

| Dáil | Election | Deputy (Party) | Deputy (Party) | Deputy (Party) | Deputy (Party) | Deputy (Party) | Deputy (Party) | Deputy (Party) |
|---|---|---|---|---|---|---|---|---|
| 2nd | 1921 | Thomas Kelly (SF) | Daniel McCarthy (SF) | Constance Markievicz (SF) | Cathal Ó Murchadha (SF) | 4 seats 1921–1923 | | |
| 3rd | 1922 | Thomas Kelly (PT-SF) | Daniel McCarthy (PT-SF) | William O'Brien (Lab) | Myles Keogh (Ind.) | 4 seats 1921–1923 | | |
| 4th | 1923 | Philip Cosgrave (CnaG) | Daniel McCarthy (CnaG) | Constance Markievicz (Rep) | Myles Keogh (Ind.) | Cathal Ó Murchadha (Rep) | Michael Hayes (CnaG) | Peadar Doyle (CnaG) |
| 4th | 1923 by-election | Philip Cosgrave (CnaG) | Daniel McCarthy (CnaG) | Constance Markievicz (Rep) | Myles Keogh (Ind.) | Cathal Ó Murchadha (Rep) | Hugh Kennedy (CnaG) | Peadar Doyle (CnaG) |
| 4th | March 1924 by-election | James O'Mara (CnaG) | Daniel McCarthy (CnaG) | Constance Markievicz (Rep) | Myles Keogh (Ind.) | Cathal Ó Murchadha (Rep) | Hugh Kennedy (CnaG) | Peadar Doyle (CnaG) |
| 4th | November 1924 by-election | James O'Mara (CnaG) | Daniel McCarthy (CnaG) | Constance Markievicz (Rep) | Myles Keogh (Ind.) | Cathal Ó Murchadha (Rep) | Seán Lemass (SF) | Peadar Doyle (CnaG) |
| 4th | 1925 by-election | James O'Mara (CnaG) | Thomas Hennessy (CnaG) | Constance Markievicz (Rep) | Myles Keogh (Ind.) | Cathal Ó Murchadha (Rep) | Seán Lemass (SF) | Peadar Doyle (CnaG) |
| 5th | 1927 (Jun) | James Beckett (CnaG) | Vincent Rice (NL) | Constance Markievicz (FF) | Myles Keogh (Ind.) | Thomas Lawlor (Lab) | Seán Lemass (FF) | Peadar Doyle (CnaG) |
| 5th | 1927 by-election | James Beckett (CnaG) | Vincent Rice (NL) | Thomas Hennessy (CnaG) | Myles Keogh (Ind.) | Thomas Lawlor (Lab) | Seán Lemass (FF) | Peadar Doyle (CnaG) |
| 6th | 1927 (Sep) | James Beckett (CnaG) | Robert Briscoe (FF) | Thomas Hennessy (CnaG) | Myles Keogh (CnaG) | Frank Kerlin (FF) | Seán Lemass (FF) | Peadar Doyle (CnaG) |
| 7th | 1932 | James Beckett (CnaG) | Robert Briscoe (FF) | Thomas Hennessy (CnaG) | Myles Keogh (CnaG) | James Lynch (FF) | Seán Lemass (FF) | Peadar Doyle (CnaG) |
| 8th | 1933 | James Beckett (CnaG) | Robert Briscoe (FF) | James McGuire (CnaG) | Thomas Kelly (FF) | James Lynch (FF) | Seán Lemass (FF) | Peadar Doyle (CnaG) |
| 9th | 1937 | Myles Keogh (FG) | Robert Briscoe (FF) | Thomas Lawlor (Lab) | Thomas Kelly (FF) | Joseph Hannigan (Ind.) | Seán Lemass (FF) | Peadar Doyle (FG) |
| 10th | 1938 | James Beckett (FG) | Robert Briscoe (FF) | James Lynch (FF) | Thomas Kelly (FF) | Joseph Hannigan (Ind.) | Seán Lemass (FF) | Peadar Doyle (FG) |
| 10th | 1939 by-election | John McCann (FF) | Robert Briscoe (FF) | James Lynch (FF) | Thomas Kelly (FF) | Joseph Hannigan (Ind.) | Seán Lemass (FF) | Peadar Doyle (FG) |
| 11th | 1943 | Maurice Dockrell (FG) | Robert Briscoe (FF) | James Lynch (FF) | James Larkin Jnr (Lab) | John McCann (FF) | Seán Lemass (FF) | Peadar Doyle (FG) |
| 12th | 1944 | Maurice Dockrell (FG) | Robert Briscoe (FF) | James Lynch (FF) | James Larkin Jnr (Lab) | John McCann (FF) | Seán Lemass (FF) | Peadar Doyle (FG) |
| 13th | 1948 | Constituency abolished. See Dublin South-Central, Dublin South-East and Dublin South-West. | | | | | | |

| Dáil | Election | Deputy (Party) | Deputy (Party) | Deputy (Party) | Deputy (Party) | Deputy (Party) |
|---|---|---|---|---|---|---|
| 22nd | 1981 | Niall Andrews (FF) | Séamus Brennan (FF) | Nuala Fennell (FG) | John Kelly (FG) | Alan Shatter (FG) |
| 23rd | 1982 (Feb) | Niall Andrews (FF) | Séamus Brennan (FF) | Nuala Fennell (FG) | John Kelly (FG) | Alan Shatter (FG) |
| 24th | 1982 (Nov) | Niall Andrews (FF) | Séamus Brennan (FF) | Nuala Fennell (FG) | John Kelly (FG) | Alan Shatter (FG) |
| 25th | 1987 | Tom Kitt (FF) | Séamus Brennan (FF) | Anne Colley (PDs) | John Kelly (FG) | Alan Shatter (FG) |
| 26th | 1989 | Tom Kitt (FF) | Séamus Brennan (FF) | Nuala Fennell (FG) | Roger Garland (GP) | Alan Shatter (FG) |
| 27th | 1992 | Tom Kitt (FF) | Séamus Brennan (FF) | Liz O'Donnell (PDs) | Eithne FitzGerald (Lab) | Alan Shatter (FG) |
| 28th | 1997 | Tom Kitt (FF) | Séamus Brennan (FF) | Liz O'Donnell (PDs) | Olivia Mitchell (FG) | Alan Shatter (FG) |
| 29th | 2002 | Tom Kitt (FF) | Séamus Brennan (FF) | Liz O'Donnell (PDs) | Olivia Mitchell (FG) | Eamon Ryan (GP) |
| 30th | 2007 | Tom Kitt (FF) | Séamus Brennan (FF) | Alan Shatter (FG) | Olivia Mitchell (FG) | Eamon Ryan (GP) |
| 30th | 2009 by-election | Tom Kitt (FF) | George Lee (FG) | Alan Shatter (FG) | Olivia Mitchell (FG) | Eamon Ryan (GP) |
| 31st | 2011 | Shane Ross (Ind.) | Peter Mathews (FG) | Alan Shatter (FG) | Olivia Mitchell (FG) | Alex White (Lab) |
| 32nd | 2016 | Constituency abolished. See Dublin Rathdown, Dublin South-West and Dún Laoghaire. | | | | |
