= Democracy in India =

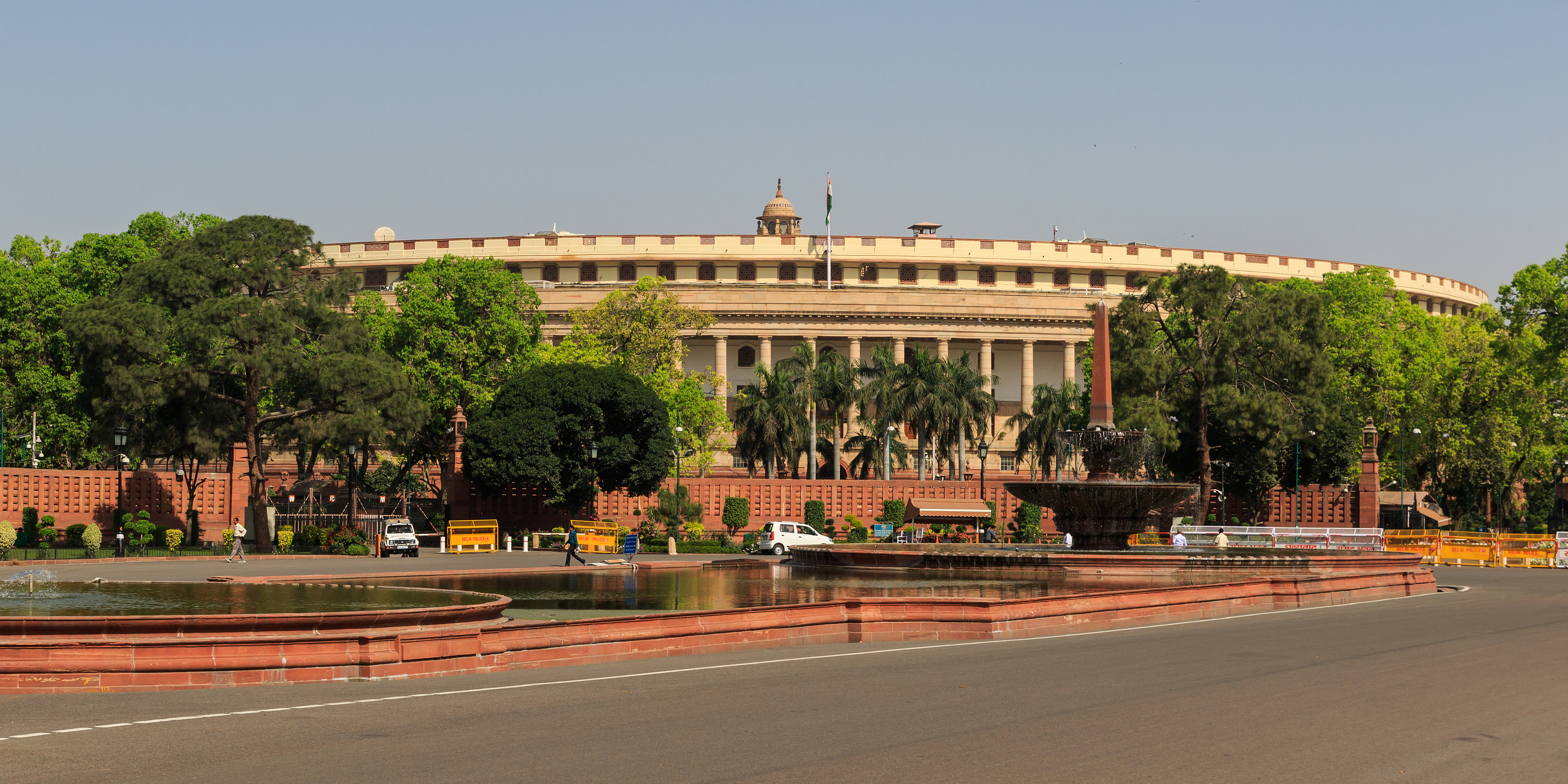
Constructed in 1927 as the seat of the Imperial Legislative Council of India, the Old Parliament House served as the home of the Indian Parliament from 1947 until 2023, when the New Parliament House was opened.

India is considered to be the world's most populous democracy. Elections in the country started with the 1951–52 Indian general election. India was among the first post-colonial nations to adopt universal adult suffrage, granting all adult citizens equal voting rights.

In recent years, under the premiership of Narendra Modi, India has experienced significant democratic backsliding. The Economist Democracy Index classifies India as a flawed democracy. Freedom House classifies India as partly free.

== History ==
=== Pre-modern history ===
Early Shakyas, Koliyas, Mallakas, and Licchavis are recorded as having assemblies that were accessible to affluent men of certain social classes. Other saṅghas and gaṇas had councils of unelected nobles; these bodies did not conform to modern standards of democracy and functioned more similarly to elite oligarchic councils. The Greek historian Diodorus, writing approximately two centuries after the time of Alexander the Great, refers to democratic states in India. However, there is a lack of evidence for electoral processes, and the term "democracy" in the 3rd century BCE may have referred more broadly to autonomous polities rather than representative governance. In the 10th century CE, inscriptions at the Vaikunda Perumal Temple suggest the election of local representatives to village councils during the Chola Empire.

=== Independence from colonial rule ===
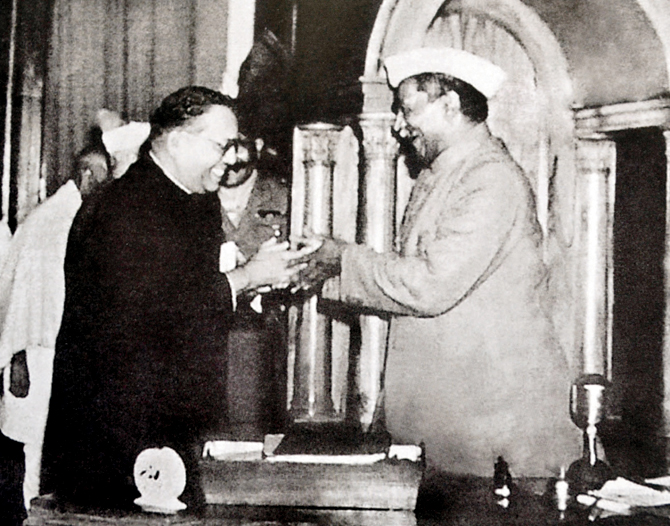
B. R. Ambedkar presenting the final draft of the Constitution of India to Rajendra Prasad in November 1949

Following nearly two centuries of British colonial rule, initially under the East India Company and later under direct governance by the British Crown, India gained independence in 1947 after a sustained nationalist anti-colonial movement. This movement was predominantly led by the Indian National Congress (INC; also known simply as the "Congress") and prominent figures such as Mahatma Gandhi and Jawaharlal Nehru. However, the movement was also shaped by a diverse range of ideological influences, including communism and Dalit leaders. Prominent figures associated with these currents included B. R. Ambedkar, a leading advocate for the abolition of the caste system, and Subhas Chandra Bose, a militant nationalist leader, allied with the Axis Powers in World War II. The independence process was marred by a surge of religious and communal divisions, culminating in a bloody partition of the Indian subcontinent in 1947. This division created two separate nations: Pakistan with a Muslim majority, and India with a Hindu majority. The partition was characterised by widespread violence, mass displacement, and one of the largest refugee crises in history. India formally became a sovereign, democratic republic in 1950 with the adoption of the world's longest written constitution. The constitution was drafted by a Constituent Assembly, chaired by Ambedkar. The country held its first general election between late 1951 and early 1952, implementing universal adult suffrage, and drawing heavy inspiration from the Westminster parliamentary system. The Congress secured a decisive electoral victory and Nehru was elected as the first prime minister of the country. This established India as the world's largest liberal democracy.

=== Nehruvian era ===
After independence, the Congress emerged as India's dominant political party. The reorganization of Indian states in 1956 along linguistic lines—transforming the colonial-era presidencies and provinces and fully integrating over 500 princely states—both responded to and further fueled the rise of notable regional movements. Congress secured a decisive victory in the 1957 general election. Notably, 1957 also witnessed a landmark development in the state of Kerala, where the Communist Party of India (CPI), under the leadership of E. M. S. Namboodiripad, formed the government—marking one of the first democratically elected communist governments in the world. The Congress maintained its political dominance by winning the 1962 general election in another landslide. Nehru remains the longest-serving holder of the office of the prime minister, having led the country for sixteen years. Nehru's premiership embraced republicanism, secularism, social democracy, and a policy of non-alignment during the Cold War. The caste system persisted, despite the constitutional abolition of caste-based discrimination. At the same time, the Congress developed into an increasingly clientelist organisation. Socialist government regulations expanded significantly in what became known as the Licence Raj. However, these regulations often favoured established industrialists and large corporations, while disadvantaging small businesses, thereby contributing to the consolidation of capitalism. Nehru's leadership is considered to have failed in satisfying the urban and rural poor, the unemployed, and the Hindu nationalists and fundamentalists. Nehru died in 1964 and was succeeded as prime minister by Lal Bahadur Shastri. Shastri's untimely death just two years later, in 1966, led to his succession by Nehru's daughter, Indira Gandhi, India's first and only female prime minister. Nehru is often regarded as the architect of modern India.

=== Indira Gandhi and the Emergency ===
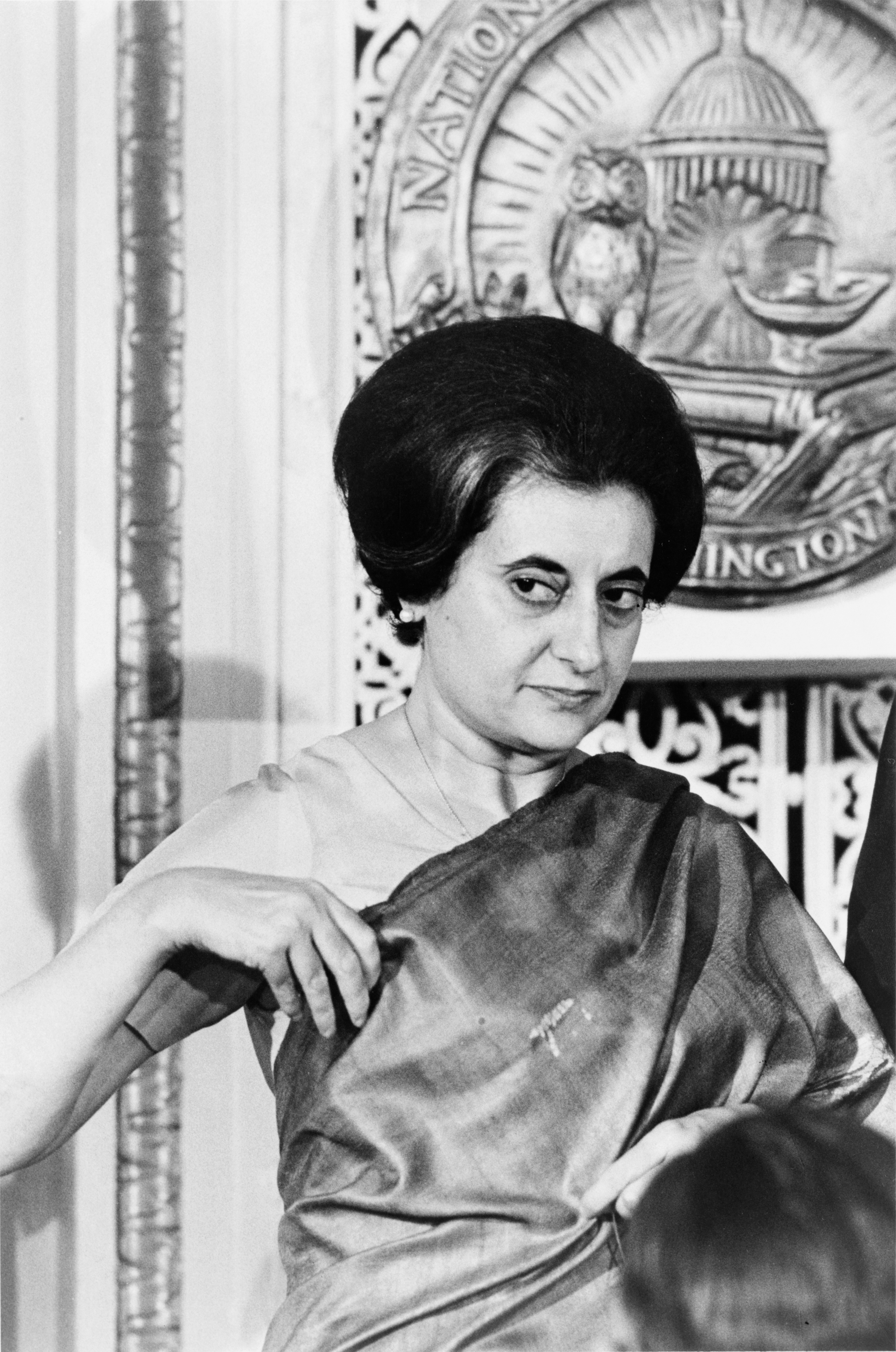
Indira Gandhi in 1966

In response to a decline in support for Congress in the 1967 general election, Indira Gandhi embraced an increasingly populist platform. This led to opposition from the party's right-wing, ultimately causing Congress to split in 1969 into the conservative and anti-socialist Congress (O), and the Gandhi-led socialist Congress (R). Gandhi's Congress (R) won a landslide victory in the 1971 general election. She is credited to have centralised power, and her political base has been described as to be a cult of personality. Though many praised her for her state socialism and protectionism, others criticised her alleged Machiavellianism and perceived insincerity regarding her socialist stance. (Note: Sources: Rosser, John (2004). Comparative Economics in a Transforming World Economy. MIT Press. ISBN 9780262182348.; Malik, Yogendra (1988). India: The Years of Indira Gandhi. Brill Publishers. ISBN 978-90-04-08681-4.; Jaffrelot, Christophe (2003). India's Silent Revolution: The Rise of the Lower Castes in North India. C. Hurst & Co. ISBN 9781850653981.; The Indian Libertarian. University of Virginia. 1965.)

Meanwhile, in 1967, an armed peasant revolt erupted in the village of Naxalbari in the state of West Bengal, led by tribals and radical Maoist-inspired communists. This event, known as the Naxalbari uprising, marked the inception of the Naxalite–Maoist insurgency, a people's war that has persisted for decades.

Rising economic turmoil led to an increase in civil unrest. Gandhi's increasing control over the judiciary, alongside undermining and bypassing of court rulings, sparked multiple constitutional crises. In 1974, a wave of student-led protests in the state of Bihar, initially sparked by inflation, unemployment, and corruption, rapidly escalated into a broader movement of mass resistance, demanding systemic transformation and directly challenging Gandhi's authority. Known as the Bihar Movement, it was led by socialist leader Jayaprakash Narayan, who called for a "total revolution". On 12 June 1975, the Allahabad High Court found Gandhi guilty of electoral malpractice in the Raj Narain verdict. In the face of massive political opposition, disorder, and dissent across the country, Gandhi enacted a state of emergency. The Emergency began on 25 June 1975 and saw unprecedented nationwide censorship, mass arrests of dissenters and political opponents, widespread forced sterilisation, the suspension of the constitution, the nullification of fundamental rights, and a dictatorial centralisation of power. In 1977, Gandhi called for fresh elections, which resulted in a historic landslide victory for the Janata Party, a broad anti-Congress coalition. Janata Party leader Morarji Desai subsequently became the country's first non-Congress prime minister.

=== Post-Emergency era ===
The Desai Premiership ended the state of emergency and amended the constitution to make it more difficult for the government to declare emergencies. Desai's economic policies were met with little success. Significant ideological and political divisions eroded the Janata government. In 1979, Desai resigned and Charan Singh was appointed prime minister. Singh himself resigned just months later. In the 1980 election, Congress resurged, facilitating Indira Gandhi's return to power. Gandhi was assassination in 1984 by her Sikh bodyguards in the aftermath of Operation Blue Star, a deeply controversial military action in the Golden Temple, a sacred site in Sikhism, in an attempt to crack down on Sikh separatists. Her followers reacted by conducting a series of nationwide anti-Sikh pogroms, leading to the deaths of thousands. Indira Gandhi's son, Rajiv Gandhi, succeeded her as prime minister, with the Nehru–Gandhi family evolving into a political dynasty. The Congress government faced criticism for its handling of the anti-Sikh violence. Many accused the party of complicity, failing to bring the majority of perpetrators to justice, and allegedly providing state support or engaging in cover-ups. (Note: Sources: Jeffery, Renée (2020). "Post-Conflict Justice in Divided Democracies: The 1984 Anti-Sikh Riots in India". Third World Quarterly. 41 (6): 994–1011. doi:10.1080/01436597.2020.1728686. hdl:10072/392194.; "India: No Justice for 1984 Anti-Sikh Bloodshed". Human Rights Watch. 29 October 2014. Archived from the original on 29 October 2014.; Bal, Hartosh Singh (1 October 2014). "Sins of Commission: How nine official inquiries obscured the truth of the 1984 anti-Sikh violence". The Caravan. Archived from the original on 4 October 2014.; Agal, Renu (11 August 2005). "Justice delayed, justice denied". BBC. Archived from the original on 17 November 2005.) The events of 1984 contributed to the intensification of the Punjab insurgency, a Sikh separatist movement that escalated into a decade-long armed conflict in Punjab, the state with the largest Sikh population.

=== Rise of coalition politics, Hindutva, and economic liberalisation ===
Rajiv Gandhi won a landslide victory in the 1984 election. At the age of 40, he became India's youngest prime minister. His tenure saw a shift towards economic deregulation. The Congress was defeated in 1989, and V. P. Singh of the Janata Dal coalition assumed office. His implementation of the Mandal Commission report, expanding reservations for lower caste Hindus, sparked significant social and political unrest. The 1990s also marked the ascent of Hindutva in Indian politics, with the demolition of the Babri Masjid. Following Singh's ousting through a motion of no confidence, Chandra Shekhar briefly served as prime minister before resigning in 1991. With the 1991 election, the Congress returned to power under P. V. Narasimha Rao, whose government initiated sweeping economic liberalisation amidst a severe balance of payments crisis. The Congress lost the 1996 election. Atal Bihari Vajpayee of the Bharatiya Janata Party (BJP), closely affiliated with the right-wing Hindutva paramilitary organisation Rashtriya Swayamsevak Sangh (RSS), briefly became prime minister but his government fell within days. Two successive United Front coalition governments under H. D. Deve Gowda and Inder Kumar Gujral followed, both short-lived due to political instability. Vajpayee returned to power in 1998, and after another brief collapse, led the BJP-organised National Democratic Alliance (NDA) coalition to victory in the 1999 election. He became the first non-Congress prime minister to complete a full term. His government conducted successful nuclear weapons tests in 1998, continued economic liberalisation, and improved diplomatic relations with the United States. Dependent on coalition support and led by the moderate Vajpayee, the BJP was unable to advance key ideological goals, which sowed dissent among hardliners within the party. In 2002, a series of widespread anti-Muslim pogroms across Gujarat, led to the deaths of over a thousand people. The state government, led by chief minister Narendra Modi, is considered complicit in the riots, and he has faced serious accusations of state-sponsored terrorism. (Note: Sources: Ghassem-Fachandi, Parvis (2012). Pogrom in Gujarat: Hindu Nationalism and Anti-Muslim Violence in India. Princeton University Press. ISBN 9780691151779.; Jackson, Richard; Murphy, Eamon; Poynting, Scott (2009). Contemporary State Terrorism: Theory and Practice. Routledge. ISBN 9781135245160.; Pandey, Gyanendra (2006). Routine Violence: Nations, Fragments, Histories. Stanford University Press. ISBN 9780804752640.; Strozier, Charles B.; Terman, David M.; Jones, James W.; Boyd, Katherine A. (2010). The Fundamentalist Mindset: Psychological Perspectives on Religion, Violence, and History. Oxford University Press. ISBN 9780199702022.)

=== UPA coalition governance ===
The 2004 general election resulted in the Congress returning to power, leading the United Progressive Alliance (UPA), a coalition of centrist and centre-left parties. Following the election, Manmohan Singh assumed office as the first Sikh and non-Hindu prime minister. Singh continued the process of economic liberalisation and is widely credited with contributing to a period of sustained economic growth in India. His administration's handling of the Great Recession enabled the country to navigate the economic downturn more effectively than many other nations. He sought reconciliation with Pakistan and deepened ties with the United States. Singh secured a second term following the UPA's victory in the 2009 general election. His government became increasingly associated with corruption, as it was implicated in several high-profile scandals. The constraints of coalition politics contributed to what was widely perceived by the public as policy paralysis, although some contended that this perception was exaggerated or manufactured. Despite robust economic growth, increases in economic inequality and unemployment also took place. His later administration witnessed public disillusionment and a decline in popular support. Meanwhile, Hindutva continued rising in the country, with many attributing the perceived failures of Singh's administration as a significant contributing factor. The clearance of Narendra Modi for the 2002 Gujarat riots, by a special panel of India's Supreme Court in 2012, led to anger and disbelief among the country's Muslim communities. In the 2014 general election, the BJP, led by Modi, adopted a right-wing populist platform. The party achieved a historic landslide victory, marking the first occasion since 1984 that a single party secured an outright majority in the parliament. The election was seen as the end of the dominance of the Congress in India's political landscape.

=== Modi era ===
Upon his inauguration, Narendra Modi became the first prime minister of India to be born after the country's independence. His first term primarily focused on reducing bureaucratic red tape, implementing extensive economic liberalisation, and overhauling the economic system. These initiatives were accompanied by an expansion of certain government handouts, even as welfare programmes and government spending were scaled back. These policies continued into his successive terms. In the 2019 general election, he secured another landslide victory.

Modi's second term witnessed a pronounced ideological shift towards Hindutva. He has been widely credited with engineering a shift in India to right-wing politics, contributing to the state-backed mainstreaming of Hindutva, previously considered to be on the political fringe. (Note: Sources: Hansen, Thomas Blom; Roy, Srirupa (2022). Saffron Republic: Hindu Nationalism and State Power in India. Cambridge University Press. ISBN 9781009100489.; Komireddi, K. S. (2024). Malevolent Republic: A Short History of the New India. C. Hurst & Co. ISBN 9781805261780.; Varshney, Ashutosh; Staggs, Connor (2024). "Hindu Nationalism and the New Jim Crow". Journal of Democracy. 35. Johns Hopkins University Press: 5–18. doi:10.1353/jod.2024.a915345.; Pathi, Krutika; Saaliq, Sheikh (19 April 2024). "Once a fringe Indian ideology, Hindu nationalism is now mainstream, thanks to Modi's decade in power". Associated Press. Archived from the original on 18 April 2024.; Singh, Amit (7 August 2023). "Has the Hindu majority developed a 'Nazi conscience' in India?". European Consortium for Political Research. Archived from the original on 27 September 2023.; George, Cherian (28 February 2022). "The Rise of Hindu Nationalism". Hindutva Watch. Archived from the original on 1 March 2022.) High levels of economic growth and development have coincided with an intensification of economic inequality, reaching levels surpassing those observed during the colonial era. This has been described by many scholars, academics, and experts as "Billionaire Raj" or India's Gilded Age, and is generally considered to be a crystallisation of trends that had emerged in the 1990s. The administration has faced criticism for allegedly fostering crony capitalism. (Note: Sources: Crabtree, James (2018). The Billionaire Raj: A Journey Through India's New Gilded Age. Oneworld Publications. ISBN 9781786073808.; Tillin, Louise (7 May 2024). "The political economy of populism in India". King's College London. Archived from the original on 17 June 2024.; Bharti, Nitin Kumar; Chancel, Lucas; Piketty, Thomas; Somanchi, Anmol (18 March 2024). "Income and Wealth Inequality in India, 1922-2023: The Rise of the Billionaire Raj" (PDF). World Inequality Database. Archived from the original (PDF) on 14 June 2024.; Kamble, Kapil S (20 May 2023). "The Anatomy of Crony Capitalism in India". Economic and Political Weekly. Archived from the original on 23 May 2023.; Sharma, Yashraj (29 April 2024). "Is today's India more unequal than under British rule?". Al Jazeera Media Network. Archived from the original on 29 April 2024.) Modi's government was criticised for mishandling the COVID-19 pandemic. Furthermore, the pandemic contributed to a broader cost-of-living crisis that persisted beyond its conclusion.

Throughout his tenure, many observers have noted a significant and sustained decline in democratic norms in India. The Modi government has employed state power to suppress dissent across various sectors, including the arts, academia, journalism, and the political opposition, while also leading to an increasingly right-wing and pro-government mainstream media. (Note: Sources: Agarwala, Rina (2025). "The Perils and Promises of Unequal Democracy: Insights from the Sociology of India". Annual Review of Sociology. 51: 485–505. doi:10.1146/annurev-soc-090324-022910.; Widmalm, Sten (2021). Routledge Handbook of Autocratization in South Asia. Routledge. ISBN 9781000486629.; Brunkert, Lennart; Kruse, Stefan; Welzel, Christian (3 April 2019). "A tale of culture-bound regime evolution: the centennial democratic trend and its recent reversal". Democratization. 26 (3): 422–443. doi:10.1080/13510347.2018.1542430. ISSN 1351-0347. S2CID 148625260. Archived from the original on 10 October 2021.; Khaitan, Tarunabh (26 May 2020). "Killing a Constitution with a Thousand Cuts: Executive Aggrandizement and Party-state Fusion in India". Law & Ethics of Human Rights. 14 (1): 49–95. doi:10.1515/lehr-2020-2009. hdl:11343/241852. ISSN 2194-6531. S2CID 221083830.; Blank, Jonah (8 August 2019). "India Just Put Democracy at Risk Across South Asia". The Atlantic. Archived from the original on 8 August 2019.; Biswas, Soutik (16 March 2021). "'Electoral autocracy': The downgrading of India's democracy". BBC. Archived from the original on 20 April 2021.; Ganguly, Sumit (18 September 2020). "India's Democracy Is Under Threat". Foreign Policy. Archived from the original on 20 September 2020.; Ara, Ismat (9 December 2020). "At Farmers' Protest, Field Reporters of 'Godi Media' Channels Face the Heat". The Wire (India). Archived from the original on 27 November 2022.) His political base has been compared to a cult of personality. In the 2024 general election, the BJP lost its parliamentary majority and now leads an NDA coalition government. The result coincided with a global anti-incumbency wave and a resurgence of the opposition, led by the Congress party—though gains were largely driven by regional parties rather than a full revival of the Congress.

== Structure ==
=== Constitution ===
The constitution of India is the supreme legal document of the country and the longest written national constitution in the world. It declares India to be a sovereign, socialist, secular, and democratic republic. It establishes the framework that defines the fundamental political code, structure, procedures, powers, and duties of government institutions. It also sets out fundamental rights, directive principles, and the duties of citizens. The day of adoption of the constitution is celebrated every year on 26 January as Republic Day.

=== Legislature ===
==== Central/Union legislature ====
The parliament of India is the country's supreme legislative body and follows a bicameral structure comprising the Rajya Sabha (Council of States) and the Lok Sabha (House of the People). The president of India, who serves as the ceremonial head of state, is also a formal component of the legislature. The president is elected to a five-year term by an electoral college comprising the elected members of both houses of parliament, as well as elected members of state legislatures. Parliament House in New Delhi is the seat of India's parliament, housing both the Lok Sabha and the Rajya Sabha.

===== Lok Sabha =====
The Lok Sabha, also known as the House of the People, is the lower house of the parliament. Its members are directly elected by Indian citizens through universal adult franchise, representing parliamentary constituencies across the country under a first-past-the-post electoral system. General elections are held once every five years, although early elections may be called if the house is dissolved by the president on the advice of the prime minister and the council of ministers. During a state of emergency, the term of the Lok Sabha may be extended beyond five years. The Lok Sabha is the principal centre of legislative authority in India, where major national laws are introduced, debated, and passed; the executive branch is primarily responsible and accountable to this house. The prime minister typically serves as the leader of the house in Lok Sabha, and the ruling party or coalition largely drives the legislative agenda.

A motion of no confidence is a formal proposal in the Lok Sabha asserting that the ruling government no longer has the support of the majority of the house; if passed, it obliges the entire government to resign.

The current Lok Sabha, the eighteenth since independence, comprises 543 seats, all filled by members of parliament elected in the 2024 Indian general election.

===== Rajya Sabha =====
The Rajya Sabha, also known as the Council of States, is the upper house of the parliament. It currently has 245 seats. Its members are elected by the members of the state legislative assemblies through a system of proportional representation, by means of a single transferable vote. Members serve staggered six-year terms, with one-third of the house being elected every two years. In addition, twelve members are nominated directly by the president, in recognition of their distinguished contributions to fields such as the arts and the sciences.

While the Rajya Sabha has the constitutional authority to introduce, debate, and pass most categories of national legislation—with the sole exception of money bills, which fall exclusively within the domain of the Lok Sabha—it primarily functions as a revisory chamber and rarely obstructs significant legislation approved by the lower house. Nevertheless, on occasion, it has exercised its powers to delay or seek amendments to major legislative proposals passed by the Lok Sabha.

==== State legislature ====
The state legislature of India consists of the state legislative assemblies and the state legislative councils. While the majority of Indian states and union territories function under a unicameral legislature, six states maintain a bicameral system, with the state legislative councils serving as the upper house. Notably, money bills fall exclusively within the jurisdiction of the state legislative assemblies. In the event of a disagreement between the two houses of the state legislature, the decision of the state legislative assembly prevails.

===== State legislative assembly =====
The state legislative assembly, also known as the Vidhan Sabha or the Saasana Sabha, is the legislative body that functions as the unicameral legislature in twenty-two states and all union territories of India. In six states, it serves as the lower house of a bicameral legislature. Members of the legislative assemby are directly elected by the electorate of individual constituencies through general elections held every five years, unless dissolved sooner by the governor on the advice of the chief minister. State legislative assemblies are the locus of legislative authority in their specific states or union territories. Analogous to the Lok Sabha at the national level, a motion of no confidence may be introduced and passed within a state legislative assembly; if successful, the incumbent state government is obliged to resign.

===== State legislative council =====
The state legislative council, also known as the Vidhan Parishad or the Saasana Mandali, functions as the upper house in the bicameral legislature of select Indian states. A state legislative assembly may pass a resolution by a special majority to establish or dissolve the council. Members of a state legislative council serve staggered terms of six years, with one-third of the members retiring every two years. The composition of the council reflects a blend of indirect election and nomination, designed to represent various interest groups and areas of expertise. Although the state legislative council performs a reviewing and advisory role, it holds limited legislative power. As of now, six Indian states possess such councils: Andhra Pradesh, Bihar, Karnataka, Maharashtra, Telangana, and Uttar Pradesh.

=== Reservation ===
Reservation is a form of affirmative action that was established during the British Raj. It reserves seats for "socially and economically backward" castes and communities, in higher education admissions, public sector employment, and political bodies, for adequate representation.

== Democratic backsliding ==
=== Under Narendra Modi ===
Numerous media outlets and academic scholars have extensively documented the democratic backsliding seen in India under the premiership of Narendra Modi.

Laws on sedition, defamation, and counterterrorism, as well as harassment and raids by tax officers, have been used to silence critics and dissenting voices. Organisations such as the Enforcement Directorate and the Central Bureau of Investigation have been used to attack the opposition. The Modi administration has delayed, suppressed, and withheld official government data, such as those related to unemployment, mob lynchings, and farmer suicides, among others.

India's "referee institutions", such as the judiciary, investigative agencies, the Election Commission of India (ECI), the Central Information Commission (CIC), Lokpal, among others have been significantly weakened due to coercion and deference, patronage and interference, as well as neglect and institutional deprivation. Ideological alignment with the BJP, career incentives, and public opinion pressures, have caused and worsened institutional weakening. This has coincided with the erosion of public trust in institutions and democratic foundations like the rule of law. The 2025 Indian electoral controversy and 2026 Indian electoral controversy emerged due to alleged electoral fraud and the collusion of the ECI with the ruling BJP.

Internet censorship has worsened, with a significant rise in the banning and blocking of websites, apps, and accounts on social media, alongside the suppression of online information, which are considered to be critical of the government. Furthermore, throughout Modi's tenure as prime minister, the Indian media landscape has shifted markedly towards a right-wing and pro-government orientation. This alignment has sometimes been pejoratively referred to as 'Godi media', a term used to criticise perceived media subservience to the ruling establishment.

In 2021, the V-Dem Institute downgraded India from 'flawed democracy' to 'electoral autocracy'. In a 2023 report, the institute characterised India as "one of the worst autocratisers in the last 10 years." In 2024, India was ranked as the 19th most electorally democratic country in Asia, amid a process of democratic backsliding, according to the V-Dem Democracy indices. In 2023, India was ranked 161 out of 180 countries in the World Press Freedom Index, published by Reporters Without Borders. The Democracy Index, published by the Economist Group, classifies India as a 'flawed democracy'. The Freedom House classifies India as 'partly free'.

== See also ==
- Elections in India
- Politics of India
- Democratic backsliding
