= 2026 Irish fuel protests =

Series of nationwide demonstrations in the Republic of Ireland

- Part of the 2026 Iran war fuel crisis and protests against the 2026 Iran war
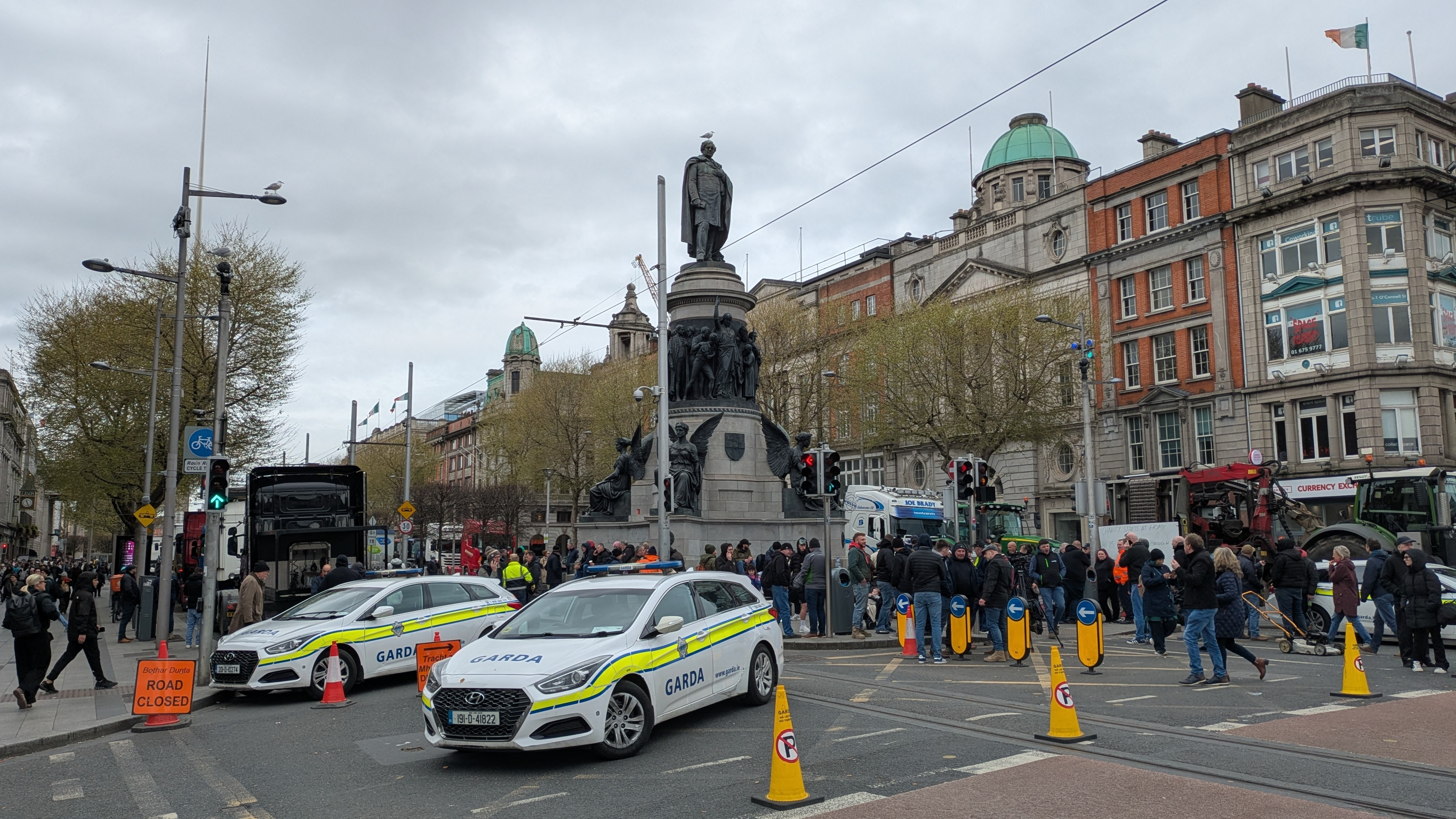
- Blockaded intersection of R105 and O'Connell Street Lower in Dublin City Centre during the protests
- Date: Initial phase: 7–14 April 2026; Subsequent protests: 14 April 2026 - present
- Location: Republic of Ireland; Northern Ireland
- Caused by: Increasing fuel prices due to Iran war; Cost-of-living crisis
- Goals: Fuel price cap, suspension of carbon taxes and broader government intervention; Removal of Micheál Martin as Taoiseach
- Methods: Convoys, road blockades, depot and refinery obstruction
- Status: Ongoing: Government announces €505 million support package for affected industries and cuts excise on petrol and diesel until July 2026; Resignation of Michael Healy-Rae as a Minister of State; Most blockades cleared by 12 April with sporadic protests continuing

Parties
Fuel protesters	(Republic of Ireland) Government of Ireland: Garda Síochána; Public Order Units; Irish Army (recovery vehicles only); (United Kingdom) Government of Northern Ireland

Lead figures
Non-centralised leadership Prominent individuals: John Dallon; James Geoghegan; Christopher Duffy	Micheál Martin; Simon Harris; Jim O'Callaghan; Justin Kelly

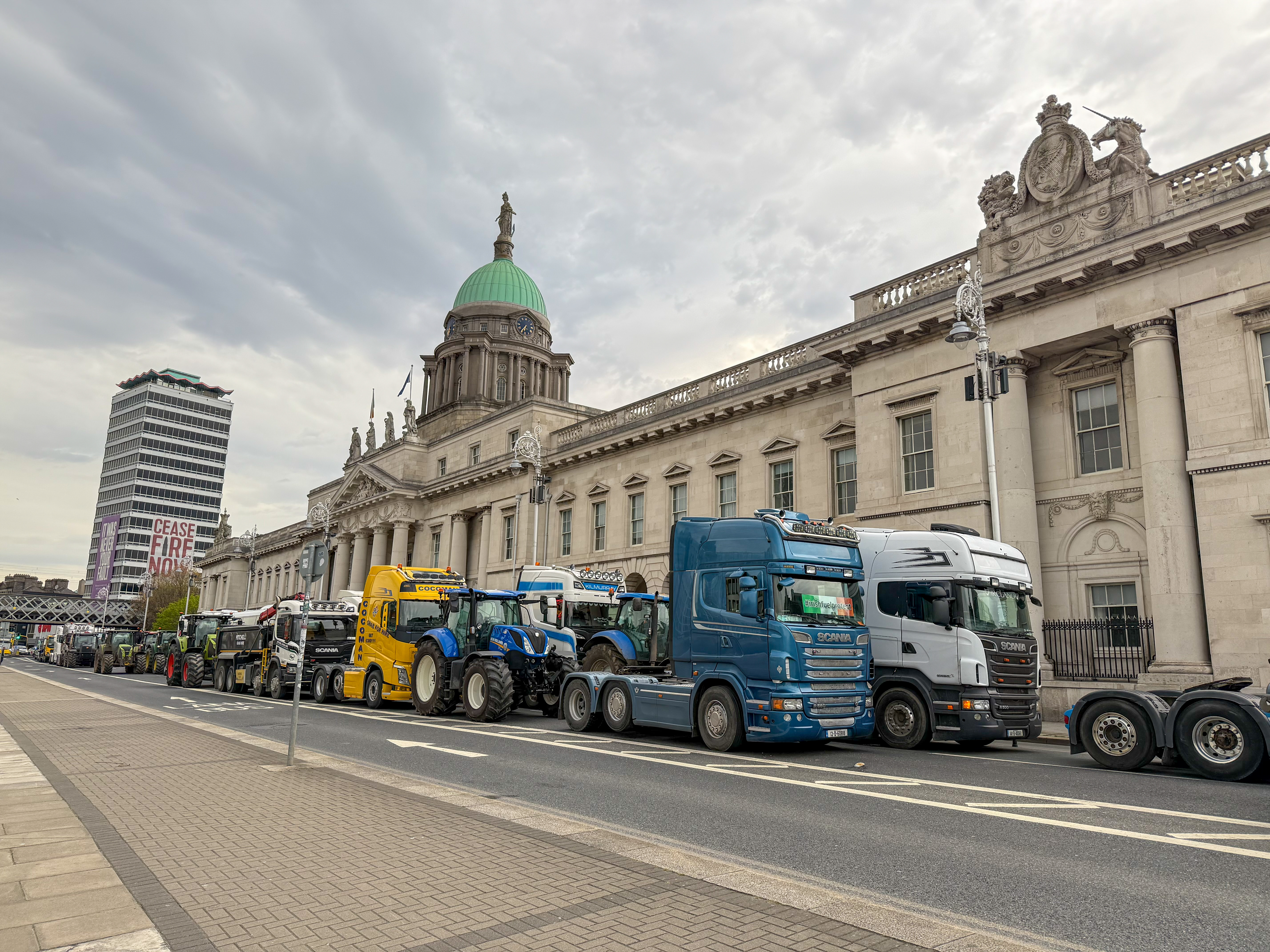
Irish fuel protests in Dublin, trucks and tractors at the Custom House

A series of nationwide protests occurred from 7–14 April in the Republic of Ireland and Northern Ireland in response to rapidly rising fuel prices and broader cost-of-living pressures. The protests, primarily led by farmers, hauliers, and transport-dependent workers, caused widespread disruption to transport networks, fuel supply chains, and economic activity across the country.

Following the Irish government's initial response to the protests, Sinn Féin tabled a motion of no confidence in the incumbent government, a coalition primarily composed of Fianna Fáil and Fine Gael. The government responded with a motion of confidence, which it won by 92 votes to 78.

== Background ==
The protests emerged amid a global fuel crisis during the 2026 Iran war, particularly due to the Strait of Hormuz crisis. Between the start of the war and the onset of protests, Irish diesel prices increased by approximately 28% and petrol prices by 25%.

Petrol and diesel are highly taxed in Ireland (with the exception of "green diesel", also known as Low Sulphur Gas Oil, Agri Diesel, Marked Gas Oil, MGO, or 35 Second Oil, which is exclusively reserved for agricultural and haulier vehicles), with taxes accounting for approximately 57% of petrol and 48% of diesel prices as of April 2026, according to AA Ireland, contributing to protesters' demands for reduced fuel taxes.

In March 2026, the Irish government introduced a €250 million package which reduced petrol and diesel prices by €0.15 and €0.20 per litre, respectively. However, many workers in agriculture, construction and logistics argued that these measures were insufficient to rising operating costs.

During meetings around the country in late March, farmers, hauliers and agricultural contractors expressed frustration with rising fuel costs. Organisation moved online, with a Facebook page called "The People of Ireland Against Fuel Prices" (Note: Originally "Irish Truckers and Haulage Association Against Fuel Prices") running a paid advertisement encouraging attendance and directing people to local WhatsApp groups. The page grew to more than 60,000 followers.

Grassroots organisations played a key role in mobilising the protests, with groups coordinating convoys and demonstrations through social media platforms.

=== Far-right involvement in protests ===
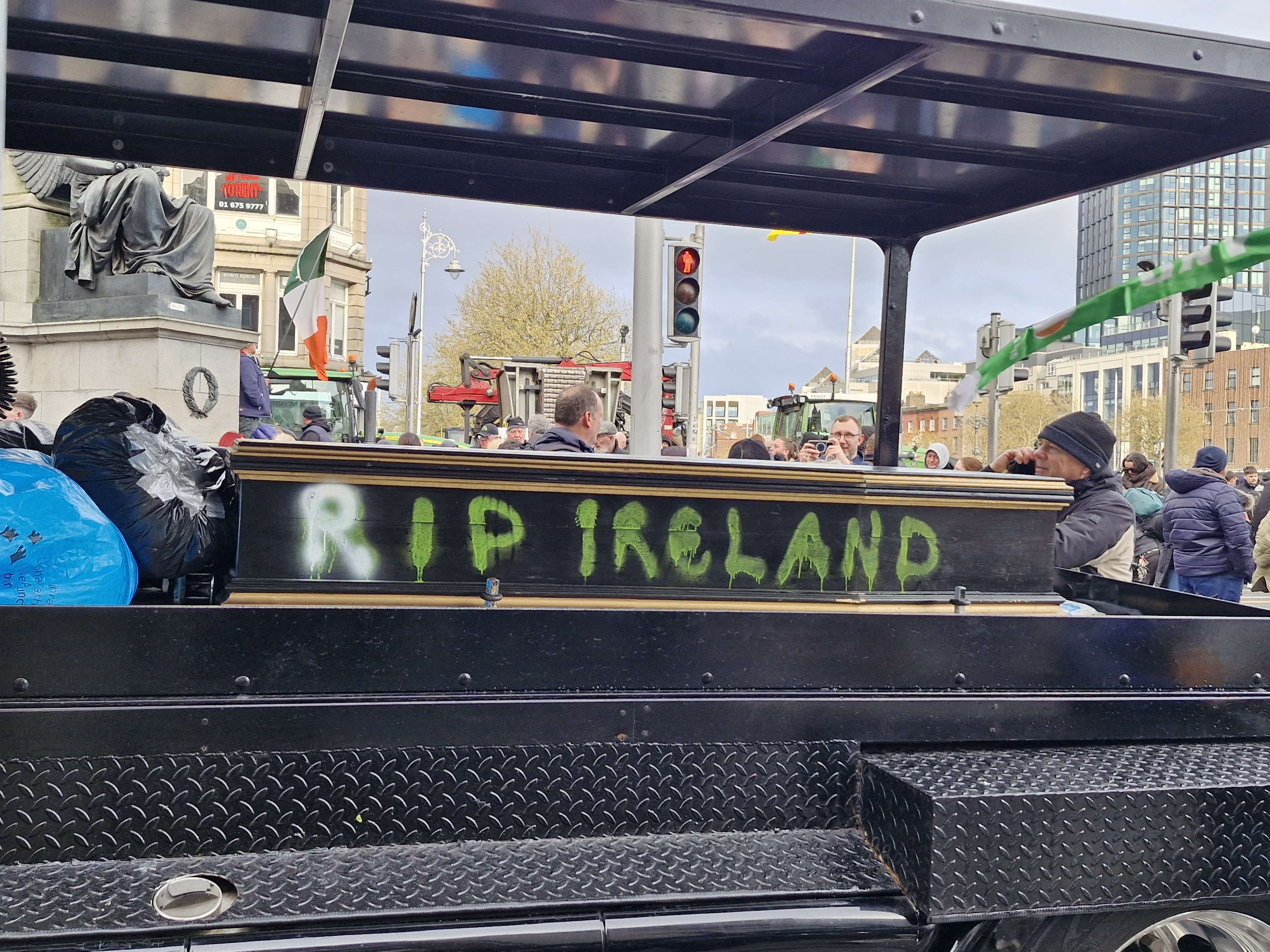
Coffin with the words 'RIP IRELAND' spray painted on it in Dublin

On 11 April 2026, TheJournal.ie and The Irish Times reported that Ireland's far-right movement became enmeshed in the fuel protests from an early stage, though the protests were not far-right in origin.

Facebook page "The People of Ireland Against Fuel Prices", which has been particularly active in organising demonstrations, is run by Kildare tow-truck operator Sonny Boyd. He had regularly posted anti-immigrant content on his personal Facebook page.

Three men emerged as spokespeople for the protests: James Geoghegan, an agricultural contractor from Westmeath; Christopher Duffy, an agricultural contractor from Meath; and John Dollan, a farmer and contractor from Kildare. Duffy, who gave numerous media interviews once the protests began, had a documented history of inflammatory statements, including a post in which he expressed indifference to violence and rape if its used against climate activist Greta Thunberg. Both Duffy and Dollan appeared multiple times on livestreams hosted by Niall McConnell, a far-right and anti-immigration agitator. Geoghegan also appeared in a livestream with anti-immigration agitator Philip Dwyer.

Far-right figures, including Kildare county councillor Tom McDonnell and Dublin city councillor Gavin Pepper, attached themselves to the protests in person. However, the far-right was not universally welcomed: those attempting to redirect conversations toward immigration were removed from organising WhatsApp groups in several instances, and the Irish Road Haulage Association cited concerns about "some of the individuals involved" as a reason for keeping its distance.

The involvement of international figures escalated matters from around 9 April. British activist Tommy Robinson began posting about the protests after Justice Minister Jim O'Callaghan sought Defence Forces assistance to clear blockades, accusing the Irish government of "high treason" and being "at war with the Irish people". Commentator Katie Hopkins and Canadian activist Ezra Levant, who travelled to Ireland, also amplified the movement. Conor McGregor, following a period of relative quiet since his unsuccessful presidential bid, also used the protests to revive anti-immigrant campaigning on social media.

While attempting to join a protest on 8 April, People Before Profit TD Paul Murphy was accosted by protesters angrily chanting "shame on you", with one woman shouting "What is a woman?" at him. In speaking with The Journal about the experience, Murphy noted, "All those people who were aggressive towards us are all people I know. They’re all known far-right agitators in Dublin".

== Protests ==
Sites of major protests and blockades

=== Initial demonstrations ===
The first major protests began on 7 April 2026, when convoys of tractors, trucks and other vehicles created blockades in several parts of the country, blocking most notably the M50 motorway in Dublin, both sides of O'Connell Street in Dublin city centre, and others such as the M7 bypasses in both Limerick and Portlaoise, and the Galway docks.

Large scale disruption was reported nationwide, with major delays on motorways and widespread interruptions to public transport services including Dublin Bus and the Luas.

=== Escalation ===
By 8–9 April, protests had intensified considerably, with demonstrators blocking fuel depots in counties Galway, Limerick and Cork. Of particular importance, the Whitegate oil refinery, the only oil refinery in all of the State, had been blocked. Convoys and stationary blockades led to gridlock across many multiple towns and cities. Organisers threatened prolonged action if the government refused to engage in negotiations. On 10 April the Dutch-flagged Thun Gemini was due to offload six million litres of agricultural, white diesel and kerosene at the Port of Galway but was unable to due to insufficient storage. That evening, the Garda Síochána declared an "exceptional event" in response to the protests, with every garda in the country ordered to work for the next three days.

Meetings were held on 10 and 11 April between Darragh O'Brien, Martin Heydon, Seán Canney, Timmy Dooley, the Irish Road Haulage Association (IRHA), the Irish Farmers' Association (IFA), the Irish Creamery Milk Suppliers Association (ICMSA) and other groups with no agreement reached.

Dozens of vehicles took part in a slow moving convoy around Strabane, Tyrone. Organisers stated they are protesting in solidarity with the protests in the Republic of Ireland.

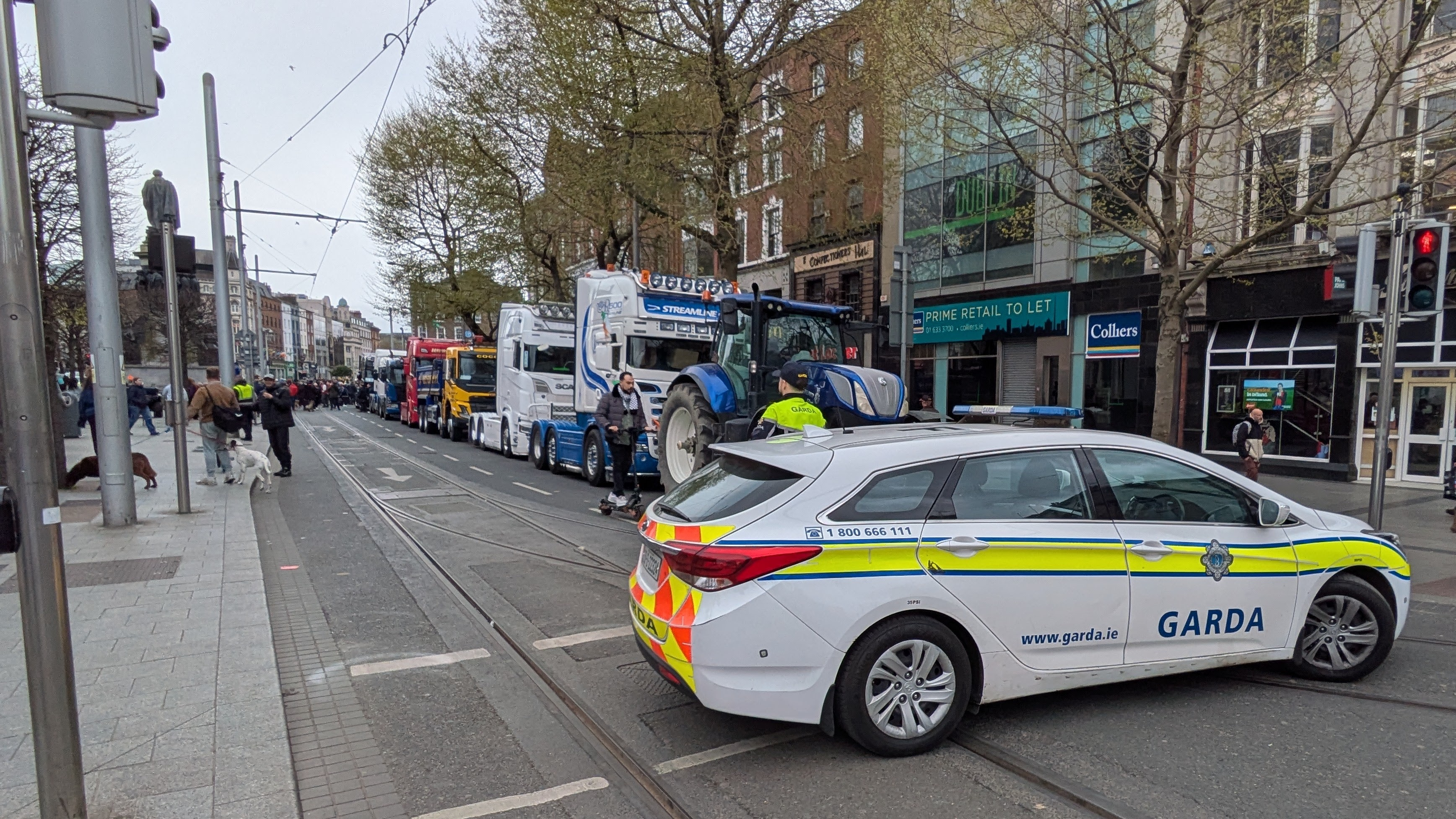
Fuel protests on O'Connell Street, Dublin, 10 April 2026

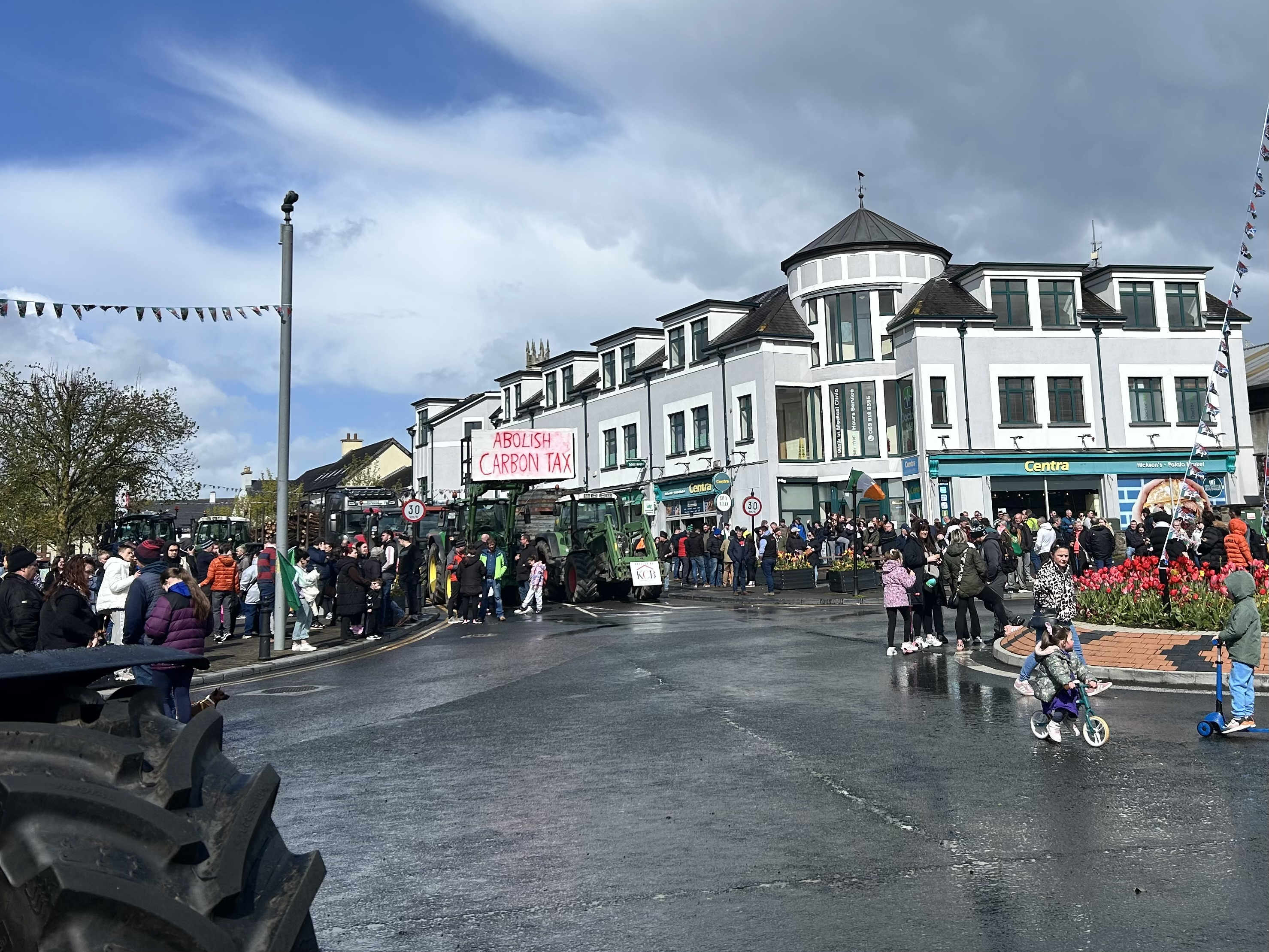
Protests in Carlow Town, 12 April 2026

=== Clearing of protests ===
On 11 April, there was an escalation in the Garda operation at the Whitegate oil refinery in Cork, which saw a number of arrests and physical clashes between the Garda Public Order Unit and protesters, including instances where pepper spray was used. Protesters said a 14-year-old boy was among those pepper sprayed. Members of the Defence Forces were also at the scene.

A major garda operation took place in the early hours of 12 April in Dublin and Galway to remove blockades on O'Connell Street, the M50 and at the Port of Galway. Around 200 uniformed gardaí, supported by the Garda Public Order Unit, Garda Mounted Unit, Garda Water Unit and the garda helicopter were involved in the removal of people and vehicles from O'Connell Street. Blockades also ended at the fuel depot at Foynes Port, County Limerick and Rosslare Europort.

By 13 April, it was reported all major routes were clear. The disruption at Whitegate oil refinery had been cleared of protesters, with a cordon remaining in place along with a strong garda presence.

=== Continuation ===
By 14 April there were continued blockade attempts, the Gardaí arrested drivers and seized trucks in an attempt to prevent the blockades. Protests began in Belfast on the same day, in which slow-moving tractors caused disruptions along major routes around the city.

==== November 2026 resurgence of protests ====
On 11 November, protesters declared protests to take place on 13 November.

On 13 November, 100 people gathered in Dublin, marching to the city hall following continued fuel price and cost of living crisis. Gardaí were deployed throughout the routes to contain the demonstrations.

== Demands ==
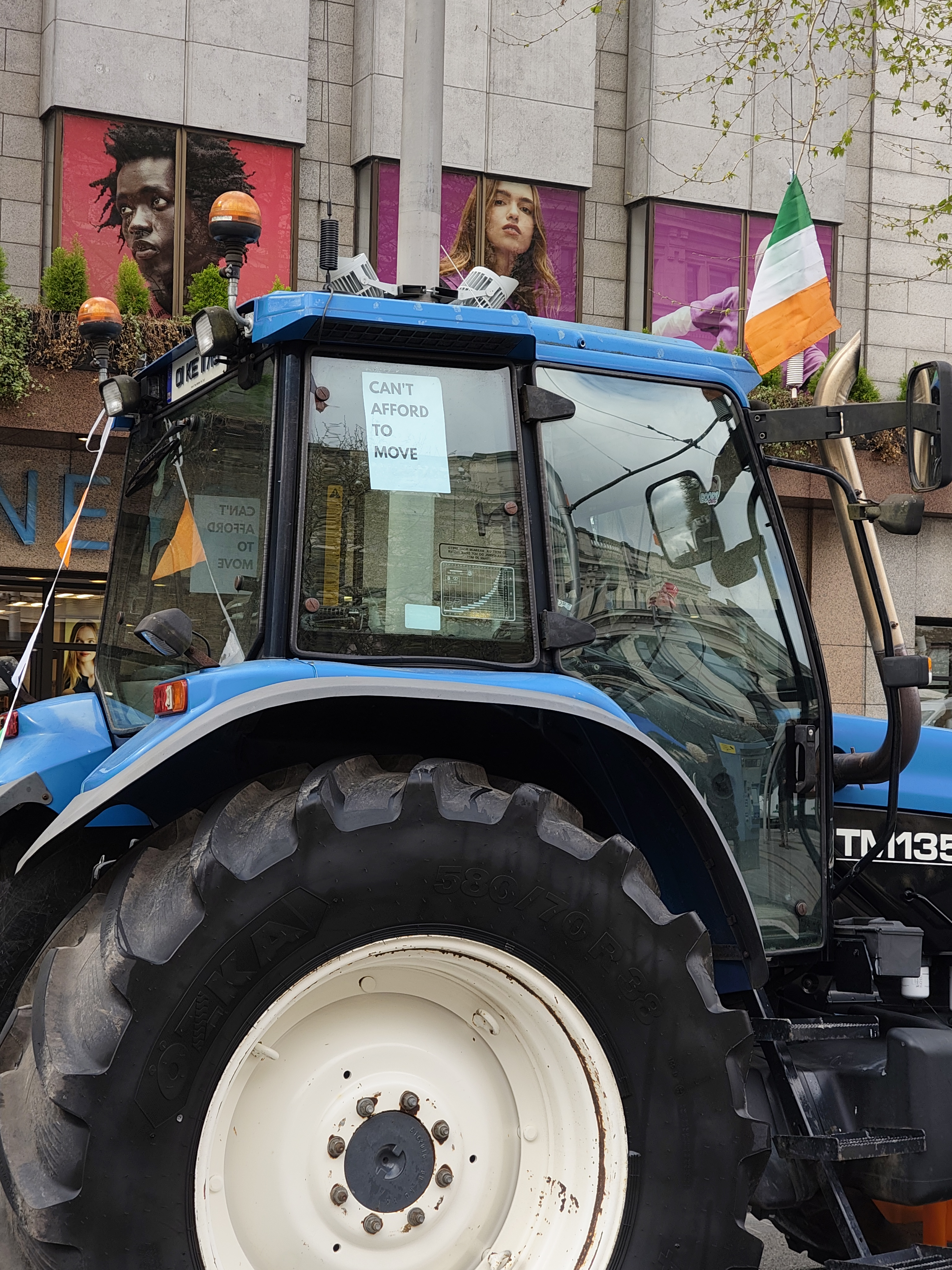
Irish fuel protests on O'Connell Street, Dublin, 8 April 2026

Protesters articulated a range of economic and policy demands, including:

- Introduction of a fuel price cap (reported figures range from €1.75 to €1.85 per litre on white diesel, €1.10 per litre for marine gas oil, green diesel, and kerosene each)
- Suspension of carbon taxes on fuel
- Further reductions in excise duties on petrol and diesel
- Direct financial supports, including proposed energy credits for households and businesses
- Broader government intervention to address cost-of-living and protect rural livelihoods
- Resignation of Micheál Martin as An Taoiseach

Protesters argued that rising fuel costs made it increasingly difficult to sustain businesses, particularly in sectors heavily dependent on diesel.

The demands of the protesters have been described as inconsistent over time, becoming "more extreme" between 7 and 10 April 2026.

== Impact ==
The protests have had wide-ranging effects, including:

- Severe traffic congestion in major cities, particularly Dublin
- Disruptions to commuter travel
- Fuel shortages in parts of Ireland
- Delays to emergency services and healthcare access
- Economic disruption affecting businesses and supply chains

The M50 northbound was closed from Junction 7 at Liffey Valley to Junction 4 at Ballymun, forcing some passengers en route to Dublin Airport to walk the remaining journey on the closed motorway.

In Dublin, many public transport services were suspended due to protests on 8 April. The Luas suspended operations between St Stephen's Green and Dominick because of demonstrations on O'Connell Street. Additionally, Dublin Bus had to cancel over 16 routes and reroute many others in response to the disruption.

By 9 April, a large number of fuel stations began to run out of petrol and diesel across Ireland. "Fuel for Ireland", a lobbying organisation stated that 100 of its members had run out of fuel, primarily in Munster, due to a blockade affecting 50% of Irish refining capacity.

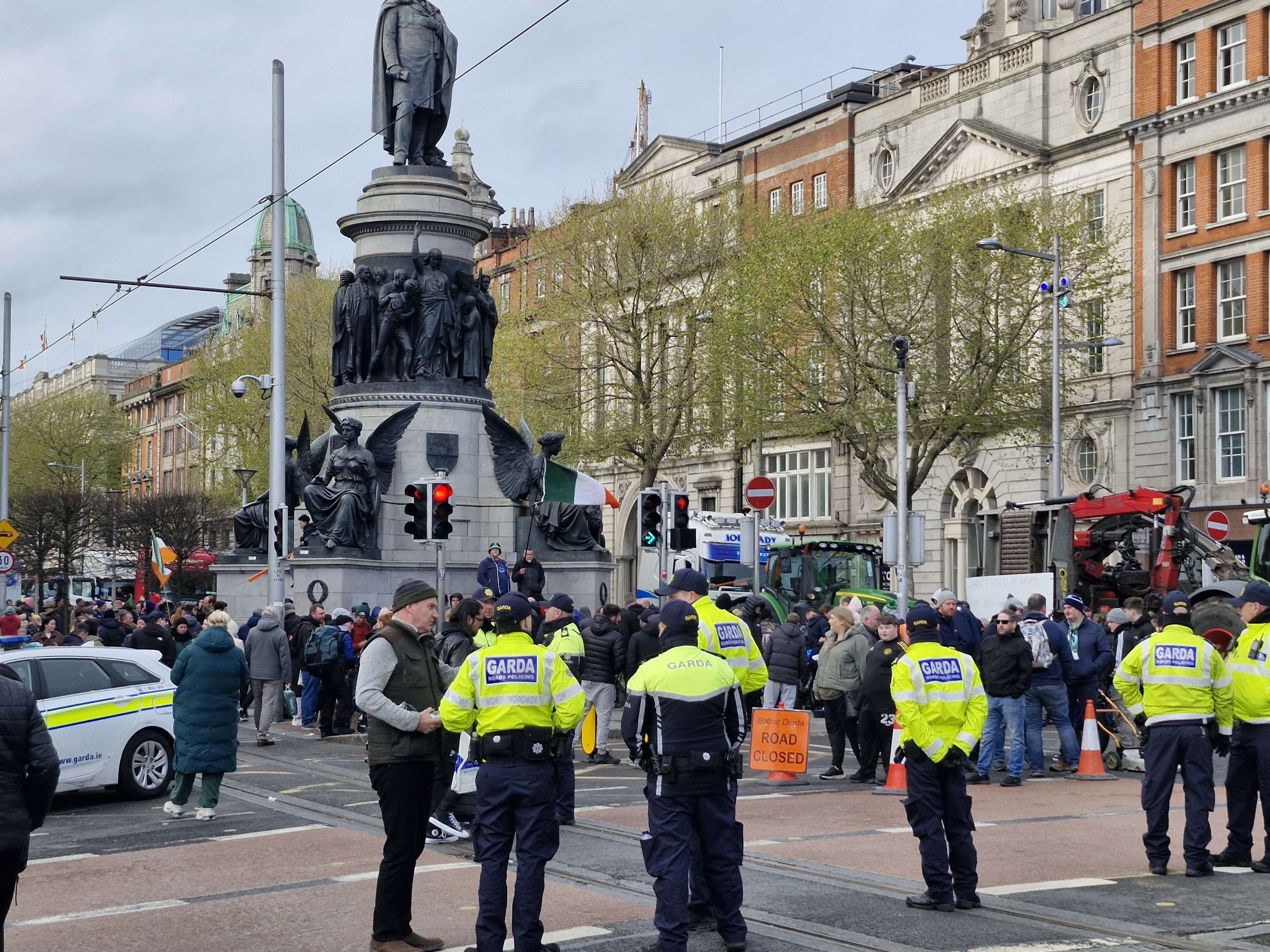
Fuel protesters on O'Connell Street

On 10 April, many service stations across the country had run out of diesel and/or petrol. Stations affected include the Junction 5 Carlow service station on the M9, with an estimated 500 stations predicted to be out of fuel nationwide. By the next day, around 600 of the 1,500 filling stations in the country had run out of fuel. It was also reported that Dance Moms star and celebrity Abby Lee Miller was seen stranded on the side of the M18 Southbound on 8 April. The public had been urged to only buy the fuel they need amid supply issues facing emergency services as a result of the blockades, with fire and ambulance services in the country curtailed.

By 11 April, the blockades resulted in full closures of parts of the M50, M4, M6, M7, M8, M9, and M20, with Transport Infrastructure Ireland saying there was "significant disruption" to its network affecting counties Clare, Limerick, Tipperary, Laois, Offaly, Kildare, Galway, Cork and Dublin.

Transport disruption on motorways and roads continued across the country on 12 April. As a result of the protests, the Department of Education and Youth announced the deferral of Leaving Certificate and Junior Cycle practical examinations, which were due to take place the following day.

By 13 April, 650 filling stations remained without fuel from around 700 at the peak of the shortage, while the National Emergency Coordination Group said Ireland's supply chains would take a number of days to return to normal.

== Reactions ==
=== Government response ===
An Taoiseach Micheál Martin heavily condemned the disruptive tactics used in the protests, calling it a "wrong form of protest". Martin described the blockade of the Whitegate refinery as "[an] act of national sabotage". He also warned that such actions could threaten essential fuel supplies. Controversially, on 9 April, Martin, on a visit to Macroom, County Cork, was accused of "[showing] zero respect" after he walked in a back entrance in the local IDA industrial estate in order to avoid fuel protesters. An Tánaiste Simon Harris described the blockades as "a despicable attack on [Irish] society and [the Irish] economy."

On 9 April 2026, Minister for Transport Darragh O'Brien announced that the Irish Defence Forces would be deployed to assist the Garda Síochána in removing blockades. Minister for Justice Jim O'Callaghan said that there would be "legal consequences" for the protests.

Authorities refused to negotiate directly with protest organisers, citing the lack of recognised representative structures.

On 12 April, the Irish government signed off on a €505 million support package, with direct payments to hauliers, bus operators, farmers, agricultural contractors and those involved in fisheries. Measures included a further 10c cut in excise on both petrol and diesel to the end of July, a new reduction of 2.4c on green diesel and carbon tax increases delayed until the budget in October.

=== Other political response ===
Some opposition parties strongly criticised the government's refusal to negotiate with protesters, urged the government to engage with protesters and backed the protesters' demands. Sinn Féin said that talks "should happen straight away". Independent Ireland said that engagement was "entirely possible". People Before Profit called to expand protests into a broader movement. Other parties such as Labour, Social Democrats, and Aontú said that protests should stop, however, they called for the government to "sit down with protesters".

The Irish Times questioned how realistic a negotiated settlement between protesters and the government might be given the former is "amorphous and decentralised". While acknowledging the seeming bona fides of most protesters, the newspaper has noted the presence of "sinister actors seeking to exploit the situation".

In the Irish Independent, Fionnán Sheahan reported that O'Callaghan had been criticised by figures within Fine Gael and Fianna Fáil for threatening to send in the Defence Forces, blaming his comments for hardening the stance of the protesters. There had been frustration voiced at the government's handling of the protests.

Minister for Culture, Communications and Sport Patrick O'Donovan said he would ask Coimisiún na Meán to review the media coverage of the protests, including RTÉ News, suggesting it had been "lopsided" in favour of the protests and that "carte blanche was given to some people". The National Union of Journalists condemned his remarks, describing them as "sinister and deeply disturbing" and an interference in editorial independence. However, Tánaiste Simon Harris said there was no need for any sort of "formal review" into the media coverage, saying he was "a big supporter of freedom of the media" and "freedom of the press". Labour TD Conor Sheehan warned that "serious questions remain about the conduct and judgement" of O'Donovan, while Aontú leader Peadar Tóibín said O'Donovan "way overstepped the mark on an authoritarian manner".

==== Motion of no confidence ====
On 12 April, a joint motion of no confidence in the government was tabled by opposition parties to take place on 14 April. The motion gained support from Labour, the Social Democrats, People Before Profit, the Green Party, Aontú, Independent Ireland, Sinn Féin and 100% Redress. On 13 April, Gillian Toole and Danny Healy-Rae, Independent TDs supporting the government, refused to confirm if they would vote confidence in the coalition. Taoiseach Micheál Martin and other ministers faced criticism from backbenchers during a meeting held on the same day, with Martin being described to be "very out of touch" and "very narky". Minister for Justice Jim O'Callaghan addressed concerns amid reports that Minister for Defence Helen McEntee was not informed prior to O'Callaghan's statement regarding the Defence Forces' involvement.

On the day of the no confidence motion, Independent Kerry TD Michael Healy-Rae told the Dáil he would be resigning from the government as Minister of State at the Department of Agriculture, Food and the Marine and voting no confidence, saying the government "let the people of Ireland down". His brother Danny Healy-Rae also voted no confidence in the government. Despite this, the government survived the motion by 92 votes to 78.

Vote on the Motion of Confidence in the Government (14 April 2026)
Vote	Count
Fianna Fáil, Fine Gael and Independent TDs: Michael Lowry, Gillian Toole, Barry Heneghan, Seán Canney, Marian Harkin, Kevin Boxer Moran and Noel Grealish. (Confidence)	92
Labour, Social Democrats, PBP, Independent Ireland, Sinn Féin, 100% Redress, Aontú, Green party and Independent TDs: Carol Nolan, Mattie McGrath, Seamus Healy, Brian Stanley, Paul Gogarty, Micheal Healy-Rae, Danny Healy-Rae. (No Confidence)	78
Abstain/Absent	4
Total	174

=== Public response ===
The public reaction has been mixed. While some members of the public expressed discontent with rising fuel costs, there was also widespread frustration at the disruptions caused by the blockades. Gardaí warned of significant traffic delays, while reports highlighted concerns about fuel supply disruptions and precautionary purchasing by motorists.

Dates conducted	Polling firm / Commissioner	Sample size	Support	Oppose	Undecided	Lead	Sources
10 April 2026	Ireland Thinks/Sunday Independent	1,000	56%	38%	6%	18%	
26 April-2 May 2026	More in Common	2,277	58%	20%	22%	38%	

A Sunday Independent poll found that support for the fuel protests significantly varied by party. Voters of Independent Ireland (99%), Sinn Féin (96%), Aontú (94%), minor parties (94%), independents (78%) and People Before Profit–Solidarity (77%) strongly supported the protests. By contrast, relatively few Fianna Fáil (15%), Fine Gael (18%), Labour Party (32%), Social Democrats (38%) and Green Party (43%) voters supported them.

== See also ==
- Energy in Ireland
- 2026 Irish public sector strikes
