= Martin government =

Martin government may refer to:

- 27th Canadian Ministry (2004–2006), led by Paul Martin
- 32nd Government of Ireland (2020–2022), led by Micheál Martin
- 32nd Government of Ireland (2024–present), led by Micheál Martin
