= Dunnes Stores strike =

Irish anti-apartheid strike (1984–87)

- Strikers outside a Dunnes Stores shop
- Duration: 3 years
- Motive: Importation of South African goods into Ireland during apartheid

Workers at a Dunnes Stores shop in Ireland staged a three-year strike against apartheid in South Africa between 1984 and 1987, which eventually led to the Irish Government banning the importation of South African goods into Ireland. Mary Manning, as instructed by her trade union, was the first to refuse to handle the fruit.

== Strike ==
On 19 July 1984, Mary Manning, a 21-year-old shop worker in the Henry Street, Dublin outlet of Dunnes Stores, refused to handle the sale of grapefruit from South Africa. Her union, the Irish Distributive and Administrative Trade Union (IDATU), had issued directions to its members not to handle South African produce in protest against the country's apartheid policies. When Manning and shop steward Karen Gearon continued to refuse to handle the produce, they were suspended and went on strike alongside other union members from a different store: Liz Deasy, Michelle Gavin, Vonnie Munroe, Alma Russell, Tommy Davis, Sandra Griffin, Theresa Mooney, Cathryn O'Reilly, and Brendan Barron.

While the strike lasted, the strikers got only £21 a week strike pay. At first, they received support from few individuals and groups, such as South African labour leader Nimrod Sejake, but they were encouraged when the South African archbishop Desmond Tutu met with the strikers on his way to receive the Nobel Peace Prize in Oslo and invited them to visit South Africa. Eight of the strikers travelled there in 1985 but were not permitted to enter the country. Their deportation received extensive news coverage in Ireland.

The strike lasted until April 1987 when the Irish Government banned the importation of South African goods. The ban came about as a result of public pressure in support of the strikers and was the first complete ban of South African imports by a Western government.

== Recognition and legacy ==
Irish Nobel Peace Prize winner Sean MacBride attended at least one of the strikes in May 1985.

The workers eventually met future president of South Africa and Nobel Peace Prize winner Nelson Mandela when he received the Freedom of the City of Dublin in 1990. Mandela said that the strikers demonstrated to South Africans that "ordinary people far away from the crucible of apartheid cared for our freedom" and helped him keep going when he was in prison.

A plaque commemorating the action, presented by South African President Thabo Mbeki, was unveiled on Henry Street in Dublin in June 2008, and a street has been named after Mary Manning in Johannesburg. Some of the strikers attended the funeral of Nelson Mandela in 2013.

Ewan MacColl wrote a song about the strike, titled "Ten young women and one young man", for a concert in Dublin. Christy Moore sings the song "Dunnes Stores", written by Sandra Kerr, about the strike. The UK pop group Latin Quarter dedicated their 1989 album Swimming Against the Stream to the 11 workers.

In 2014, a documentary about the strike, Blood Fruit, was released.

A play called Strike! by Tracy Ryan ran at the Southwark Playhouse in the spring of 2023.

== See also ==
- List of strikes in Ireland
