= List of strikes in Ireland =

Throughout Irish history, a number of strikes, labour disputes, student strikes, hunger strikes, and other industrial actions have occurred.

A labour strike is a work stoppage caused by the mass refusal of employees to work. This can include wildcat strikes, which are done without union authorisation, and slowdown strikes, where workers reduce their productivity while still carrying out minimal working duties. It is usually a response to employee grievances, such as low pay or poor working conditions. Strikes can also occur to demonstrate solidarity with workers in other workplaces or pressure governments to change policies.

== 20th century ==
=== 1900s ===
- 1907 Belfast Dock strike

=== 1910s ===
- Dublin lock-out
- 1913 Sligo Dock strike
- Conscription Crisis of 1918, including strikes, against the imposition of conscription by the British government, part of the Irish revolutionary period.

=== 1920s ===
- 1920 Munitions Strike, by railway workers refusing to transport British munitions, part of the Irish revolutionary period.
- 1922 Irish postal strike, the first strike in the newly-formed Irish Free State.

=== 1930s ===
- 1932 Outdoor Relief strike, in Belfast.

=== 1940s ===
- 1945 Irish laundry strike, 13-week strike by women laundry workers for additional holidays.

=== 1950s ===
- 1950–51 Irish rail strike

=== 1960s ===
- Irish bank strikes (1966–1976)
- 1966–67 Irish farmers' protests, led by the Irish Farmers' Association.
- 1969 Irish maintenance workers' strike, strike by ESB Group maintenance workers.

=== 1970s ===
- 1974 Dublin bus strike, 9-week strike by bus drivers in Dublin.
- Ulster Workers' Council strike
- 1979 Irish postal strike

=== 1980s ===
- Dunnes Stores strike

=== 1990s ===
- 1994 Dublin bar staff strike, 3-day strike by pub and bar staff in Dublin, coinciding with the 1994 FIFA World Cup.
- 1999 Irish nurses' strike

== 21st century ==
=== 2000s ===
- 2007–2008 Cork players' strike
- 2008–2009 Cork senior hurling team strike

=== 2010s ===
- Vita Cortex sit-in

=== 2020s ===
- 2024 Aer Lingus strike.
- 2024 Northern Ireland public sector strike, involving 150 000 public sector workers, the largest strike in Northern Ireland in over 50 years.
- 2026 Irish public sector strikes, involving 300,000 public sector workers, the largest strike in the Republic of Ireland since 2009.
