= Unemployment in India =

Statistics on unemployment in India had traditionally been collected, compiled and disseminated once every ten years by the Ministry of Labour and Employment (MLE), primarily from sample studies conducted by the National Sample Survey Office. Other than these 5-year sample studies, India had historically not collected monthly, quarterly or yearly nationwide employment and unemployment statistics on a routine basis. In 2016, the Centre for Monitoring Indian Economy, a non-governmental entity based in Mumbai, started sampling and publishing monthly unemployment in India statistics. Despite having one of the longest working hours, India has one of the lowest workforce productivity levels in the world. Economists often say that due to structural economic problems, India is experiencing jobless economic growth.

== Methodology and survey frequency ==
=== National Sample Survey ===
The National Sample Survey Office (NSSO) has been the key governmental agency in India at the national and state levels to study employment, unemployment and unemployment rates through sample surveys. It does not report employment or unemployment results every quarter nor every year, but generally only once every 5 years. The last three officially released NSSO survey and report on employment and unemployment were completed in 2004–2005, in 2009–2010, and 2011–2012. The 2011-2012 survey was initiated by the Congress-led Manmohan Singh's government because it was felt that the higher unemployment numbers in the 2009-2010 report may have been affected by poor monsoons, and an early survey might yield more accurate and better data. There was no NSSO survey between 2012 and 2017, and a new survey was initiated in 2017–2018. This report has not been officially released by the BJP-led Narendra Modi's government, but the report has been leaked to the media.

According to ILO, the NSSO surveys are India's most comprehensive as they cover small villages in remote corners and islands of India. However, this survey uses unconventional and India-specific terminology. It estimates the activity status of a person by different approaches i.e. "usual status" unemployment and "current status" unemployment. These estimates yield various forms of unemployment numbers, according to an ILO report, and the totals vary based on, factors such as whether a person has, for pay or no pay, "worked at least for 30 days during the reference period of 365", "worked for at least 1 hour on any day during the 7 days preceding the date of survey", and an estimate for "person-hours worked in the reference week" according to its statistical methods". From its sample survey, it estimates a wide range of employment and unemployment statistics, along with the total population of the nation, gender distribution, and a host of other data. The NSSO methodology has been controversial, praised for its scope and effort, also criticized for its "absurd" results and inconsistencies.

=== Labour bureau reports ===
The Indian Labour Bureau, in addition to the NSSO surveys, has published indirect annual compilations of unemployment data by each state government's labour department reports, those derived from the Annual Survey of Industries (ASI), Occupational Wage Surveys, and Working Class Family Income and Expenditure Surveys and other regular and ad-hoc field surveys and studies on India published by third parties.

=== CMIE reports ===
According to the Centre for Monitoring Indian Economy Private Limited (CMIE), India has never tracked and published monthly, quarterly or yearly employment and unemployment data for its people. This may have been a political convenience, states Mahesh Vyas, as "no measurements means there are no [political] arguments" about unemployment in India. CMIE, a non-government private entity, started to survey and publish monthly unemployment data for the first time in Indian history in 2016. Its data collection methodology and reports differ from those published by the NSSO.

=== ILO reports ===
The United Nations International Labour Organization has published its statistics for unemployment in India, along with other nations, based on the international standards it has adopted. In 2017, ILO updated its methodologies to make the labour force, employment and unemployment trends measurement more accurate and more consistent across countries. According to the ILO's 2018 World Employment of Social Outlook report, it adopted revisions and measures for all countries so as to "encompass the inclusion of additional data points (e.g. new or updated data for countries), removal of inconsistent data entries and revisions stemming from the application of the internationally agreed criteria in the computation of unemployment rates in countries where nation-specific, relaxed definitions of unemployment were previously reported. These changes account for 85 per cent of the downward revision to global unemployment figures". In 2017, the ILO adopted changes to its overall population data estimates as well, for each country including India. The ILO uses a complex and diverse set of population demographics, sample surveys and economic activity indicators to derive its estimates.

=== Transition to periodic measurements ===
In 2017, according to The Economic Times, the government announced that the "employment data collection in India will soon undergo a major revamp", after a high-level expert panel recommended an end to the five-year employment surveys by National Sample Survey Organisation (NSSO). The panel led by Niti Aayog vice chairman Arvind Panagariya recommended that it be replaced with an annual or more frequent and reliable data collection and reports. According to this panel, the NSSO methodology and practices have yielded misleading and biased data that "do not include the self-employed and farm workers, and are marred by low or irregular frequency and long-time lags".

== Statistics ==
Unemployment and under-employment have been a long-standing problem in the Indian economy. According to a 2013 report by Pravin Sinha, the Indian labour force has been officially classified by the Indian government into three categories:

- Rural sector, which includes the farm labour
- Urban formal sector, which includes factory and service industry labour with periodic salaries and coverage per Indian labor laws
- Urban informal sector, which includes self-employment and casual wage workers

The rural and informal sectors of the Indian labour market accounted for 93% of the employment in 2011, and these jobs were not covered by the then existing Indian labour laws. According to the 2010 World Bank report, "low-paying, relatively unproductive, informal sector jobs continue to dominate the [Indian] labor market." "The informal sector dominates India’s labour markets and will continue to do so in the medium term", states the World Bank, and even if the definition of the "formal sector is stretched to include all regular and salaried workers, some 335 million workers were employed in the informal sector in 2004–5".

=== 1980s to 2015 ===
According to the Indian government's official statistics between the 1980s and mid 2010s, relying in part on the NSSO data, the unemployment rate in India has been about 2.8%, which states the World Bank, is "a number that has shown little variation since 1983". In absolute terms, according to the various Indian governments between 1983 and 2005, the number of unemployed persons in India steadily increased from around 7.8 million in 1983 to 12.3 million in 2004–5. According to the World Bank, these official Indian government "low open unemployment rates can often be misleading" and the official data does not reflect the unemployment and under-employment reality of the Indian population.

For decades, the Indian governments have used unusual terminology and definitions for who it considers as "unemployed". For example, "only those people are considered unemployed who spent more than six months of the year looking for or being available for work" and have not worked at all in the formal or the informal sector over that period. Alternate measures such as the current weekly or daily status unemployment definition are somewhat better. Using the current daily status definition, the unemployment rate in India had increased from "7.3% in 1999–2000 to 8.3% in 2004–5", states the World Bank report. However, these "better" official definitions and consequent NSSO data too have been a source of "unending controversy" since the 1950s, states Raj Krishna. In 1958–59, the Indian government began defining a current status employed as any person if "he was gainfully occupied [for wage or no wage] on at least one day", during the reference week [reference period] "regardless of the hours of work" he might have put in on that "gainfully occupied" day [or days]. A person was counted as "current status unemployed", since 1958 according to this official method, if he was not at all "gainfully occupied in that reference week and was available for work for at least one day in that reference period".

==== Jobless economic growth ====
According to Kannan and Raveendran, "there is unanimity amongst scholars that the organised manufacturing sector [in India] registered “jobless growth” during 1980–81 to 1990–91; while the average annual rate of growth of gross value added during this period was about 8.66%, the corresponding average annual employment growth was merely 0.53%." After the deregulation of the Indian economy in the early 1990s, four years saw a boom in formal sector employment. Thereafter, the Indian economy has seen high GDP growth without a parallel increase in formal employment in the organized sector. This stagnation in formal sector employment, they state, has been attributed by some scholars to labor laws and regulations adopted since the 1950s that make inflexible labor market conditions and economic risks associated with offering formal sector employment. Other scholars contest that this hypothesis fully explains the unemployment and under-employment trends in India between 1981–82 and 2004–2005.

According to Rubina Verma, while the Indian economy has been shifting from being predominantly agriculture employment-based to one where the employment is a mix of agriculture, manufacturing and services, the economy has largely seen a "jobless growth" between the 1980s and 2007. This jobless growth in the Indian manufacturing has been puzzling, states Sonia Bhalotra, and is in part linked to the productivity growth. The major industries that have seen growth in formal employment have been export-oriented manufacturing, software, and local services. However, states Ajit Ghose, the services-based industry has not been "particularly employment-intensive", and its rapid growth has not addressed the unemployment and under-employment problems in India – and the job needs of its growing population – between 1983 and 2010.

According to Soumyatanu Mukherjee, even though the formal organized sector of the Indian economy grew rapidly in the 2000s, it did not create jobs and the growth was largely through capital intensive investments and labor productivity gains. The organised sector employment, states Mukherjee, actually "reduced dramatically between 2004~2005 and 2009–2010", especially when compared to 1999–2004 period if the NSSO reports for these periods were accurate.

=== 2018-2019 reports ===
According to the Pew Research Center, a significant majority of Indians consider the lack of employment opportunities as a "very big problem" in their country. "About 18.6 million Indians were jobless and another 393.7 million work in poor-quality jobs vulnerable to displacement", states the Pew report.

==== Leaked NSSO report ====
A report on unemployment prepared by the National Sample Survey Office's (NSSO's) periodic labour force survey, has not been officially released by the government. According to Business Today, this report is the "first comprehensive survey on employment conducted by a government agency after Prime Minister Narendra Modi announced demonetisation move in November 2016". According to this report, the 2017–2018 "usual status" unemployment rate in India at 6.1%, a four-decade high, possibly caused by the 2016 demonetisation of large banknotes intended to curb the informal untaxed economy.

The report and the refusal of the BJP government to release the latest NSSO report has been criticized. According to Surjit Bhalla, the BJP government's holding the report back is a bad political decision, the survey methodology is flawed and its results absurd, because the sample survey-based report finds that India's overall population has declined since 2011–12 by 1.2% (contrary to the Census data which states a 6.7% increase). The report finds that India's percent urbanization and urban workforce has declined since 2012, which is contrary to all other studies on Indian urbanization trends, states Bhalla. According to NSSO's report's data, "the Modi government has unleashed the most inclusive growth anywhere, and at any time in human history" – which is as unbelievable as the unemployment data it reports, states Bhalla. The NSSO report suggests the inflation-adjusted employment income of casual workers has dramatically increased while those of the salaried wage-earners has fallen during the 5-years of BJP government. The NSSO has also changed the sampling methodology in the latest round, state Bhalla and Avik Sarkar, which is one of the likely sources of its flawed statistics and conclusions.

The report states that male youth had an unemployment rate of 17.4% and 18.7% in rural and urban areas, while women youth had rates of 13.6% and 27.2% respectively in 2017–18. However, the think tank of Government of India, NITI Aayog says that these are not official and the data is not yet verified. The Indian labor force is estimated to be growing by 8 million per annum, but the Indian economy is currently not producing new full-time jobs at this rate.

The BJP-led Indian government has claimed that the NSSO report was not final.

==== ILO estimates ====
According to the International Labour Organization (ILO) – a United Nations agency, unemployment is rising in India and the "unemployment rate in the country [India] will stand at 3.5% in 2018 and 2019 – the same level of unemployment seen in 2016 and 2017", instead of dropping to 3.4% as it had previously projected. According to the ILO's World Employment Social Outlook Report, the unemployment rate in India has been in the 3.4% to 3.6% range over the Indian-government led 2009–2014 and the government led 2014–2019 periods.

=== 2022 Report ===
According to the Ministry of Statistics and Programme Implementation Report, the unemployment rate in India has dropped to 7.2% in the October–December quarter of 2022. This marks a significant improvement from the previous quarter, which had a rate of 8.1%.

In urban areas, the unemployment rate for persons aged 15 years and above declined to 7.2% from October to December 2022 from 8.7% a year ago, according to the National Sample Survey (NSSO) report.

== Causes of unemployment in India ==
According to Alakh Sharma, the causes of high unemployment and under-employment in India are the subject of intense debate among scholars. A group of scholars state that it is a consequence of "restrictive labour laws that create inflexibility in the labour market", while organised labour unions and another group of scholars contest this proposed rationale. India has about 250 labour regulations at central and state levels, and global manufacturing companies find the Indian labour laws to be excessively complex and restrictive compared to China and other economies that encourage manufacturing jobs, according to the economist Pravakar Sahoo. According to Sharma, the Indian labour laws are "so numerous, complex and even ambiguous" that they prevent a pre-employment economic environment and smooth industrial relations. India needs "labour market reforms that address the needs of both employers and workers", and it should rewrite its labour laws that protect its workers, provides social security for workers between jobs, and makes compliance easier for the industry. According to The Economist the Indian labor laws are inflexible and restrictive, and this in combination with its poor infrastructure is a cause of its unemployment situation.

Unemployment is a major social issue in India. As of September 2018, according to the Indian government, India had 31 million jobless people. The numbers are widely disputed.The uses of digital manufacturing and machinery in factories and garments are leading to unemployment in India. The unemployment rates declined to 6.5% in January 2021.

As the pandemic's second catastrophic wave battered the country, unemployment shot up to 14.45 per cent in the week ending May 16, 2021, and remained at an elevated level of 13.62 per cent in the week ending June 6.

== Government policies ==
=== Mahatma Gandhi National Rural Employment Guarantee Act 2005 ===
The Government of India has taken several steps to decrease the unemployment rates like launching the Mahatma Gandhi National Rural Employment Guarantee Scheme which guarantees a 100-day employment to an unemployed person in a year. It has implemented it in 200 of the districts and further will be expanded to 600 districts. In exchange for working under this scheme the person is paid 150 per day.

Apart from Employment Exchange, the Government of India publishes a weekly newspaper titled Employment News. It comes out every Saturday evening and gives detailed information about vacancies for government jobs across India. Along with the list of vacancies, it also has the notifications for various government exams and recruitment procedures for government jobs.

=== Steps taken on disguised unemployment ===
Agriculture is the most labour absorbing sector of the economy. In recent years, there has been a decline in the dependence of population on agriculture partly because of disguised unemployment. Some of the surplus labour in agriculture has moved to either secondary or the tertiary sector. In the secondary sector, small scale manufacturing is the most labour absorbing. In case of the tertiary sector, various new services are now appearing like biotechnology, information technology and so on. The government has taken steps in these sectors for the disguised unemployed people in these methods.

=== National Career Service Scheme ===
The Government of India has initiated National Career Service Scheme whereby a web portal named National Career Service Portal (www.ncs.gov.in) has been launched by the Ministry of Labour and Employment (India). Through this portal, job-seekers and employers can avail the facility of a common platform for seeking and updating job information. Not only private vacancies, contractual jobs available in the government sector are also available on the portal.

=== National Rural Employment Programme ===
The National Rural Employment Programme offers people from the rural areas an equal shot at job opportunities across the nation. The growing disparity in terms of personal finance between those in the rural and urban areas has increasingly led to people from the rural areas to move to the urban areas, making urban management difficult. The NREP aims to provide employment opportunities in the rural areas, especially in times of drought and other such scarcities.

=== Deen Dayal Antyodaya Yojana ===
The Deen Dayal Antyodaya Yojana is a scheme that aims to help the poor by providing them industrially recognised skills. The scheme is implemented by the Ministry of Rural development. The purpose of the scheme is to eradicate both urban and rural poverty from the country by providing necessary skills to individuals that help them find well-paying job opportunities.

This is aimed to be achieved through skill training and skill upgrading which enables the poor to get self-employed, elevate themselves above the poverty line, be eligible for bank loans, etc.

== Politics ==
Unemployment has long been an important issue in Indian politics, particularly because of India’s large and growing workforce. Political parties frequently campaign on promises of job creation, economic development, poverty reduction, and skills training. Economic issues, including unemployment and underemployment, have often featured prominently in national and state election campaigns.

During the 2019 Indian general election, unemployment was widely regarded as one of the principal campaign issues. Opposition parties argued that India was experiencing a jobs crisis, citing labour-force survey data that indicated the highest unemployment rate in decades, while the government disputed some interpretations of the data and emphasized broader economic growth and employment generation.

Studies and public-opinion surveys have found that employment opportunities are among the most important concerns for Indian voters, especially young people entering the labour market. Analysts have suggested that unemployment and economic insecurity are likely to remain significant influences on India’s political debate and public policy.

== See also ==
- List of states and union territories of India by unemployment rate
- List of countries by unemployment rate
- Economic Advisory Council
- Late-2000s recession
- Income in India
- Child labour in India
- Unemployment in Kerala
- Work–life balance
- Unemployment benefits
- Universal basic income
