= Nimrod Sejake =

South African trade unionist

Nimrod Sejake (8 August 1920 – 27 May 2004) was a labour leader in South Africa in the 1950s. He was a leading member of the Congress of South African Trade Unions, initially as secretary of the Iron Steel Workers, and became active in the African National Congress (ANC) in Soweto in the 1950s.

He was one of the defendants at the Treason Trial, and on his arrest shared a cell with Nelson Mandela. For safety reasons, he sought exile in Ireland.

Later, he became a prominent figure in the Marxist Workers Tendency of the ANC.

While in exile, he was mistakenly presumed dead by the ANC. In the 1980s, he was featured on the front cover of an official history of SACTU, the ANC trade union, where he was erroneously listed as deceased by both the authors and the ANC.

He was an early and key supporter of the Dunnes Stores Strike from 1984 to 1987.

After his return from exile, he established a socialist reading groups in his township, Evaton.
