= List of states and union territories of India by unemployment rate =

This is a list of States and union territories of India ranked according to unemployment rate. The list is compiled from the Report on Periodic Labour Force Survey (2018–19) released by Ministry of Statistics and Programme Implementation, Government of India.

Chhattisgarh has the least unemployment rate among the Indian states, while Rajasthan has the highest unemployment rate. (Higher rank represents higher unemployment among the population). The national average stands at 6.4 percent.

== Unemployment rate by States and Union territory (CMIE Data) ==
(As of September 2022)
State or union territory	Unemployment rate (%)
Andhra Pradesh	4.8
Arunachal Pradesh	18.3
Assam	10.4
Bihar	11.4
Chhattisgarh	10.1
Delhi	9.6
Goa	10.9
Gujarat	3.9
Haryana	22.9
Himachal Pradesh	9.2
Jammu and Kashmir	23.2
Jharkhand	12.2
Karnataka	10.65
Kerala	5.8
Madhya Pradesh	0.9
Maharashtra	4.3
Meghalaya	12.3
Mizoram	NA
Nagaland	NA
Odisha	15.9
Puducherry	7.3
Punjab	7.0
Rajasthan	23.8
Sikkim	NA
Tamil Nadu	4.1
Telangana	8.3
Tripura	17.0
Uttar Pradesh	24.0
Uttarakhand	0.5
West Bengal	3.3

== Unemployment rate every month ==
Month	India	Urban	Rural
Feb 2023	7.45	7.93	7.23
Jan 2023	7.14	8.55	6.48
Dec 2022	8.30	8.96	7.61
Nov 2022	8.00	8.96	7.61
Oct 2022	7.92	7.34	8.19
Sept 2022	6.43	7.70	5.84
Aug 2022	8.28	9.57	7.68
July 2022	6.83	8.22	6.17
June 2022	7.83	7.32	8.07
May 2022	7.14	8.24	6.63
Apr 2022	7.83	9.22	7.18
Mar 2022	7.57	8.28	7.24
Feb 2022	8.11	7.57	8.37
Jan 2022	6.56	8.14	5.83
Dec 2021	7.91	9.30	7.23
Nov 2021	6.97	8.20	6.41
Oct 2021	7.74	7.37	7.91

== See also ==
- Unemployment in India
- Unemployment in Kerala
