= 1920 Munitions Strike =

- Part of the Irish War of Independence
- Date: 27 May 1920 – 10 December 1920
- Location: Ireland
- Methods: Strike action

The 1920 Munitions Strike was a seventh-month strike action by railway workers in Ireland during the Irish War of Independence. Carried out in support of Irish independence from British rule, workers involved in the strike refused to work and assist trains which transported munitions for British forces. Though the strike eventually ended due to pressure exerted by the Dublin Castle administration, the strike greatly impaired the effectiveness of British forces during the conflict.

== Background ==
During the Irish War of Independence, Ireland's labour movement was mostly supportive of Ireland's independence from British rule. Members of the movement were involved in the establishment of Irish soviets independent from British authority along with organising and carrying out strike actions, notably the 1920 Irish general strike.

== Strike ==
The strike began in Dublin on late May 1920, when local railway workers joined an action by local dockworkers to refuse to handle incoming weapons shipments for British forces in Ireland. It was inspired by the Hands Off Russia campaign, led by British socialists against the anti-communist Allied intervention in the Russian Civil War, where dockworkers refused to load ships with weapons shipments destined to be used in support of the White Army.

The strike caused widespread disruptions to the Irish railway system. The railway companies, under pressure from the Dublin Castle administration, sacked hundreds of workers who were participating in the Strike. By the start of winter 1920, however, the strike began to falter as the mass sackings and closures of rail lines led to significant financial hardship for railway workers, and the financial resources of railway labour unions ran low. In early December, the British government declared martial law in Ireland. Following the declaration of martial law, the railway unions decided to end the strike.

== Aftermath and legacy ==
Peter Rigney of the Irish Congress of Trade Unions described the Munitions Strike as "the largest manifestation of passive resistance during the war of independence." Donal Ó Drisceoil of University College Cork has stated that the strike was "technically a ‘victory’ for the British government" but that it "seriously impacted on British military effectiveness and struck a major symbolic blow for Irish independence." In 2020, Irish playwright Deirdre Kinahan put out the play Embargo, based on the Strike.

== See also ==
- History of rail transport in Ireland
- List of strikes in Ireland
