= 2026 Irish public sector strikes =

Series of nationwide demonstrations in the Republic of Ireland

- Part of Budget 2027
- Members of the Irish Federation of University Teachers on strike at Maynooth University on 14 October 2026
- Date: Work-to-rule started 5 October, multiple strikes on 14 October, additional strikes planned for 21 October, 12 November cancelled.
- Location: Republic of Ireland

In September 2026, approximately 300,000 workers across Ireland's public sector commenced nationwide industrial action, following negotiations with the Irish Government on securing a new public service pay agreement falling through.

== Background ==
Workers in the public service of the Republic of Ireland have traditionally negotiated their pay via a Public Service Agreement, signed between the Irish Congress of Trade Unions (ICTU) and the Government of Ireland, with the most recent agreement covering the period from 1 January 2024 to 30 June 2026. With the expiry of this agreement, and negotiations with the Government on a new agreement falling through, unions representing public sector workers such as the Services, Industrial, Professional and Technical Union (SIPTU) began balloting their members for industrial action in September 2026.

== Timeline ==
In September 2026, the Irish trade union Fórsa's website announced that there were not any ongoing discussions with the Government of Ireland on a new public sector pay deal after the previous one expired on 30 June. The Irish Nurses and Midwives Organisation (INMO), Fórsa, SIPTU, the Association of Secondary Teachers, Ireland (ASTI), and the Irish National Teachers' Organisation (INTO) announced that they would start work-to-rule, a job action in which employees do no more than the minimum required by the rules of their contract or job. For teachers, this meant only working during school hours, including refusing to participate in after-school meetings or parent–teacher conferences. The ASTI and INTO started work-to-rule on 6 October, with one-day strikes planned for 14 and 21 October. The Irish Federation of University Teachers (IFUT) started a one hour work stoppage on 5 October at 12pm.

On 14 October, virtually all public sector trade unions affiliated to ICTU commenced 24-hour strikes, leading to widespread picketing outside of schools, hospitals, universities and government buildings. Higher education workers were also joined by a simultaneous strike by the Postgraduate Workers' Organisation (PWO), a union representing doctoral candidates which is not a recognised trade union.

Following the strikes on 14 October, the Public Services Committee (PSC) of ICTU entered into dialogue with Government representatives, and the planned strike on the 21 October was called off following a meeting of the 19 unions affiliated to the PSC. This followed an agreement with the PSC and the Government to formally enter into talks, mediated by Kevin Foley, chairperson of the Workplace Relations Commission, commencing on 17 October. While the ICTU-affiliated unions did not engage in strike action on 21 October, the PWO engaged in strike action in University College Dublin and other Higher Education Institutions on 21 October, due to their members, currently classified as PhD students, not being represented in public sector pay talks.

On 2 November, following two weeks of negotiations between the PSC and the Government, the PSC announced that unions were planning for a further 24-hour strike on 12 November, as no agreement had been reached between the two parties. This date was particularly politically sensitive as a meeting of the European Political Community is scheduled to take place in Dublin on 12 November. Rather than pickets outside of workplaces, unions instead planned to hold rallies in Dublin, Letterkenny, Cork, Limerick, Sligo, Waterford and Tullamore.

By 9 November, Taoiseach Mícheál Martin announced that a "substantially improved" pay offer had been made to unions, equating to an increase of 10.5% over 2.5 years.. In the early hours of 11 November, this had increased to 10.75%, resulting in a pay agreement worth €5.2 billion. As a result, the unions agreed to this increase, concluding the talks and leading to the cancellation of the planned strikes on 12 November. The agreement still needs to be voted on by lay members of the trade unions, with results expected by December.

== Reactions ==
=== Government response ===
The Irish Government has said that they are "willing to enter talks but that it will not be held to a pre-determined outcome".

When announcing Budget 2027 on 6 October, Minister for Public Expenditure, Infrastructure, Public Service Reform and Digitalisation Jack Chambers mentioned the strikes, saying that he hoped that no further disruption to the public sector would occur. Micheál Martin, the Taoiseach, criticised the planned strikes and called them unnecessary. John Boyle, the general secretary of the INMO called this language inflammatory.

=== Political support ===
The strikes have seen political support from opposition parties, namely Sinn Féin, the Labour Party, the Social Democrats, Aontú, and People Before Profit–Solidarity. The strikes have also openly been supported by Aontas na Mac Léinn in Éirinn (AMLÉ), the national third-level students' union, and its constituent students' unions, particularly in the context of supporting doctoral candidates and to show solidarity with higher education workers, following an earlier protest held by AMLÉ over higher education funding and the cost of college.

== Unions involved ==
- Association of Higher Civil and Public Servants (AHCPS)
- Association of Secondary Teachers, Ireland (ASTI)
- Building & Allied Trades' Union (BATU)
- Fórsa
- Connect
- Irish Federation of University Teachers (IFUT)
- Irish Medical Organisation (IMO)
- Irish National Teachers' Organisation (INTO)
- Irish Nurses and Midwives' Organisation (INMO)
- Medical Laboratory Scientists' Association (MLSA)
- Postgraduate Workers' Organisation (PWO)
- Prison Officers' Association (POA)
- Services Industrial Professional Technical Union (SIPTU)
- Teachers Union of Ireland (TUI)
- Unite the Union

== See also ==
- Irish Congress of Trade Unions
- List of strikes in Ireland
