= Cost-of-living crisis =

Situation where prices of essentials rise faster than wages

A cost-of-living crisis is a situation or period of high inflation with increases in the nominal cost of living while real wages decrease. As a result, real income and living standards are squeezed to the point that people cannot afford the standard of living that they were previously accustomed to. The population becomes 'poorer' than it used to be in real terms. This is in contrast to a situation in which wages are rising with inflation and workers' standard of living remains unchanged. The Big Issue defines a cost of living crisis as "a situation in which the cost of everyday essentials like groceries and bills are rising faster than average household incomes".

During the 2020s, a cost-of-living crisis impacted many countries around the world amid the 2021–2023 inflation surge. The International Monetary Fund (IMF) wrote in its October 2026 World Economic Outlook, that "the rising cost of living has emerged as a major concern for households across much of the world in recent years" and lists the global commodities markets disruptions and energy crisis as a result of the Russo-Ukrainian war since 2022 and the 2026 Iran war fuel crisis as the driving causes for abrupt price increases in food, transport, and housing, including energy utilities. It states the welfare losses are particularly large for lower-income households, which are more exposed to the cost of basic necessities.

== Effects on society ==
=== Health ===
Cost-of-living crises have had significant and wide-ranging negative consequences for mental and physical well-being. For example, high food prices force people to choose to eat cheaper foods with less nutritional value or less food in general. Worse nutrition also leads to a higher likelihood of getting sick from infectious diseases. In poorer countries, there is a higher risk of starvation. Public health can be threatened. Reduced access to household heating and cooling has been demonstrated to cause a range of health issues including respiratory and cardiovascular illness, heat-related illness, poorer mental health and in some cases premature death.

Mental health also declines across the board due to the stress of being unable to afford to live properly. Rates of depression and anxiety increase. People are also more likely to lose sleep, forego meeting with friends, not engage in their hobbies, and skip out on exercising. A cost-of-living crisis will lead to a higher demand for social and health services. However, higher operating expenses and a lack of staff to meet the higher demand will result in squeezed budgets and worse service. Overworked and underpaid staff will also be more likely to quit, creating a vicious cycle.

=== Job market ===
Workers are more likely to quit their job and switch to a higher-paying one because their current job no longer pays enough to cover their lifestyle expenses. Workers are most likely to strike in an effort to improve their circumstances.

=== Business and investments ===
Small businesses will be negatively affected due to higher material and energy prices. Customers also have less purchasing power, and so will purchase fewer items from companies who do not sell essential goods. It becomes more difficult to predict investment returns because of market volatility and uncertainty. People are also less likely to invest in businesses or the stock market because they have less disposable income.

=== Spending and debt ===
Consumer confidence drops. Non-essential spending is reduced, with luxury goods, travel and fashion seeing the greatest declines. People are more likely to take on debt in order to keep up with bills and living expenses.

== By region ==
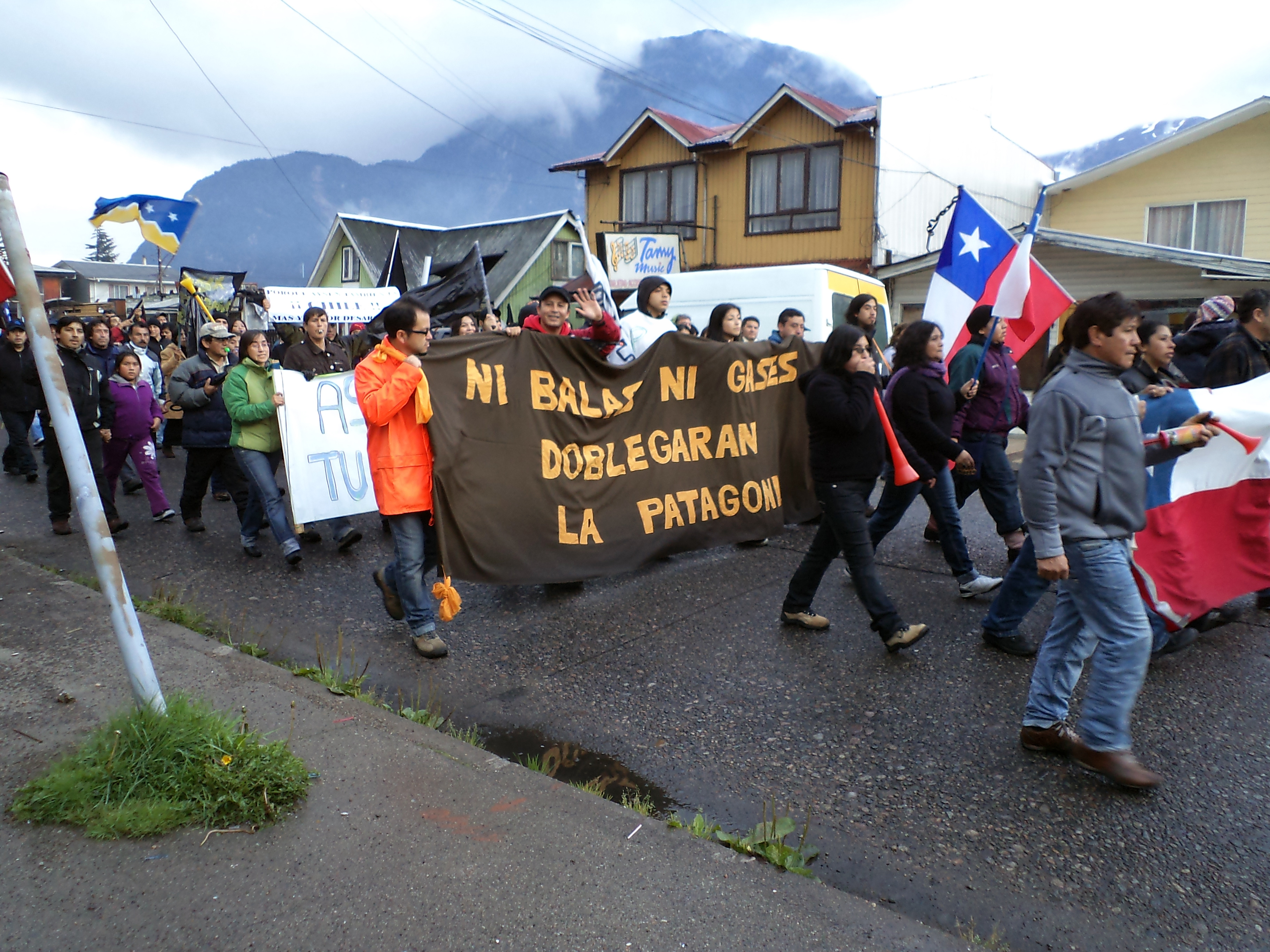
2012 Aysén protests due to the high cost of living in Patagonia

In 2022, The Guardian reported that numerous countries were being impacted by a cost of living crisis, including Australia, Belgium, Germany, India, Ireland, Israel and Palestine, Italy, New Zealand, Nigeria, The Philippines, South Africa and Taiwan.

=== Americas ===
==== Canada ====
In 2024, CBC News reported many Canadians were struggling amidst rising living costs and working multiple jobs.

==== United States ====
Nearly half of Americans, especially lower-income families, have struggled to afford the basic cost of living in part due to inflation during the Second Trump Administration.

==== Brazil ====
In 2022, Brazil saw double digit inflation rates. Despite Brazil being an agricultural powerhouse, food prices are rising.

=== Europe ===
The 2026 European unrest saw large-scale youth-led protests across Western and Southern Europe as part of the worldwide Gen Z protests, with the cost-of-living crisis among the principal grievances cited by demonstrators, alongside underfunded education, housing unaffordability, and opposition to increased military spending. It involved demonstrations and in some instances riots, with major actions in the second half of the year in France, Germany, Italy, Spain, Portugal, Belgium, Albania, and Serbia.

==== France ====
In France, in protest at rising fuel (petrol) prices – according to the government caused primarily by the US-Iran war, next to the war of Saudi Arabia against Houthi’s in Yemen – fishermen in mid-September 2026 blocked the entrances to the ports of Nice and Sète and to an oil depot in Frontignan. Crude oil prices allegedly had spiked 20% in September, the price of diesel in France spiked at €2.37 per liter ($2.72 per liter) on 17 September. The government announced to increase its petrol subsidies to the maximum level allowed under EU rules, but this did not directly quell the anger of the fishermen.

==== Germany ====
Germany's consumer price index increased by more than 20% between January 2022 and December 2024 following the onset of the German economic crisis, during which energy-price spikes drove sharply increased inflation before the rate moderated.

==== Ireland ====
Ireland in 2026 experienced a cost-of-living crisis, resulting in Ireland becoming the most expensive country in the European Union. This crisis has been accompanied by crises in housing, fuel and healthcare. A reported 36% of Irish families were not able to pay at least one essential household bill. This economic strain has contributed to public dissatisfaction which resulted in the April 2026 Irish fuel protests.

==== United Kingdom ====
In late 2021, the prices of many essential goods in the United Kingdom began increasing faster than household incomes, resulting in a fall in real incomes. The phenomenon has been termed a cost-of-living crisis. It is due in part to the economic impact of the COVID-19 pandemic, including a global surge in inflation, wage stagnation attributed to the Conservative Party's austerity programme, as well as the economic instability and mass migration caused by Brexit and the Russo-Ukrainian war.

While all in the UK are affected by rising prices, the crisis most substantially affects people living in poverty. The British government has responded with measures including grants, tax rebates, and subsidies to electricity and gas suppliers. Regular pay began to outpace inflation beginning in May 2023, but living costs have remained at elevated levels, and have continued to increase faster than headline inflation into 2025. The Joseph Rowntree Foundation projected in 2025 that disposable incomes would continue to decline for the rest of the decade.

=== Oceania ===
==== Australia ====
In the 2020s, Australia faced a cost of living crisis, impacting food security and increasing demands for food banks.

== See also ==
- 2021–2023 inflation surge
- Consumer price index
- Cost-of-living index
