= Irish Road Haulage Association =

The Irish Road Haulage Association (IRHA) was founded in 1973 to represent and promote the interests of the licensed transport industry in Ireland.

The association is run by a council and management committee, and chaired by a president. According to its website, it is structured to "ensure the views and needs of members [..] are considered on an equal one member one vote basis". The association has nine regional branches. These are located in Dublin, Cork, Kerry, the Midlands, Midwest, West, North East, North West and South East.
