= Centre for Monitoring Indian Economy =

Indian think tank and company

- Founded: 13 April 1976; 50 years ago
- Founder: Narottam Shah
- Headquarters: Mumbai, India
- Key people: Mahesh Vyas
- Website: www.cmie.com

The Centre for Monitoring Indian Economy (CMIE) is an independent private limited entity that serves both as an economic think-tank as well as a business information company. CMIE research group has built databases on the Indian economy and private companies. CMIE provides this information in the form of databases and research reports via a subscription-based business model. It is headquartered in Mumbai, with additional offices in India.

== History ==
CMIE was founded by Narottam Shah on 13 April 1976. It began as an information organisation cum Think Tank that helped the business community gain access to economic data and to understand the underlying trends. The company ran a service called Economic Intelligence Service which delivered a set of documents every 5th of the month. Economic Intelligence Service delivered mostly statistics from hundreds of official documents. It presented these with useful pithy observations of the trends which reflected Shah's studious understanding of the Indian economy. The service included a Monthly Review of the Indian Economy and reference volumes such as Basic Statistics Relating to Indian Economy I & II and Key Financial Data of Larger Business Units and special occasional documents such as Profiles of Districts and Shape of Things to Come. The service was famous for punctuality and reliability. Narottam Shah died on 23 March 1984 Eventually, the Economic Intelligence Service was phased out. But, CMIE continues to retain two main characteristics of Shah's CMIE – delivering long normalised time-series data and always being updated with the latest available data in its new deliveries.

Prof D T Lakdawala, Narottam Shah's Ph D guide took over as Director of CMIE after the sudden death of Shah. CMIE started undergoing a gradual change in the early 1990s. It had transformed itself into a private limited company owned entirely by the immediate family members of Shah. The company continues to be a family owned enterprise with shares held entirely by the four children of Narottam Shah.

Narottam Shah's son, Ajay Shah, an IIT-B alumni and a Ph D in economics from USC, LA took over the Directorship of CMIE in the early to mid-1990s. After a few years at CMIE he moved on to a career in academics and public policy work in IGIDR and then Ministry of Finance. Mahesh Vyas took over as managing director and CEO of CMIE in 1996.

In the 1990s, CMIE transformed itself into a database services company. The foundations of creating database were established by Narottam Shah in 1984 just before his death. Ajay Shah played a pivotal role in strengthening that foundation. CMIE became an early user of UNIX-based systems, an early adopter of internet connectivity in the late 1980s / early 1990s thanks to his efforts and his connections with IIT-B. Ajay Shah continues to be on the board of CMIE. But, he has not been involved in the day-to-day management of the company since he left the company in 1996.

CMIE has evolved substantially since those early days, under the directorship of Mahesh Vyas. It is currently headed by Mahesh Vyas.

== Research focus ==
CMIE's focuses on the Indian economy, industries, states, agriculture, foreign exchange, and businesses, as well as global economies. National accounts figures, public finance statistics, money controls, and balance of payments statistics are all included in the firm's macroeconomic database. Market beacon is a database of macroeconomic time series, and International economics is a database of macroeconomic time series data on individual countries. Industry analysis is provided by the firms' sectoral services, which covers the manufacturing and service sectors. Its monthly state-level overview examines recent economic developments in each state, including agriculture, public distribution, infrastructure, electricity, manufacturing, investments, rates, tourism, and public finance. Competitor monitoring, analytical company reports, content delivery, spot commodity price polling, and the collection of industry statistics are also offered.

According to CMIE, India has never tracked and published monthly, quarterly or yearly employment and unemployment data for its people. This may have been a political convenience, states Mahesh Vyas, as "no measurements means there are no [political] arguments" about unemployment in India. CMIE, a non-government private entity, started to survey and publish monthly unemployment data for the first time in Indian history in 2016. Its data collection methodology and reports differ from those published by the NSSO.

== Primary and secondary databases ==
In the late 1980s, CMIE started building proprietary primary databases. It began with a database of the performance of enterprises operating in India. The foundation of this effort was laid by Narottam Shah. But, the operations scaled up substantially in the 1990s as the business databases industry grew rapidly and became intensely competitive. Market forces shook CMIE's hitherto monopolistic pace.

CMIE's first foray into offering its enterprises database – CIMM (Corporate Information on Magnetic Media) in the late 1980s was quickly beaten by competition in the early 1990s. CMIE relaunched the database in the late 1990s, re-christened as Prowess and regained a leadership in a highly fragmented market for databases on enterprises.

Prowess contains data on the financial performance of companies for over fifty thousand companies. Prowess is a database base of the profit and loss statements, balance sheet, financial ratios, shareholding pattern, board of directors, equity prices and total returns and other market-based ratios. Prowess is a standardised database with trace-back to original values and has a long time-series from 1990. Prowess is the largest database of standardised information and with the longest time-series. The database is delivered in the form of multiple services. ProwessIQ is a querying packaging of the data, PACE is for credit evaluation and ProwessDX is for research applications.

The second proprietary database from CMIE is CapEx which tracks the life cycle of new investment projects from their announcement through their conclusion. CapEx was launched in 1997 but has its antecedents in CMIE's Shape of Things to Come compilation created by DJ Unakar in the 1970s.

CMIE started work on creating a database of the wellbeing of households in 2006. The sample, execution machinery and delivery were completely revamped in 2012 and 2013. The work, Consumer Pyramids Household Survey (CPHS), is India's largest panel survey of households. The sample size is 176,600 households. The full sample is surveyed in Waves lasting 4 months each. This is a continuous household survey since January 2014. CMIE had conducted 22 Waves since then, as of June 2021. CPHS collects data on household member details such as age, gender, religion, caste, education, occupation, employment status, financial inclusion and income. For the household as a whole it collects data on household income, consumption expenditure, amenities and ownership of assets. CPHS is the brainchild of Mahesh Vyas. CMIE makes the anonymised unit level data from CPHS available to researchers.

CMIE's primary databases have focused on the demand side of the Indian economy.

CMIE maintains a long-running time-series database based on official data. These secondary databases draw on data published periodically by the Ministry of Statistics and Programme Implementation, by economic ministries, RBI, stock exchanges and other sources.

The secondary databases also include derivative databases from CMIE's own primary databases. Aggregates from Prowess, CapEx and CPHS.

Collectively, perhaps, CMIE is the largest depository of data on the World economy in India.
