= Malevolent Republic =

2019 non-fiction book by K. S. Komireddi

Malevolent Republic: A Short History of the New India
- First edition
- Author: K.S. Komireddi
- Publisher: C. Hurst & Co.
- ISBN: 978-93-87894-96-9

Malevolent Republic: A Short History of the New India is a book by Indian author K. S. Komireddi, which chronicles the rise of Hindu Nationalism in India and expands upon the circumstances that led to it. The book received a positive reception from various sources.
