= Motion of no confidence in India =

In India, a motion of no confidence, also called vote of no confidence/no trust or a floor test, is a motion of no confidence initiated in the Lok Sabha or in a state legislative assembly, to determine the confidence of the House in the Council of Ministers. If the motion is passed by a majority of the members of the house, all the ministers are expected to resign on moral grounds. When a similar motion is moved by a minister to prove their command of confidence, it is called motion of confidence/vote of trust.

== List ==
=== Lok Sabha – No Confidence Motions ===
Major No Confidence Motions in Lok Sabha
Year	Prime Minister	Party/Alliance in Power	Outcome	Notes
1963	Jawaharlal Nehru	Indian National Congress	Survived	First-ever no-confidence motion post Sino-Indian War.
1979	Morarji Desai	Janata Party	Resigned	Resigned before vote; Janata Party split.
1993	P. V. Narasimha Rao	Indian National Congress	Survived	Narrow victory; allegations of bribery.
2003	Atal Bihari Vajpayee	National Democratic Alliance	Survived	Motion moved by Sonia Gandhi.
2008	Manmohan Singh	INC-led UPA	Survived	Over Indo-US Nuclear Deal.
2018	Narendra Modi	National Democratic Alliance	Survived	Moved by TDP over the non-allocation of funds to the state of Andhra Pradesh NDA won with 325 votes.
2023	Narendra Modi	National Democratic Alliance	Survived	Moved by Gaurav Gogoi over the ethnic violence in the state of Manipur. Defeated by a voice vote after Opposition walkout.

=== State Assemblies – No Confidence Motions ===
Major No Confidence Motions in State Assemblies
Year	State	Chief Minister	Party/Alliance in Power	Outcome	Notes
1964	Kerala	R. Sankar	INC	Resigned	On 8 September 1964, a no-confidence motion was put to vote with 73 Members voting for it and 50 Members voting against it. The motion was declared as carried and the Chief Minister resigned. Governor's rule was imposed with only 6 months left for the term of the assembly to expire. Elections were held as per schedule in March 1965, which led to a hung assembly.
1973	Tamil Nadu	M. Karunanidhi	DMK	Survived	Congress (Indira) withdrew support.
1982	Kerala	K. Karunakaran	INC (UDF)	Survived (Chief Minister resigned after a month)	On February 2, 1982, a no-confidence motion was put to vote with 70 members each voting for and against the motion. Then Speaker exercised casting vote against the motion under Art. 189 of the constitution and the motion was declared as lost. In March 1982, a legislator defected to the opposition following which the Chief Minister resigned, leading to the imposition of Governor's rule. Subsequently, an early election was held in May 1982 which the UDF won.
1984	Andhra Pradesh	N. T. Rama Rao	TDP	Reinstated	Dismissed by Governor; reinstated under public pressure.
1998	Uttar Pradesh	Kalyan Singh	BJP-led coalition	Survived	Faced instability due to alliance issues.
2005	Bihar	Nitish Kumar	JD(U)–BJP	Resigned	Failed to prove majority in 7 days.
2011	Andhra Pradesh	N. Kiran Kumar Reddy	Indian National Congress	Survived	N. Chandrababu Naidu, the Leader of the Opposition, introduced a no-confidence motion against the government. After a 16 hour debate, voting took place at around 1am on 6 December 2011. The government survived the motion, with 160 members voting against and 122 in favour.
2016	Uttarakhand	Harish Rawat	INC	Reinstated	SC restored government after President's Rule.
2016	Arunachal Pradesh	Nabam Tuki	INC	Lost	Rebel faction supported BJP.
2020	Madhya Pradesh	Kamal Nath	INC	Resigned	22 MLAs defected to BJP.
2020	Rajasthan	Ashok Gehlot	INC	Survived	Rebellion by Sachin Pilot faction.
2023	Maharashtra	Eknath Shinde	BJP–Shiv Sena (Shinde faction)	Survived	Toppled Maha Vikas Aghadi government.

== See also ==
- 2008 vote of confidence in the Manmohan Singh ministry
