= Government of the 34th Dáil =

Government of Ireland since 2025

- Cabinet of Ireland
- 2025–present
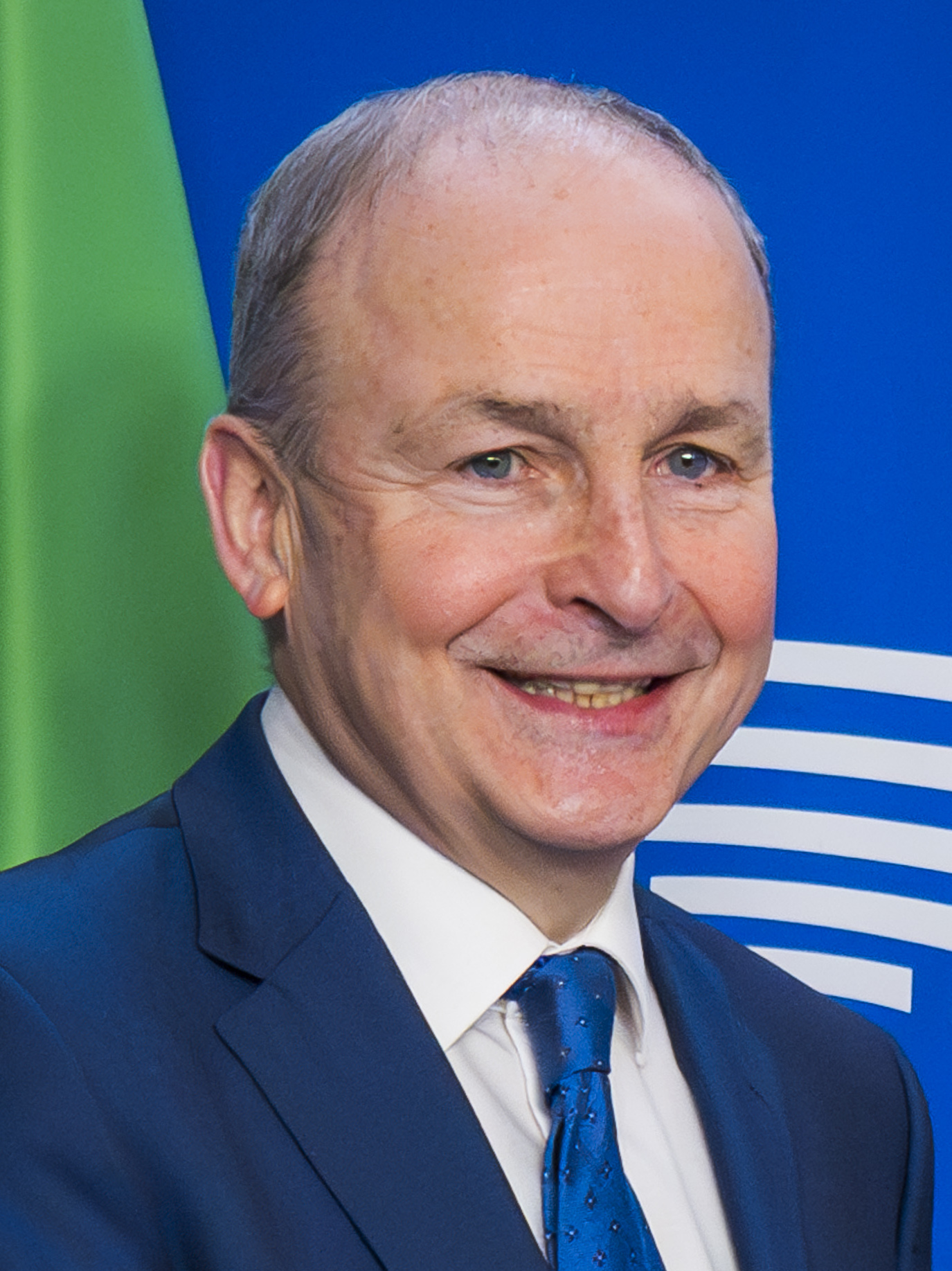
- Martin in 2025
- Date formed: 23 January 2025

People and organisations
- President: Michael D. Higgins (2025); Catherine Connolly (2025–present)
- Taoiseach: Micheál Martin
- Tánaiste: Simon Harris
- Member party: Fianna Fáil; Fine Gael
- Status in legislature: Majority Coalition
- Opposition cabinet: Third McDonald front bench
- Opposition party: Sinn Féin
- Opposition leader: Mary Lou McDonald

History
- Election: 2024 general election
- Legislature terms: 34th Dáil; 27th Seanad
- Budgets: 2026; 2027
- Predecessor: 34th government

The 35th government of Ireland is the government of Ireland which was formed on 23 January 2025 following the 2024 general election to the 34th Dáil held on 29 November 2024. It is a coalition government of Fianna Fáil and Fine Gael with the participation of independent TDs at the rank of minister of state. It has lasted 1 year, 288 days to date.

== Government formation talks ==
Government formation followed negotiations on a programme for government for a coalition government of Fianna Fáil, Fine Gael and the Regional Independent Group (a group of independent politicians led by former government minister Michael Lowry). Fianna Fáil leader Micheál Martin will serve as Taoiseach, with Fine Gael leader Simon Harris serving as Tánaiste. It was agreed that the government will last until November 2027, after which the positions will rotate, with the Fine Gael leader forming a new government as Taoiseach, and the Fianna Fáil leader serving as Tánaiste.

It is the second time that Fianna Fáil and Fine Gael have participated in the same government; the two parties were in government during the lifetime of the previous Dáil, from June 2020 to January 2025, with the Green Party.

== Nomination of Taoiseach ==
The 34th Dáil first met on 18 December. Harris resigned as Taoiseach before the Dáil convened. Under the provisions of Article 28.11 of the Constitution, the members of the government continued to carry out their duties until their successors were appointed. Sinn Féin leader Mary Lou McDonald was proposed for nomination as Taoiseach, with other parties abstaining from nomination as the government formation talks had not yet concluded. McDonald failed to obtain majority support.

On 22 January 2025, the Dáil again met to consider nominations for the position of Taoiseach. Opposition parties raised the issue of a technical group supporting the programme for government registering as an opposition group with speaking rights. Amid chaotic scenes, the Dáil was suspended three times before Ceann Comhairle Verona Murphy suspended sitting for the day. Micheál Martin said the failure to elect a Taoiseach was "the subversion of the Irish constitution" and a "premeditated" and "coordinated" effort by the opposition, adding it was the first time in over 100 years that the Dáil had failed to elect a government.

On 23 January 2025, following talks between party leaders, the Dáil again sat to consider the nomination of the Taoiseach. Micheál Martin and Mary Lou McDonald were proposed, with the nomination of Martin approved by a vote of 95 to 76. The nomination of Mary Lou McDonald was not considered. President Michael D. Higgins signed the warrant of appointment and presented the seal of Taoiseach and the seal of Government to Martin at Áras an Uachtaráin.

23 January 2025; Nomination of Micheál Martin (FF) as Taoiseach; Motion proposed by Albert Dolan and seconded by Catherine Ardagh; Absolute majority: 88/174
Vote	Parties	Votes
Yes	Fianna Fáil (48), Fine Gael (37), Independents (10)	95 / 174
No	Sinn Féin (39), Labour (11), Social Democrats (9), Independents (6), Independent Ireland (4), PBP–Solidarity (3), Aontú (2), 100% Redress (1), Green Party (1)	76 / 174
Absent or not voting	Ceann Comhairle (1), Fine Gael (1), Social Democrats (1)	3 / 174

== Government ministers ==
After his appointment as Taoiseach by the president, Martin proposed the members of the government and they were approved by the Dáil. They were appointed by the president on the same day.

=== Appointments 23 January 2025 ===
Office	Name	Term	Party
Taoiseach	Micheál Martin	2025–present	Fianna Fáil
Tánaiste	Simon Harris	2025–present	Fine Gael
Minister for Foreign Affairs and Trade (Note: The Department of Foreign Affairs was renamed the Department of Foreign Affairs and Trade on 26 March 2025.)	Simon Harris	2025	Fine Gael
Minister for Defence	Simon Harris	2025	Fine Gael
Minister for Finance	Paschal Donohoe	2025	Fine Gael
Minister for Public Expenditure, Infrastructure, Public Service Reform and Digitalisation (Note: The Department of Public Expenditure, National Development Plan Delivery and Reform was renamed the Department of Public Expenditure, Infrastructure, Public Service Reform and Digitalisation on 5 June 2025.)	Jack Chambers	2025–present	Fianna Fáil
Minister for Education and Youth (Note: The Department of Education was renamed the Department of Education and Youth on 2 May 2025.)	Helen McEntee	2025	Fine Gael
Minister for Climate, Energy and the Environment (Note: The Department of the Environment, Climate and Communications was renamed the Department of Climate, Energy and the Environment on 2 June 2025.)	Darragh O'Brien	2025–present	Fianna Fáil
Minister for Transport	Darragh O'Brien	2025–present	Fianna Fáil
Minister for Children, Disability and Equality (Note: The Department of Children, Equality, Disability, Integration and Youth was renamed the Department of Children, Disability and Equality on 2 May 2025.)	Norma Foley	2025–present	Fianna Fáil
Minister for Enterprise, Tourism and Employment (Note: The Department of Enterprise, Trade and Employment was renamed the Department of Enterprise, Tourism and Employment on 2 June 2025.)	Peter Burke	2025–present	Fine Gael
Minister for Social Protection	Dara Calleary	2025–present	Fianna Fáil
Minister for Rural and Community Development and the Gaeltacht (Note: The Department of Rural and Community Development was renamed the Department of Rural and Community Development and the Gaeltacht on 2 June 2025.)	Dara Calleary	2025–present	Fianna Fáil
Minister for Culture, Communications and Sport (Note: The Department of Tourism, Culture, Arts, Gaeltacht, Sport and Media was renamed the Department of Culture, Communications and Sport on 2 June 2025.)	Patrick O'Donovan	2025–2026	Fine Gael
Minister for Health	Jennifer Carroll MacNeill	2025–present	Fine Gael
Minister for Housing, Local Government and Heritage	James Browne	2025–present	Fianna Fáil
Minister for Justice, Home Affairs and Migration (Note: The Department of Justice was renamed the Department of Justice, Home Affairs and Migration on 5 June 2025.)	Jim O'Callaghan	2025–present	Fianna Fáil
Minister for Agriculture, Food and the Marine	Martin Heydon	2025–present	Fine Gael
Minister for Further and Higher Education, Research, Innovation and Science	James Lawless	2025–present	Fianna Fáil
=== Change 18 November 2025 === Following the resignation of Paschal Donohoe to take a position at the World Bank.
Office	Name	Term	Party
Minister for Finance	Simon Harris	2025–present	Fine Gael
Minister for Foreign Affairs and Trade	Helen McEntee	2025–present	Fine Gael
Minister for Defence	Helen McEntee	2025–present	Fine Gael
Minister for Education and Youth	Hildegarde Naughton	2025–present	Fine Gael
=== Change 2 November 2026 === Following the illness of Patrick O'Donovan.
Office	Name	Term	Party
Minister without portfolio	Patrick O'Donovan	2026–present	Fine Gael
Minister for Culture, Communications and Sport	Peter Burke	2026–present	Fine Gael

== Attorney General ==
Rossa Fanning SC was appointed by the president as Attorney General on the nomination of the Taoiseach.

== Ministers of state ==
=== Appointments on 23 January 2025 === On 23 January 2025, the government on the nomination of the taoiseach appointed Mary Butler, Hildegarde Naughton, Noel Grealish, and Seán Canney as ministers of state to be in attendance at meetings of the government.
Name	Department(s)	Responsibility	Party
Mary Butler	Taoiseach; Health	Government Chief Whip; Mental Health	Fianna Fáil
Hildegarde Naughton	Children, Disability and Equality	Disability	Fine Gael
Noel Grealish	Agriculture, Food and the Marine	Food promotion, new markets, research and development	Independent
Seán Canney	Transport	International and road transport, logistics, rail and ports	Independent
=== Appointments on 29 January 2025 === On 29 January, a further sixteen ministers of state were appointed by the government.
Name	Department(s)	Responsibility	Party
Thomas Byrne	Taoiseach; Foreign Affairs and Trade; Defence	European affairs Defence	Fianna Fáil
Michael Moynihan	Education and Youth	Special education and inclusion	Fianna Fáil
Charlie McConalogue	Culture, Communications and Sport	Sport and postal policy	Fianna Fáil
Kevin "Boxer" Moran	Public Expenditure, Infrastructure, Public Service Reform and Digitalisation	Office of Public Works	Independent
Emer Higgins	Public Expenditure, Infrastructure, Public Service Reform and Digitalisation	Public procurement, digitalisation and eGovernment	Fine Gael
Jennifer Murnane O'Connor	Health	Public health, well-being and drugs	Fianna Fáil
Michael Healy-Rae	Agriculture, Food and the Marine	Forestry, farm safety and horticulture	Independent
Neale Richmond	Foreign Affairs and Trade	International development and diaspora	Fine Gael
Jerry Buttimer	Rural and Community Development and the Gaeltacht; Transport	Community development, charities, Gaeltacht and the islands Rural transport	Fine Gael
John Cummins	Housing, Local Government and Heritage	Local government and planning	Fine Gael
Christopher O'Sullivan	Housing, Local Government and Heritage	Nature, heritage and biodiversity	Fianna Fáil
Kieran O'Donnell	Health; Housing, Local Government and Heritage	Older people Housing	Fine Gael
Robert Troy	Finance	Financial services, credit unions and insurance	Fianna Fáil
Niall Collins	Justice, Home Affairs and Migration	International law, law reform and youth justice	Fianna Fáil
Niamh Smyth	Enterprise, Tourism and Employment	Trade promotion, artificial intelligence and digital transformation	Fianna Fáil
Alan Dillon	Enterprise, Tourism and Employment; Climate, Energy and the Environment	Small businesses and retail Circular economy	Fine Gael
=== Appointments on 25 February 2025 === The government appointed three further ministers of state on the enactment of an amendment to the Ministers and Secretaries Acts increasing the number of ministers of state from 20 to 23.
Name	Department(s)	Responsibility	Party
Timmy Dooley	Agriculture, Food and the Marine; Climate, Energy and the Environment	Fisheries; Marine	Fianna Fáil
Colm Brophy	Justice, Home Affairs and Migration	Migration	Fine Gael
Marian Harkin	Further and Higher Education, Research, Innovation and Science	Further education, apprenticeship, construction and climate skills	Independent
=== Changes on 18 November 2025 === Following the appointment of Hildegarde Naughton to government. Emer Higgins was appointed to attend meetings of the government. Frank Feighan was appointed minister of state to take on Higgins's former brief.
Name	Department(s)	Responsibility	Party
Emer Higgins	Children, Disability and Equality	Disability	Fine Gael
Frank Feighan	Public Expenditure, Infrastructure, Public Service Reform and Digitalisation	Public procurement, digitalisation and eGovernment	Fine Gael
=== Resignation on 14 April 2026 === Resignation of Michael Healy-Rae as minister of state during a debate on a motion of confidence in the government, before he voted against the motion which was held following the Irish fuel protests.
=== Changes on 28 May 2026 === Minor reshuffle following resignation.
Name	Department(s)	Responsibility	Party
Catherine Ardagh	Justice, Home Affairs and Migration	International law, law reform and youth justice	Fianna Fáil
Niall Collins	Agriculture, Food and the Marine	Forestry, farm safety and horticulture	Fianna Fáil

== Events affecting the government ==
Prior to the nomination of Taoiseach in 2025, a row ensued after four TDs of the Regional Independent Group (Michael Lowry, Gillian Toole, Barry Heneghan and Danny Healy-Rae) sought to be part of a technical group, granting them Dáil speaking rights and positioning itself on the opposition benches, while also supporting the government. This was rejected by opposition parties, resulting in chaotic exchanges in the Dáil. On 3 February 2025, eleven days after the government was formed, Ceann Comhairle Verona Murphy ruled that the Regional Group could not form a technical group for the purposes of speaking rights. This was welcomed by opposition parties. The next day, the Regional Independent Group and government parties conceded and said they would not challenge Murphy's ruling.

However, on 25 March, angry and chaotic exchanges broke out in the Dáil again leading Ceann Comhairle Verona Murphy to adjourn the session after the government won a vote to change standing orders which allowed the Regional Independents' technical group, coalition backbenchers and government-aligned independents additional speaking time in the Dáil, a reduction in time for debating the order of business and halving Taoiseach's Questions time. Taoiseach Micheál Martin defended the changes, stating that they did not alter Opposition speaking time or reduce government accountability, dismissing Opposition reactions as "wholly disproportionate." Sinn Féin leader Mary Lou McDonald strongly criticised the move, calling it an "absurd brazen stroke" that would undermine the Dáil. The following day, the Opposition parties informed Murphy that they had no confidence in her to perform the role of Ceann Comhairle and that she had a week to consider resigning before they tabled an official motion of no confidence in her. The vote was held on 1 April 2025, with Murphy retaining her position as Ceann Comhairle by 96 votes to 71.

On 12 April 2026, a joint motion of no confidence in the government was tabled by opposition parties in the aftermath of fuel protests which had caused widespread disruption to transport networks, fuel supply chains and economic activity in the country. The motion gained support from Labour, the Social Democrats, People Before Profit, the Green Party, Aontú, Independent Ireland, Sinn Féin and 100% Redress. Taoiseach Micheál Martin and other ministers faced criticism from backbenchers during a meeting held on the same day, with Martin being described to be "very out of touch" and "very narky". On 14 April, the government moved a counter-motion of confidence. During the debate, Michael Healy-Rae, an independent TD for Kerry, tendered his resignation as Minister of State at the Department of Agriculture, Food and the Marine, and declared that he would vote against the government, saying that it had "let the people of Ireland down". His brother, Danny Healy-Rae, also voted no confidence in the government.

== Motions of confidence ==
On 15 October 2025, a motion of confidence in the Tánaiste Simon Harris proposed by Taoiseach Micheál Martin was approved with 94 votes in favour to 65 against, with one abstention.

On 14 April 2026, a motion of confidence in the government proposed by Taoiseach Micheál Martin was approved with 92 votes in favour to 78 against.
