= 2027 Irish budget =

Budget 2027
- Presented: 6 October 2026
- Country: Ireland
- Parliament: 34th Dáil
- Government: 35th government of Ireland
- Party: Fine Gael; Fianna Fáil; Regional Independent Group
- Minister for Finance: Simon Harris (FG)
- Minister for Public Expenditure, Infrastructure, Public Service Reform and Digitalisation: Jack Chambers (FF)

Budget 2027 was presented to Dáil Éireann on 6 October 2026 by Tánaiste and Minister for Finance Simon Harris and Minister for Public Expenditure, Infrastructure, Public Service Reform and Digitalisation Jack Chambers.

== Summary ==
Budget 2027 included changes to personal taxation, social protection, housing, childcare and other areas of public spending.

Personal taxation measures included a €2,500 increase in the standard rate income tax band, bringing the point at which a single person begins paying the 40% rate to €46,500. The personal, employee and earned income tax credits were each increased by €125 to €2,125. The 2% Universal Social Charge band was also widened, while the national minimum wage was increased by €0.79 to €14.94 per hour from January 2027.

Housing measures included an increase in the Rent Tax Credit to €1,150 for an individual and €2,300 for a jointly assessed couple. The maximum relief available under the Help to Buy scheme was increased from €30,000 to €35,000.

Social protection measures included a €10 weekly increase in core welfare payments and pensions. The Budget also introduced a €500 annual cost-of-disability payment for recipients of long-term disability payments and increased the weekly Fuel Allowance.

== Key measures ==
=== Personal taxation ===
- Standard rate income tax band increased by €2,500 to €46,500 for a single person.
- Personal, employee and earned income tax credits increased by €125 to €2,125.
- Home Carer Tax Credit increased by €100.
- Entry threshold for the 3% Universal Social Charge band increased.
- Capital Gains Tax rate reduced from 33% to 31%.
- Capital Acquisitions Tax Group A threshold increased to €420,000.

The impact of the Budget 2027 income tax changes varies depending on income, marital status and individual circumstances. KPMG in Ireland published an updated Income Tax Calculator following the Budget to allow users to estimate their tax position and take-home pay under the new measures.

=== Housing ===
- Rent Tax Credit increased to €1,150 for an individual and €2,300 for a jointly assessed couple.
- Maximum Help to Buy relief increased from €30,000 to €35,000.
- Rent-a-Room Relief threshold increased to €16,000.
- Measures were introduced relating to residential development, vacant property and housing supply.

=== Social protection and families ===
- Core weekly social welfare payments and pensions increased by €10.
- Fuel Allowance increased by €5 per week.
- Living Alone Allowance increased by €3 per week.
- Child Support Payment increased by €6 per week.
- Working Family Payment income thresholds increased by €30.
- A new annual €500 cost-of-disability payment was introduced for recipients of qualifying long-term disability payments.
- Childcare costs under the National Childcare Scheme were reduced, with the maximum monthly fee set at €550.

=== Health ===
Health spending was increased by €1.6 billion, bringing the annual health budget to €29.1 billion. The Budget included measures to expand access to out-of-hours GP services and children's dental care, extend the free contraception scheme to women aged up to 37, and provide an additional 1.8 million home-help hours for older people.

=== Mental Health ===
Mental health funding increased by €108 million to €1.657 billion for 2027. The additional funding included provision for six new Solace crisis cafés, bringing the national total to 15.

=== Other measures ===
- National minimum wage increased by €0.79 to €14.94 per hour from January 2027.
- Maximum annual third-level student contribution reduced by €150 to €2,350.
- Additional funding was allocated to health, education, housing, infrastructure and public services.
- Additional teaching and special needs assistant posts were funded.
- Funding was provided for enterprise, tourism, regional development, digitalisation and artificial intelligence initiatives.
- Employer PRSI threshold for the lower contribution rate increased from €552 to €600 per week.

== Reaction ==
=== Fiscal policy ===
The Irish Fiscal Advisory Council criticised the Budget, warning that it would put the public finances on a worse trajectory and increase the State's reliance on volatile corporation tax receipts.

=== Political reaction ===
Opposition parties also criticised the package, while Government ministers defended the measures as an attempt to balance tax reductions, additional public spending and support for households.

=== Corporation tax ===
Post-Budget analysis also focused on Ireland's dependence on corporation tax receipts from multinational companies, with €23 billion of corporation tax revenue categorised by the Department of Finance as transient.

=== Business reaction ===
Chambers Ireland welcomed measures relating to infrastructure, education and training, but said Budget 2027 did not fully address the rising costs facing businesses.
