= Garda Operational Support =

Garda Operational Support (formally Special Services) is a section of the Garda Síochána responsible for providing support services to policing in Ireland. Operational Support is operationally under the authority of Garda National Support Services branch and is headed by a Superintendent.

== Overview ==
Operational Support, which provides specialist support to Gardaí nationwide, is divided into four units. They are:

- Air Support Unit
- Dog Support Unit
- Mounted Support Unit
- Water Support Unit
