= Garda Public Order Unit =

Irish policing function

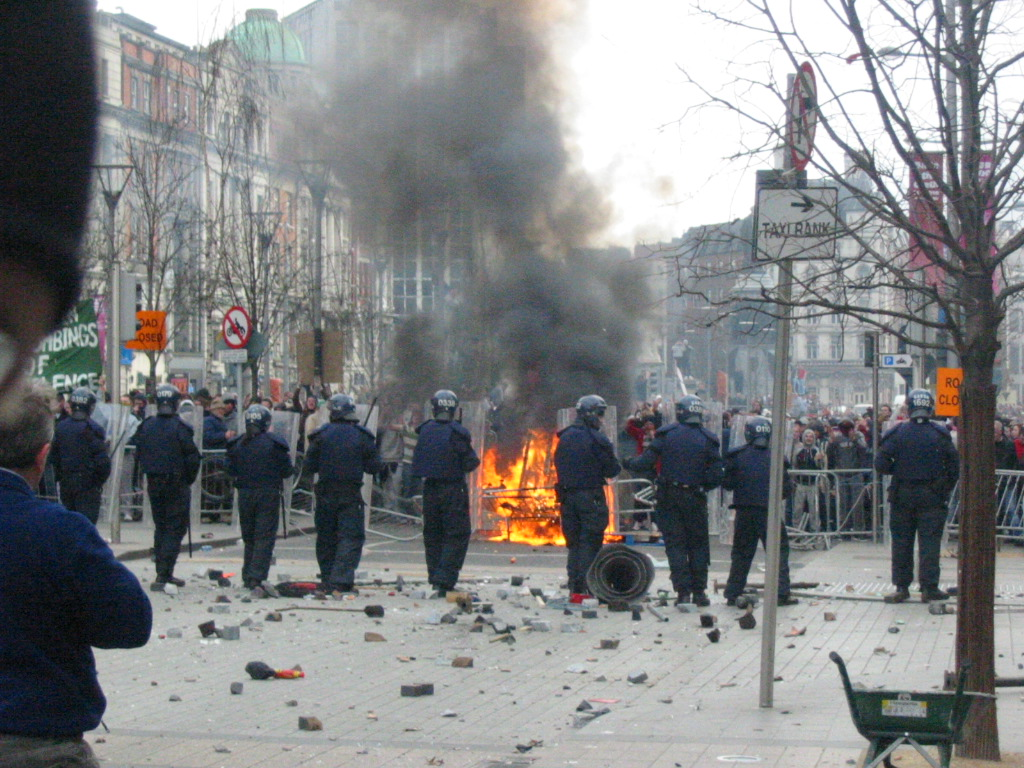
The Public Order Unit on O'Connell Street during the 2006 Dublin Riots

The Garda Public Order Unit – commonly known as the Garda Riot Squad – is a unit of the Garda Síochána, Ireland's police force, that deals with public disorder, including riots and protests.

== Staffing and training ==
All gardaí assigned to Public Order Units are standard uniformed members assigned to normal policing duties with specialist Public Order training. The unit is trained to use riot control tactics to control, disperse, and arrest civilians that are involved in a riot, demonstration, or protest.

== Equipment ==
As with ordinary uniformed members of the Garda Síochána, the Public Order Unit do not routinely carry firearms, relying instead on conventional, non-lethal weapons such as pepper spray and batons. Members of the unit typically wear body armour, riot helmets, and carry riot shields. Full-length riot shields are also used during potentially violent confrontations where there is large hostile crowds, or the risk of thrown or flammable projectiles.

In 2016 it was reported that riot gear orders had included contracts for 26-inch batons, riot gloves and boots, and protective flame-retardant clothing. If a situation escalates whereby an armed response is required, the Garda Regional Support Unit (RSU) or Garda Emergency Response Unit (ERU) will be called in to assist.

=== Uniforms ===
Gardaí assigned to Public Order Units typically wear black flame-retardant coveralls, standard issue stab-resistant vests and navy baseball caps with "GARDA" on both the front and back, and "PUBLIC ORDER" along the sides in yellow.

Where there is a heightened risk of violence or attack with burning projectiles, such as Molotov cocktails, stab vests are worn under the coveralls and navy blue riot protection helmets with face shields and protective gloves are worn.

For protection in violent situations, an additional layer of flame-retardant body armor designed for public order use, complete with shoulder pads may be worn along with shin and forearm protectors. In September 2018 the Garda Commissioner was obliged to issue a directive confirming that the Public Order Unit's flame retardant hoods were intended to be worn only when a helmet was also worn - when it was queried why some unit members had worn hoods during a public order policing incident in Dublin.

=== Vehicles ===
The Public Order Unit operates two Iveco water cannon trucks, which were delivered in February 2025 as part of a €3.2 million upgrade in public order policing following the 2023 Dublin riot. The water cannons hold up to 5,200 litres (1,100 imp gal; 1,400 US gal) of water, which can be expelled through two nozzles on the roof of the vehicle. The vehicle also has a large speaker mounded to the cab to broadcast messages. Prior to their delivery, arrangements were made with the Police Service of Northern Ireland to hire two of their Somati RCV9000 GINAF water cannons at short notice.

The Public Order Unit also has a fleet of refitted commercial vans. These Ford Transit vehicles are typically longer wheelbase versions of the standard Ford Transit van used by gardaí for patrol. They do not have a prisoner cage and carry Public Order Unit markings. Previously, Transit vans were equipped with a raiseable and removable windscreen protection cage and removable cages fitted over other windows. However, vehicles ordered in 2015, to replace the aging 2007 fleet, opted instead for specially designed and strengthened windscreens.

As part of the upgrade of the Garda Public Order Unit, fifteen additional vans entered service in 2024. These new Ford Transit vans are fitted with a raisable windscreen protection cage on the windscreen and cages on the side windows. The new vans use Battenberg markings, similar to other newer marked Garda vehicles.

== Deployment ==
Typically the unit is only called up for riot situations or pre-planned situations such as major sporting events, protests or large-scale public events such as concerts, St. Patrick's Day or Halloween. In some other cases the Public Order unit has been deployed on more frequent or recurring basis during times of increased risk of disturbances. Examples include the days preceding high-tension international football games, or during the 2016 build-up to the 1916 Centenary celebrations.

=== Dublin ===
Two full serials patrol Dublin city centre on Friday, Saturday and Sunday nights, providing support to regular patrol Gardaí. One vehicle operates from Pearse Street Garda station on the south side of the River Liffey and one from the Bridewell Garda station, the latter previously being deployed in response to a violent attack on two uniformed gardaí in the area. Similar resources are deployed across Dublin on Halloween due to a spike in anti-social behaviour, illegal bonfires, attacks against Gardaí and the Dublin Fire Brigade and other related activity.

== Notable operations ==
- In 1995, the unit dealt with rioting English football hooligans (including many members of Combat 18) during a friendly soccer match between the Republic of Ireland and England in Lansdowne Road.
- In 2006, the unit was involved in the 2006 Dublin riots, and were deployed to deal with rioters in Dublin city centre. Some members of the unit were injured during the riots, which lasted several hours.
- In July 2008, members of the unit along with the Air Support Unit and Dog Unit assisted local Gardaí when a feud between two Traveller families broke into a riot in Dalton Park, Mullingar.
- In November 2014, the Public Order Unit were present during a protest against water-charges in Jobstown, Tallaght in which protesters were later 'charged with falsely imprisoning then tánaiste Joan Burton'.
- In November 2023, the Public Order Unit were present during a riot which followed a stabbing incident in Dublin city centre.
- In October 2025, the unit were deployed during a series of violent protests outside the Citywest IPAS centre following an incident near the centre.

== See also ==
- Territorial Support Group (Metropolitan Police Service)
- Emergency Management and Public Order Unit (Toronto Police Services)
