= Mulroy (surname) =

Mulroy is an Irish surname.

- Garth Mulroy (born 1978), South African professional golfer
- James Mulroy (1899–1986), Irish police officer
- Jimmy Mulroy (1940–2013), Irish Gaelic footballer, manager, and politician
- John Mulroy (footballer) (born 1989), Irish footballer
- John H. Mulroy (1925–1999), American politician
- Michael Patrick Mulroy (born 1901), Senior National Security Official
- Sam Mulroy, Gaelic footballer
- Steven J. Mulroy (born 1964), Shelby County, Tennessee district attorney
- Tom Mulroy (born 1956), American soccer executive

== See also ==
- Mulroy (disambiguation)
- Milroy (name)
