= Milroy =

Milroy may refer to:

== People ==
Milroy (name), a list of people with the name

== Places ==
=== Australia ===
- Milroy, New South Wales

=== United States ===
- Milroy, Illinois, in Oquawka Township, Henderson County, Illinois
- Milroy, Indiana
- Milroy Township, Jasper County, Indiana
- Milroy, Minnesota
- Milroy, an unincorporated community in McHenry County, North Dakota
- Milroy, Pennsylvania
- Milroy Township, in Grant County, West Virginia
- Fort Milroy, in Randolph County, West Virginia

== Other ==
- A horse in the American Civil War

== See also ==
- Millroy
