= Garda Technical Bureau =

- Irish: Biúró Teicniúil an Gharda Síochána

Agency overview
- Jurisdiction: Ireland
- Headquarters: Garda Headquarters, Phoenix Park, Dublin
- Employees: >130
- Annual budget: Undisclosed (part of Garda Síochána budget, >€2 billion in 2022)
- Minister responsible: Helen McEntee, TD, Minister for Justice, Home Affairs and Migration
- Agency executive: Justin Kelly, Garda Commissioner; Assistant Commissioner of National Support Services; Detective Chief Superintendent in charge of the Technical Bureau
- Parent agency: National Support Services; Garda Síochána
- Website: Official website

The Garda Technical Bureau (Irish: Biúró Teicniúil an Gharda Síochána) is the longest established specialist unit in the Garda Síochána, the police and security service of the Ireland. The bureau, based at Garda headquarters in the Phoenix Park, comprises eight sections, each providing a specialist service to the wider Garda Síochána:

1. Photography
2. Mapping
3. Fingerprinting
4. Forensic Document Examination
5. Ballistics
6. Forensic Liaison Office
7. Fógra Tóra (Garda information booklet)
8. Administration
