= List of Garda districts =

Map of garda divisions (as of January 2025)

Some areas of the Garda Síochána have been split into modified divisions and districts since the pilot of the new Garda Operating Model came into effect on Monday, 7 October 2019. The rollout started with Galway, Cork City, Dublin South Central, Meath/Westmeath and Limerick and has continued since March 2020. In the Dublin Metropolitan Region (DMR) each district is assigned a unique letter which are listed in the table below. Outside of the DMR, letters are assigned by division.

== Dublin Metropolitan Region ==
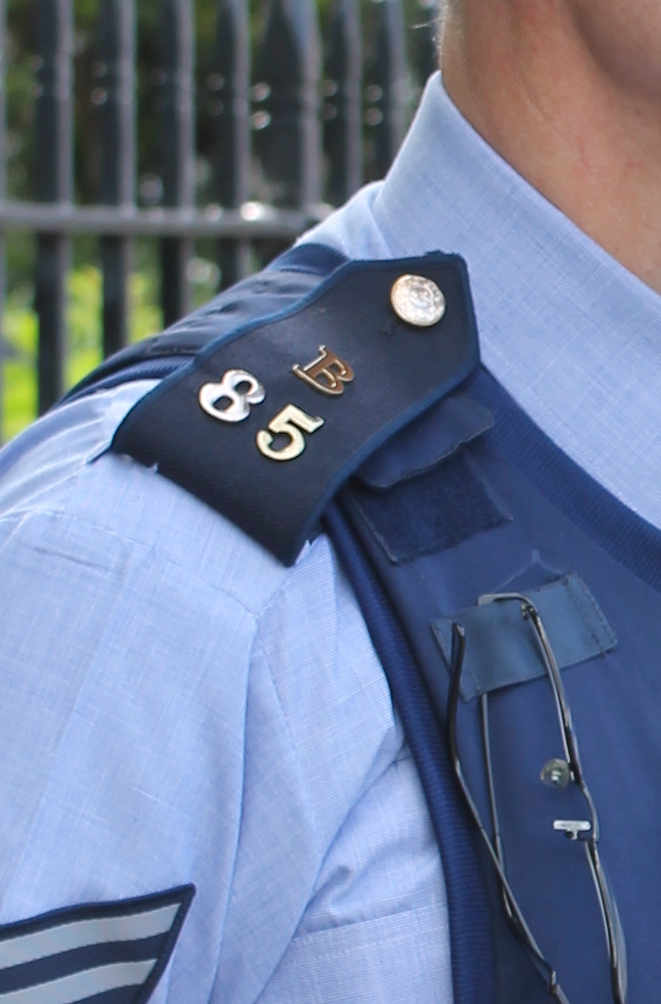
The epaulette worn by gardaí show the District/Region letter, as well as a number unique to each garda

District	Division	Letter	Stations	Members (February 2025)
Kevin Street	South Central	A	Kevin Street, Kilmainham	270
Pearse Street	South Central	B	Pearse Street	246
Store Street	North Central	C	O'Connell Street, Store Street	300
Bridewell	North Central	D	Bridewell	166
Donnybrook	South Central	E	Donnybrook, Irishtown	136
Dún Laoghaire	East	F	Cabinteely, Dún Laoghaire, Shankill	176
Crumlin	South	G	Crumlin, Sundrive Road	144
Ballymun	North	H	Ballymun, Dublin Airport, Santry	265
Raheny	North	J	Clontarf, Howth, Raheny	148
Blanchardstown	West	K	Blanchardstown, Cabra, Finglas	351
Clondalkin	West	L	Ballyfermot, Clondalkin, Rathcoole	199
Tallaght	South	M	Rathfarnham, Tallaght	272
Terenure	South	P	Rathmines, Terenure	128
Lucan	West	Q	Lucan, Ronanstown	193
Coolock	North	R	Coolock, Malahide, Swords	229
Traffic	Regional Roads Policing	T	Dublin Castle	92
Fitzgibbon Street	North Central	U	Fitzgibbon Street, Mountjoy	196
Blackrock	East	W	Blackrock, Dundrum, Stepaside	164
Balbriggan	North	Y	Balbriggan, Garristown, Lusk, Rush, Skerries	126
Source: "Garda Workforce". gov.ie. Department of Justice, Home Affairs and Migration. 18 August 2025 [2019-02-08].

== Eastern Region ==
Division	District	Letters	Stations	Members (February 2026)
Kildare	Kildare	KE	Athy, Castledermot, Kildare, Monastrevin, Newbridge, Rathangan	161
Kildare	Leixlip	KE	Carbury, Celbridge, Kilcock, Leixlip, Maynooth	121
Kildare	Naas	KE	Clane, Kilcullen, Naas, Robertstown	181
Kilkenny/Carlow	Carlow	KC	Borris, Carlow, Hacketstown, Muinebheag, Myshall, Rathvilly, Tullow	101
Kilkenny/Carlow	Kilkenny	KC	Callan, Castlecomer, Freshford, Kilkenny, Urlingford	163
Kilkenny/Carlow	Thomastown	KC	Ballyhale, Bennetsbridge, Glenmore, Goresbridge, Graiguenamanagh, Kilmoganny, Mooncoin, Mullinavat, Piltown, Stonyford, Thomastown	61
Laois/Offaly	Birr	LY	Banagher, Birr, Cloghan, Ferbane, Kilcormac, Kinnitty, Shinrone	51
Laois/Offaly	Portlaoise	LY	Abbeyleix, Arles, Ballylinan, Borris-in-Ossory, Clonaslee, Durrow, Mountmellick, Mountrath, Portarlington, Portlaoise, Rathdowney, Stradbally	241
Laois/Offaly	Tullamore	LY	Clara, Daingean, Edenderry, Rhode, Tullamore	113
Meath/Westmeath	Ashbourne	MH	Ashbourne, Duleek, Dunboyne, Dunshaughlin, Laytown	125
Meath/Westmeath	Athlone	WH	Athlone, Ballymore, Glasson, Kilbeggan, Moate	119
Meath/Westmeath	Kells	MH	Baile Átha Buí, Kells, Oldcastle	39
Meath/Westmeath	Mullingar	WH	Ballynacargy, Castlepollard, Delvin, Killucan, Kinnegad, Mullingar, Multyfarnham, Rochfortbridge	120
Meath/Westmeath	Navan	MH	Navan, Nobber, Slane	119
Meath/Westmeath	Trim	MH	Ballivor, Enfield, Longwood, Summerhill, Trim	45
Waterford	Dungarvan	WD	Aglish, An Rinn, Ardmore, Ballymacarberry, Cappoquin, Dungarvan, Lismore, Tallow	64
Waterford	Tramore	WD	Kilmacthomas, Portlaw, Tramore	56
Waterford	Waterford	WD	Dunmore East, Ferrybank, Passage East, Waterford	224
Wexford/Wicklow	Baltinglass	WW	Baltinglass, Blessington, Carnew, Dunlavin, Shillelagh, Tinahely	66
Wexford/Wicklow	Bray	WW	Bray, Enniskerry, Greystones, Newtownmountkennedy	124
Wexford/Wicklow	Enniscorthy	WX	Blackwater, Bunclody, Clonroche, Courtown Harbour, Enniscorthy, Ferns, Gorey, Oulart, Oylegate	124
Wexford/Wicklow	New Ross	WX	Ballycullane, Campile, Carrickbyrne, Carrick-on-Bannow, Duncannon, New Ross	61
Wexford/Wicklow	Wexford	WX	Castlebridge, Glynn, Kilmore Quay, Rosslare Harbour, Rosslare Strand, Taghmon, Wexford	156
Wexford/Wicklow	Wicklow	WW	Arklow, Ashford, Aughrim, Avoca, Rathdrum, Roundwood, Wicklow	98
Source: www.gov.ie

== North Western Region ==
Division	District	Letters	Stations	Members (February 2026)
Louth/Cavan/Monaghan	Ardee	LH	Ardee, Castlebellingham, Collon, Louth	68
Louth/Cavan/Monaghan	Bailieboro	CM	Bailieboro, Ballyjamesduff, Cootehill, Kingscourt, Mullagh, Shercock, Virginia	77
Louth/Cavan/Monaghan	Carrickmacross	CM	Ballybay, Carrickmacross, Castleblaney, Rockcorry	79
Louth/Cavan/Monaghan	Cavan	CM	Arva, Ballinagh, Ballyconnell, Belturbet, Blacklion, Cavan, Dowra, Killeshandra, Kilnaleck, Swanlinbar	103
Louth/Cavan/Monaghan	Drogheda	LH	Clougherhead, Drogheda, Dunleer	153
Louth/Cavan/Monaghan	Dundalk	LH	Blackrock, Carlingford, Drumad, Dundalk, Hackballscross, Omeath	172
Louth/Cavan/Monaghan	Monaghan	CM	Clones, Emyvale, Monaghan, Scotstown	101
Donegal	Ballyshannon	DG	An Charraig, Ard an Rátha, Ballintra, Ballyshannon, Bundoran, Donegal Town, Mountcharles, Na Cealla Beaga, Na Gleannta, Pettigo	87
Donegal	Buncrana	DG	Buncrana, Burnfoot, Carndonagh, Moville, Muff	91
Donegal	Letterkenny	DG	Ballybofey, Carrigans, Castlefin, Convoy, Letterkenny, Lifford, Newtowncunningham, Raphoe	187
Donegal	Milford	DG	An Bun Beag, An Clochán Liath, An Craoslach, An Fál Carrach, Carraig Airt, Dún Fionnachaid, Kerrykeel, Kilmacrennan, Milford	71
Galway	Ballinasloe	GA	Ahascragh, Ballinasloe, Ballygar, Creggs, Kilconnel, Mount Bellew, Moylough	47
Galway	Clifden	GA	An Mám, Carna, Clifden, Cloch Na Rón, Letterfrack	27
Galway	Galway	GA	Athenry, Gaillimh, Lough George, Monivea, Region HQ, Órán Mór	315
Galway	Loughrea	GA	Ardrahan, Craughwell, Eyrecourt, Gort, Killimore, Kilrickle, Kinvara, Loughrea, Portumna, Woodford	79
Galway	Salthill	GA	An Ceathrú Rua, An Spidéal, Cill Rónáin, Indreabhán, Leitir Móir, Maigh Cuilinn, Ros Muc, Salthill, Uachtarard	55
Galway	Tuam	GA	Barnaderg, Corofin, Dunmore, Glenamaddy, Headford, Milltown, Tuam, Williamstown	56
Mayo/Roscommon/Longford	Ballina	MY	Ballina, Bonniconlon, Crossmolina, Foxford, Killala	67
Mayo/Roscommon/Longford	Belmullet	MY	Ballycroy, Bangor Erris, Béal an Mhuirthead, Gleann na Muaidhe	26
Mayo/Roscommon/Longford	Castlebar	MY	Balla, Castlebar, Partry	70
Mayo/Roscommon/Longford	Castlerea	RL	Ballaghaderreen, Ballinlough, Boyle, Castlerea, Elphin, Frenchpark, Keadue, Roosky, Strokestown, Tulsk	67
Mayo/Roscommon/Longford	Claremorris	MY	Ballindine, Ballinrobe, Ballyhaunis, Charlestown, Claremorris, Cong, Kilkelly, Kilmaine, Kiltimagh, Knock, Shrule, Swinford	110
Mayo/Roscommon/Longford	Granard	RL	Drumlish, Edgesworthstown, Granard, Smear	33
Mayo/Roscommon/Longford	Longford	RL	Ballymahon, Kenagh, Lanesboro, Longford	101
Mayo/Roscommon/Longford	Roscommon	RL	Athleague, Clonark, Roscommon	77
Mayo/Roscommon/Longford	Westport	MY	Achill Sound, Keel, Louisburgh, Newport, Westport	42
Sligo/Leitrim	Ballymote	SL	Ballymote, Enniscrone, Gurteen, Riverstown, Tubbercurry	52
Sligo/Leitrim	Leitrim	SL	Ballinamore, Carrick-on-Shannon, Carrigallen, Drumshambo, Kinlough, Manorhamilton, Mohill	101
Sligo/Leitrim	Sligo	SL	Cliffoney, Collooney, Coolaney, Grange, Rosses Point, Skreen, Sligo	141
Source: www.gov.ie

== Southern Region ==
Division	District	Letters	Stations	Members (February 2026)
Clare/Tipperary	Cahir	TY	Ardfinnan, Ballyporeen, Cahir, Cashel, Clogheen	56
Clare/Tipperary	Clonmel	TY	Carrick-on-Suir, Clonmel, Fethard, Kilsheelan, Mullinahone	90
Clare/Tipperary	Ennis	CL	Crusheen, Ennis, Killaloe, Newnmarket on Fergus, Scariff, Shannon, Shannon Airport, Sixmilebridge, Tulla	233
Clare/Tipperary	Kilrush	CL	Ballyvaughan, Corofin, Ennistymon, Kildysart, Kilkee, Kilmihil, Kilrush, Lisdoonvarna, Miltown Malbay	69
Clare/Tipperary	Nenagh	TY	Borrisokane, Cloughjordan, Lorrha, Moneygall, Nenagh, Newport, Portroe, Roscrea, Toomevara	96
Clare/Tipperary	Thurles	TY	Ballingarry South, Borrisoleigh, Holycross, Killenaule, Littleton, Templemore, Templetuohy, Thurles	111
Clare/Tipperary	Tipperary Town	TY	Bansha, Cappawhite, Emly, Golden, Tipperary Town	70
Cork City	Anglesea Street	CC	Anglesea Street, Blackrock, Bridewell	334
Cork City	Gurranabraher	CC	Blarney, Carrig Na Bhfearr, Gurranabraher	80
Cork City	Mayfield	CC	Glanmire, Mallow Road, Mayfield, Watercourse Road	113
Cork City	Togher	CC	Ballincollig, Bishopstown, Carrigaline, Crosshaven, Douglas, Passage West, Togher	182
Cork County	Bandon	CW	Ballineen, Ballinhassig, Ballinspittle, Bandon, Innishannon, Kilbrittain, Kinsale, Timoleague	101
Cork County	Bantry	CW	Bantry, Castletownbere, Drimoleague, Durrus, Glengarrif, Kealkil, Schull	48
Cork County	Clonakilty	CW	Baltimore, Clonkilty, Drinagh, Dunmanway, Rosscarbery, Skibbereen	64
Cork County	Fermoy	CN	Ballynoe, Castletownroche, Fermoy, Kildorrery, Kilworth, Mitchelstown, Rathcormac, Watergrasshill	98
Cork County	Macroom	CW	Baile Bhuirne, Béal Átha an Ghaortha, Boherbue, Coachford, Crookstown, Macroom, Millstreet, Rathmore, Stuake, Tarelton	76
Cork County	Mallow	CN	Buttevant, Charleville, Doneraile, Glantaine, Kanturk, Liscarroll, Mallow, Milford, Newmarket	125
Cork County	Midleton	CN	Ballycotton, Carrigtwohill, Cloyne, Cobh, Killeagh, Midleton, Whitegate, Youghal	118
Kerry	Killarney	KY	Barraduff, Caherciveen, Glenbeigh, Kenmare, Killarney, Killorglin, Portmagee, Sneem, Waterville	126
Kerry	Listowel	KY	Ballybunion, Ballyduff, Ballyheigue, Knocknagoshall, Listowel, Lixnaw, Tarbert	66
Kerry	Tralee	KY	An Daingean, Annascaul, Ardfert, Baile an Fheirtéaraig, Castlegregory, Castleisland, Castlemaine, Farranfore, Tralee	192
Limerick	Bruff	LK	Ballylanders, Bruff, Bruree, Cappamore, Hospital, Kilmallock, Murroe, Pallasgreen	49
Limerick	Henry Street	LK	Ardnacrusha, Castleconnell, Henry Street, Mary Street, Mayorstone Park	376
Limerick	Newcastle West	LK	Abbeyfeale, Adare, Askeaton, Athea, Ballingarry, Croom, Drumcollogher, Foynes, Glin, Newcastle West, Pallaskenry, Rathkeale	78
Limerick	Roxboro Road	LK	Ballyneety, Caherconlish, Patrickswell, Roxboro Road	141
Source: www.gov.ie
