= Justin Kelly (police officer) =

Commissioner of the Garda Síochána

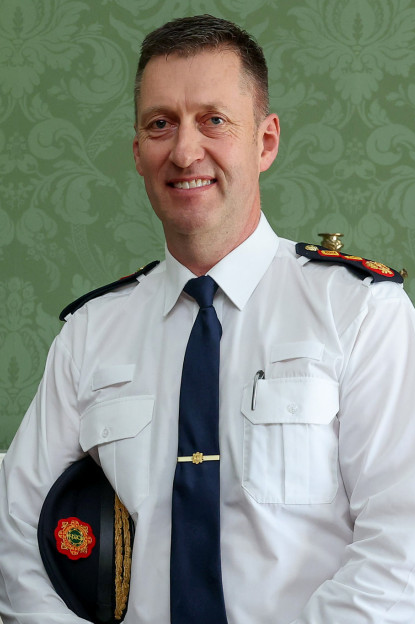
- Kelly in 2026

22nd Garda Commissioner
- Incumbent
- Assumed office 1 September 2025
- Preceded by: Drew Harris

Garda Deputy Commissioner
- In office 15 October 2024 – 1 September 2025

Personal details
- Born: 1971 or 1972 (age 54–55) Dublin
- Education: Templeogue College; University College Dublin

Justin Kelly is an Irish police officer, currently serving as the 22nd Commissioner of the Garda Síochána, the police and security service of Ireland, having previously served in that force for over 30 years, including in several senior roles. His appointment was confirmed by the government of Ireland at a cabinet meeting on 29 July 2025, and became effective on the retirement of Drew Harris on 1 September 2025. Kelly had served as Deputy Commissioner of the force since October 2024.

== Career ==
Kelly is from the Dublin 6 area. He joined An Garda Síochána as a trainee in 1992, and was assigned to Tallaght on mustering out. He worked at several locations as a Garda and Sergeant, and then served at the rank of Inspector in the stations of two of Dublin's larger suburbs, at Blanchardstown and Clondalkin. Kelly subsequently worked in the Drugs and Organised Crime unit, the Special Detective Unit and the Protective Services Bureau. In 2022, he was appointed as Assistant Commissioner for Serious and Organised Crime.

He also served in Bosnia-Herzegovina.

On 15 October 2024, he was appointed Deputy Commissioner for Security, Strategy and Governance. Kelly was one of 14 candidates for the post of Commissioner, and his initial term will be five years at a salary of over 314,000 euro. He will lead over 14,000 sworn Gardai and around 4,000 civilian support staff.

=== Qualifications ===
Kelly studied for a bachelor's degree in Civil Law (BCL) at University College Dublin and later secured three advanced degrees: while on a fellowship in 2009, a master's degree in Criminal Justice at John Jay College, New York, and later an executive MBA at Dublin City University and a first class honours master's in Serious Crime Investigation from the University of Limerick. He also studied at the UK's College of Policing and Ireland's Institute of Public Administration.

== Personal life ==
Kelly is married with 2 children.
