= Millroy =

Millroy may refer to:

- Millroy the Magician
- Ollie Millroy

== See also ==
- Milroy (disambiguation)
