= Milroy (name) =

Milroy is a given name and surname, a Scottish variant of McIlroy or an Irish variant of Mulroy.

== Given name ==
- Milroy Fernando (born 1944), Sri Lankan politician
- Milroy McCune (1883–1936), American baseball player
- Milroy Paul, Ceylonese surgeon
- Milroy Silva (born 1982), Sri Lankan cricketer

== Surname ==
- Andrea Milroy (born 1984), Venezuelan pageant titleholder
- Bill Milroy (1929–1992), Australian rules footballer
- Bobby Milroy (born 1978), Canadian badminton player
- Duncan Milroy (born 1983), Canadian ice hockey player
- Eric Milroy (1887–1916), Scotland international rugby union player
- Gary Milroy (born 1943), Canadian ice hockey player
- Gavin Milroy (1805–1886), Scottish physician and medical writer
- Helen Milroy, Australian psychiatrist
- Jack Milroy (1915–2001), Scottish comedian
- James Milroy (1933–2017), British linguist
- Jill Milroy, Australian Aboriginal academic
- John Milroy (c. 1806–1886), British civil engineer
- Lesley Milroy (born 1944), British linguist
- Lisa Milroy (born 1959), Canadian artist
- Nap Milroy (1922–2012), Canadian ice hockey player
- Nick Milroy (born 1974), American politician
- Robert H. Milroy (1816–1890), American lawyer
- Sarah Milroy (born 1957), Canadian museum director and curator
- Seán Milroy (1877–1946), Irish revolutionary and politician
- Te Wharehuia Milroy (1937–2019), Māori academic
- Thomas Hugh Milroy (1869–1950), Scottish physiologist and organic chemist
- Vivian Milroy (1917–2009), English director and producer
- William Milroy (badminton) (born 1980), Canadian badminton player
- William A. Milroy (1920–2006), Canadian Army general

== See also ==
- Milroy (disambiguation)
