= Garda Síochána =

Police and security service of Ireland

An Garda Síochána
- Shield of the Garda Síochána
- Common name: Gardaí
- Motto: Keeping People Safe (Irish: Ag Coinneáil Daoine Slán)

Agency overview
- Formed: 22 February 1922; 104 years ago
- Preceding agencies: Royal Irish Constabulary; Irish Republican Police; Dublin Metropolitan Police (in 1925)
- Employees: 18,194 (total as of 2025); 14,525 sworn members; 3,669 civilian staff; 304 reserves
- Annual budget: €2,481.1 million (2025)
- Legal personality: Police force

Jurisdictional structure
- National agency: Ireland
- Operations jurisdiction: Ireland
- Garda Síochána area of jurisdiction in dark blue
- Area: 70,273 km^{2}
- Population: 5,380,300 (2024)
- Primary governing body: Policing and Community Safety Authority
- Secondary governing body: Department of Justice, Home Affairs and Migration
- Constituting instrument: Policing, Security and Community Safety Act 2024
- General nature: Civilian police

Operational structure
- Headquarters: Garda Headquarters, Phoenix Park, Dublin
- Officers: 14,525 incl. 304 reserves (2025)
- Civilians: 3,669 (2025)
- Agency executive: Justin Kelly, Garda Commissioner
- Regions: 4: Dublin Metropolitan Region (DMR); North-Western; Eastern; Southern

Facilities
- Stations: 564
- Vehicles: 3,668 (2025)
- Boats: Garda Water Unit
- Aircraft: Garda Air Support Unit
- Canines: Garda Dog Unit
- Horses: Garda Mounted Unit

Website
- Official website

An Garda Síochána (Irish pronunciation: [ənˠ ˈɡaːɾˠd̪ˠə ˈʃiːxaːn̪ˠə]; meaning "the Guardian(s) of the Peace"), more commonly referred to as the Gardaí (pronounced [ˈɡaːɾˠd̪ˠiː]) or "the Guards", is the national police and security service of the Republic of Ireland. The service is headed by the Garda Commissioner, who is appointed by the Irish Government. Its headquarters are in Dublin's Phoenix Park.

Since the formation of the Garda Síochána in 1923, it has been a predominantly unarmed force, and more than three-quarters of the service do not routinely carry firearms. As of June 2025, the police service had 14,525 sworn members (including 302 sworn Reserve members) and 3,669 civilian staff. Operationally, the Garda Síochána is organised into four geographical regions: the East, North/West, South and Dublin Metropolitan regions, in turn broken into divisions, districts and sub-districts.

The service is the main law enforcement and security agency in the state, acting at local and national levels. Its roles include crime detection and prevention, drug enforcement, road traffic enforcement and accident investigation, diplomatic and witness protection responsibilities; it also provides a community policing service. Special units exist for specific areas of work such as organised crime prevention, migration management and cyber crime, and there is a central Garda Technical Bureau, a mounted unit, and a canine unit. The service has its own college.

Members of the Garda Síochána are not free to join general trade unions but are represented by four rank-based organisations; there is also an association for retired members of the force.

== Terminology ==
The service was originally named the Civic Guard in English, but in 1923 it became the Garda Síochána in both English and Irish. In 2025, its title was altered to An Garda Síochána. This is usually translated as "the Guardians of the Peace". Garda Síochána na hÉireann ("of Ireland", pronounced [ˈɡaːɾˠd̪ə ˈʃiːxaːn̪ˠə n̪ˠə ˈheːɾʲən̪ˠ]) appears on its logo but is seldom used elsewhere. At that time, there was a vogue for naming the new institutions of the Irish Free State after counterparts in the French Third Republic; the term "guardians of the peace" (gardiens de la paix) had been used since 1870 in French-speaking countries to designate civilian police forces as distinguished from the armed gendarmery, notably municipal police in France, communal guards in Belgium and cantonal police in Switzerland.

How it is referred to depends on the register being used. It is variously known as An Garda Síochána; the Garda Síochána; the Garda; the Gardaí (plural); and it is popularly called "the Guards". Although Garda is singular, in these terms it is used as a collective noun, like police.

An individual officer is called a garda (plural gardaí), or less formally, a "guard", and is typically addressed as such by members of the public when on duty. A police station is called a garda station. Garda is also the name of the lowest rank within the force (e.g. "Garda John Murphy", analogous to the British term "constable" or the American "officer", "deputy", "trooper", etc.). A female officer was once officially referred to as a bangharda (pronounced [ˈbˠanˠˌɣaːɾˠd̪ˠə]; "female guard"; plural banghardaí). This term was abolished in 1990, but is still used colloquially in place of the gender-neutral garda.

Colloquially, as a slang or derogatory term, they are sometimes referred to in certain areas of Ireland as "the shades".

== History ==
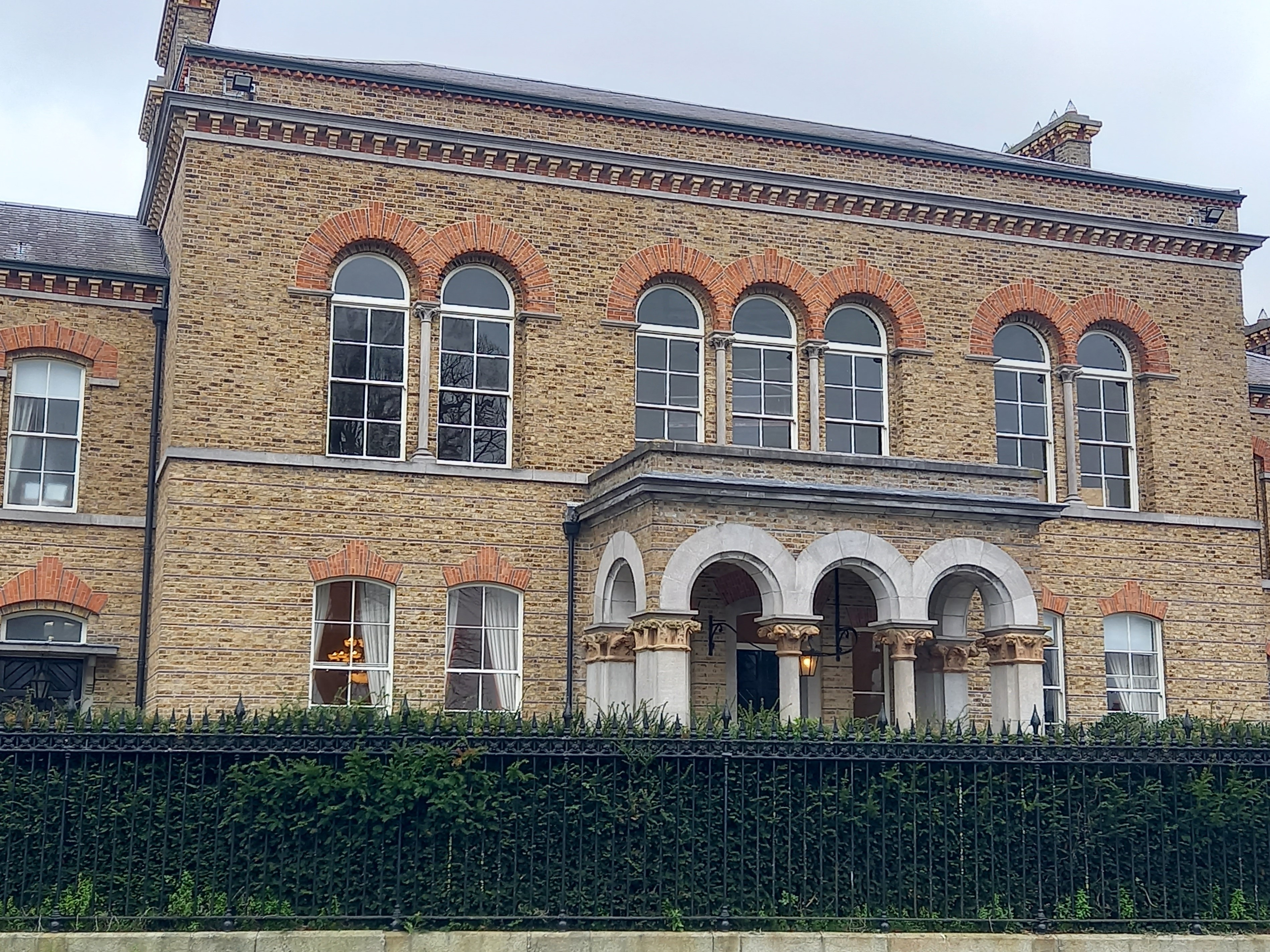
Officers' Mess, Garda Headquarters

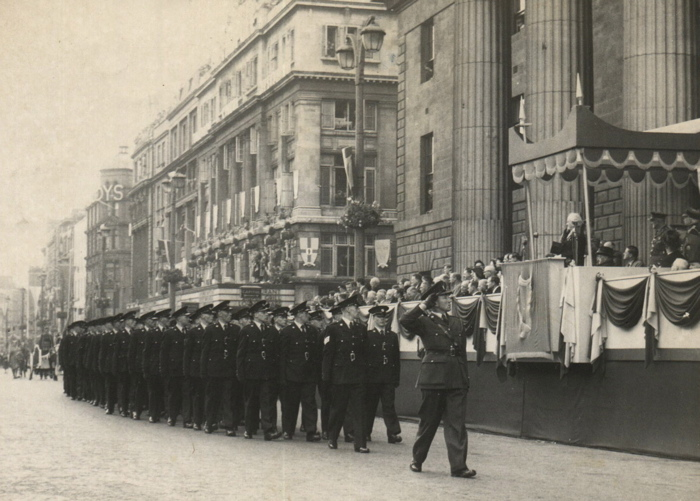
New Garda recruits salute President Seán T. O'Kelly, An Tóstal, 1954

Policing in Ireland, prior to the creation of the Irish Free State in 1922, had been undertaken by the British quasi-military Royal Irish Constabulary (RIC), with a separate and unarmed Dublin Metropolitan Police (DMP). With the outbreak of the Irish War of Independence, a security force named the Irish Republican Police was created by the provisional government. This policing organisation would slowly develop in the early years of the new state by incorporating various pre-existing law-enforcement agencies and local units into a single centralised, nationwide and civilian police organisation.

In February 1922 the Civic Guard (originally People’s Guard) was formed by the Provisional Government to take over the responsibility of policing the fledgeling Irish Free State. It replaced the RIC and the Irish Republican Police of 1919–22. In August 1922 the force accompanied Michael Collins when he met the Lord Lieutenant in Dublin Castle.

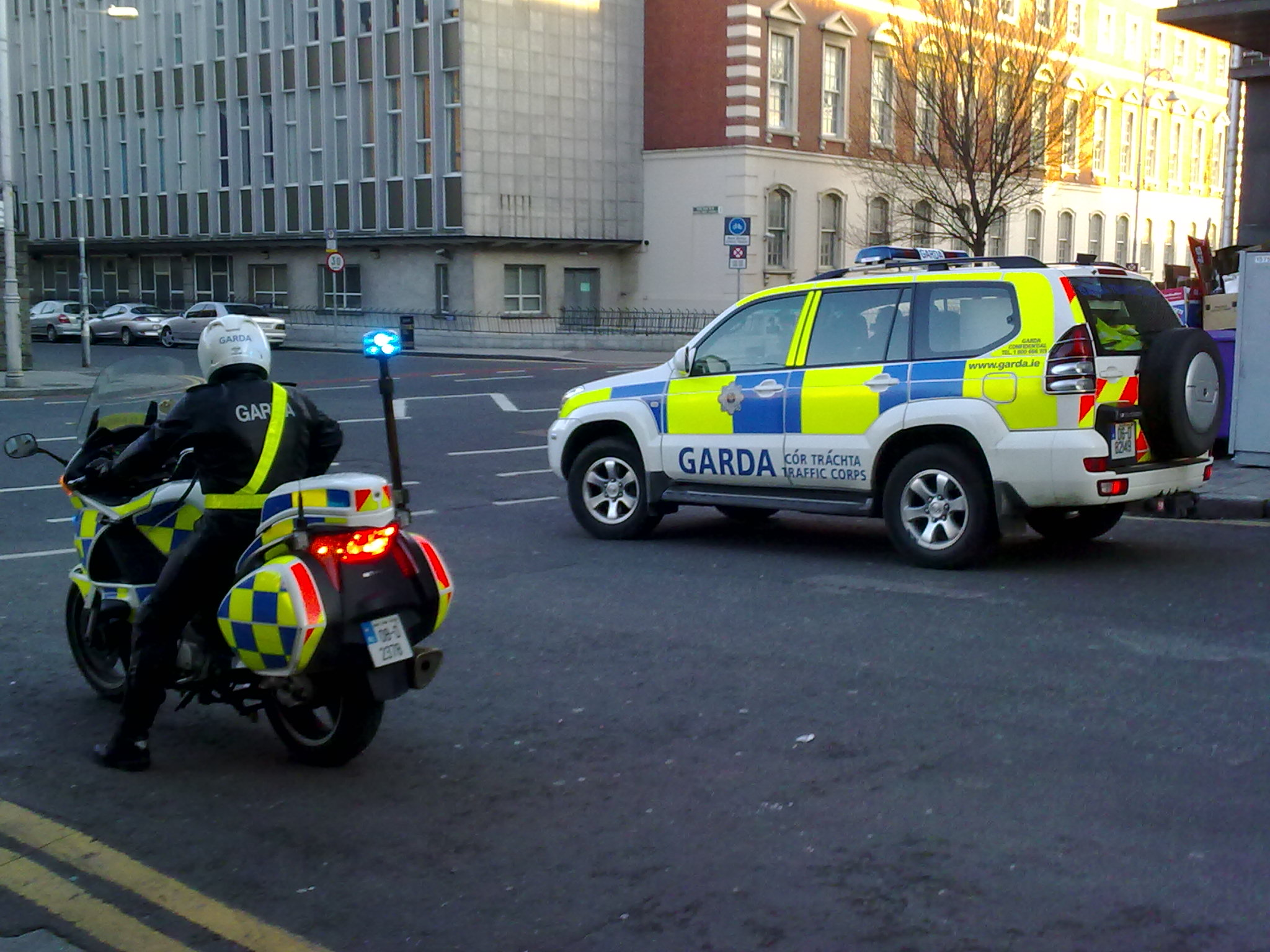
Garda Traffic Corps in Dublin

The Garda Síochána (Temporary Provisions) Act 1923 enacted after the creation of the Irish Free State on 8 August 1923, provided for the creation of "a force of police to be called and known as '[t]he Garda Síochána'". Under section 22, The Civic Guard were deemed to have been established under and to be governed by the Act. The law therefore effectively renamed the existing force.

The seven-week Civic Guard Mutiny began in May 1922, when Garda recruits took over the Kildare Depot. It resulted in Michael Staines' resignation in September.

During the Civil War of 1922–23, the new Free State set up the Criminal Investigation Department (CID) as an armed, plain-clothed counter-insurgency unit. It was disbanded after the end of the war in October 1923 and elements of it were absorbed into the DMP.

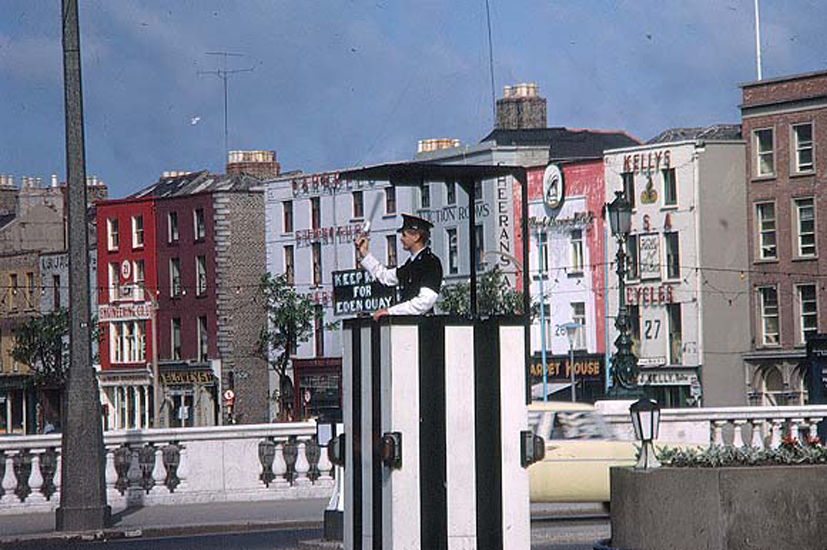
Garda directing traffic in Dublin in 1963

In Dublin, policing remained the responsibility of the DMP (founded 1836) until it merged with the Garda Síochána in 1925. Since then, the Garda has been the only civil police service in the state now known as Ireland. Other police forces with limited powers are the Military Police within the Irish Defence Forces, the Airport Police Service, and Dublin Harbour Police and Dún Laoghaire Harbour Police forces.

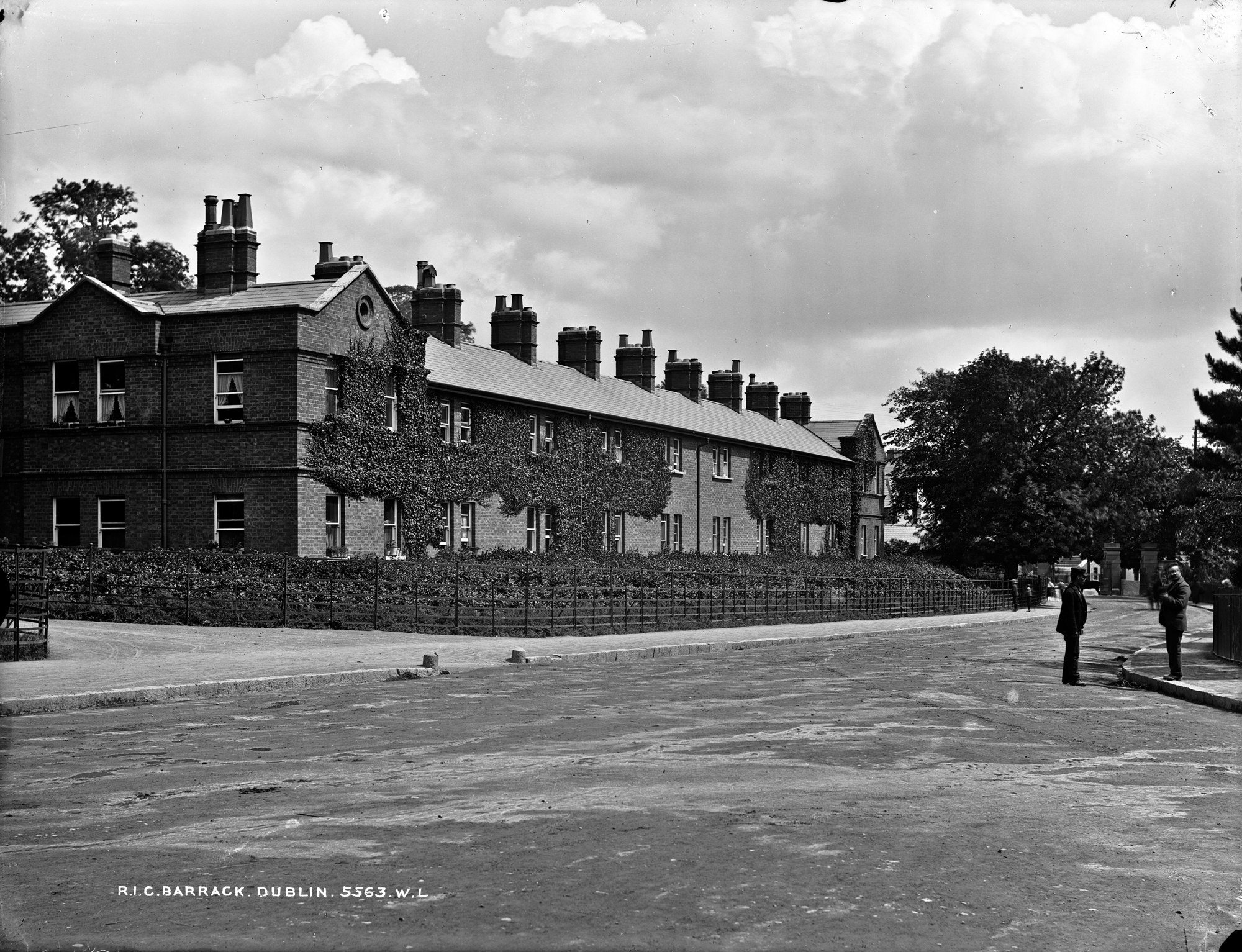
R.I.C. Barracks near the Depot headquarters, Phoenix Park, c.1865-1914

The headquarters, the Phoenix Park Depot in Dublin, consists of a series of buildings; the first of these were occupied in 1839 by the new Constabulary. Over subsequent years, additional buildings were added, including a riding school, chapel, infirmary and cavalry barracks; all are now used for other purposes. The new Garda Síochána started to occupy the Depot in early 1923. The facility also included a training centre but that was moved to McCan Barracks, Templemore, County Tipperary in the 1960s; it is now the Garda Síochána College.

During the Second World War (often referred to in Ireland as "the Emergency") there were two additional reserve forces to the Garda Síochána, An Taca Síochána and the Local Security Force.

An Taca Síochána had the power of arrest and wore a uniform, and were allowed to leave the reserve or sign-up as full members of the Garda Síochána at the end of the war before the reserve was disbanded. The reserve was established by the Emergency Powers (Temporary Special Police Force) Order 1939.

The Local Security Force (LSF) did not have the power of arrest, and part of the reserve was soon incorporated into the Irish Army Reserve under the command of the Irish Army.

== Organisation ==
The general direction and control of the service are the responsibility of the Garda Commissioner, who is appointed by the Government. The commissioner is responsible to the Minister for Justice and Equality, who in turn is accountable to the government for the security and policing of the state. The Commissioner's immediate subordinates are two deputy commissioners – in charge of "Policing and Security" and "Governance & Strategy", respectively – and a Chief Administrative Officer with responsibility for resource management (personnel, finance, Information and Communications Technology, and accommodation). A few functions, including the Office of Corporate Communications and the Internal Audit Section, report directly to the Commissioner's Office. There is an assistant commissioner for each of the four geographical regions, along with a number dealing with other national support functions. The four geographical Garda regions, each overseen by an assistant commissioner, are the Dublin Metropolitan Region, North-Western, Eastern and Southern.

At an equivalent or near-equivalent level to the assistant commissioners are such figures as the Chief Medical Officer, and the civilian executive directors, heading Information and Communications Technology, Finance and Services, Strategy and Transformation, Legal, and Human Resources and People Development.

Directly subordinate to the assistant commissioners are approximately 40 chief superintendents, about half of whom supervise what are called divisions. Each division contains a number of districts, each commanded by a superintendent assisted by a team of inspectors. Each district contains a number of sub-districts, which are usually commanded by sergeants.

Typically each subdistrict contains only one Garda station. A different number of Gardaí are based at each station depending on its importance. Most of these stations employ the basic rank of Garda, which was referred to as the rank of Guard until 1972. The most junior members of the service are students, whose duties can vary depending on their training progress. They are often assigned clerical duties as part of their extracurricular studies.

The Garda organisation also has more than 3,000 civilian support staff (not sworn police officers). working across a range of areas such as human resources, occupational health services, finance and procurement, internal audit, IT and telecommunications, accommodation and fleet management, as well as aspects of scene-of-crime support, research and analysis, training and general administration. The figure also includes industrial staff such as traffic wardens, drivers and cleaners.

=== Garda Commissioners ===
Garda Commissioners
Name	From	Until	Reason
Michael Staines	February 1922	September 1922	Resigned (Note: Due to Civic Guard Mutiny)
Eoin O'Duffy	September 1922	February 1933	Dismissed (Note: Dismissed for encouraging a military coup)
Eamon Broy	February 1933	June 1938	Retired
Michael Kinnane	June 1938	July 1952	Died
Daniel Costigan	July 1952	February 1965	Resigned (Note: Pressured to resign by the Government.)
William P Quinn	February 1965	March 1967	Retired
Patrick Joseph Carroll	March 1967	September 1968	Retired
Michael Wymes	September 1968	January 1973	Retired
Patrick Malone	January 1973	September 1975	Retired
Edmund Garvey	September 1975	January 1978	Replaced (Note: Lost government confidence)
Patrick McLaughlin	January 1978	January 1983	Retired (Note: phone tapping scandal)
Lawrence Wren	February 1983	November 1987	Retired
Eamonn Doherty	November 1987	December 1988	Retired
Eugene Crowley	December 1988	January 1991	Retired
Patrick Culligan	January 1991	July 1996	Retired
Patrick Byrne	July 1996	July 2003	Retired
Noel Conroy	July 2003	November 2007	Retired
Fachtna Murphy	November 2007	December 2010	Retired
Martin Callinan	December 2010	March 2014	Resigned (Note: Penalty points controversy)
Nóirín O'Sullivan	March 2014 (acting); November 2014 (permanent)	September 2017	Retired (Note: whistleblower scandal and breath test scandal)
Dónall Ó Cualáin	September 2017 (acting)	September 2018	Permanent appointment made
Drew Harris	September 2018	September 2025	5-year term extended to 7
Justin Kelly	September 2025	Incumbent	

The first Commissioner, Michael Staines, who was a Pro-Treaty member of Dáil Éireann, held office for only eight months. It was his successors, Eoin O'Duffy and Éamon Broy, who played a central role in the development of the service. O'Duffy was Commissioner in the early years of the service when to many people's surprise the viability of an unarmed police service was established. O'Duffy later became a short-lived political leader of the quasi-fascist Blueshirts before heading to Spain to fight alongside Francisco Franco's Nationalists in the Spanish Civil War. Broy had greatly assisted the Irish Republican Army (IRA) during the Anglo-Irish War, while serving with the DMP. Broy was depicted in the film Michael Collins as having been arrested and killed by SIS agents during the Irish War of Independence, when in reality he lived till 1972 and headed the Garda Síochána from 1933 to 1938. Broy was followed by Commissioners Michael Kinnane (1938–52) and Daniel Costigan (1952–65). The first Commissioner to rise from the rank of ordinary Garda was William P. Quinn, who was appointed in February 1965.

One later Commissioner, Edmund Garvey, was sacked by the Fianna Fáil government of Jack Lynch in 1978 after it had lost confidence in him. Garvey won "unfair dismissal" legal proceedings against the government, which was upheld in the Supreme Court. This outcome required the passing of the Garda Síochána Act 1979 to retrospectively validate the actions of Garvey's successor since he had become Commissioner. Garvey's successor, Patrick McLaughlin, was forced to resign along with his deputy in 1983 over his peripheral involvement in a political scandal.

On 25 November 2014 Nóirín O'Sullivan was appointed as Garda Commissioner, after acting as interim Commissioner since March 2014, following the unexpected retirement of Martin Callinan. It was noted that as a result most top justice posts in Ireland at the time were held by women. The first female to hold the top rank, Commissioner O'Sullivan joined the force in 1981 and was among the first members of a plainclothes unit set up to tackle drug dealing in Dublin.

On 10 September 2017 Nóirín O'Sullivan announced her retirement from the force and, by extension, Garda Commissioner. Upon her retirement, Deputy Commissioner Dónall Ó Cualáin was appointed Acting Commissioner pending a permanent replacement. In June 2018, Drew Harris was named as this replacement, and officially appointed in September 2018 following Ó Cualáin's retirement.

=== Structure ===
Rank	Irish name	Number of members at rank			
Rank	Irish name	2014	2016	2021	2023
Commissioner	Coimisinéir	1	1	1	1
Deputy Commissioner	Leas-Choimisinéir	0	2	2	2
Assistant Commissioner	Cúntóir-Choimisinéir	8	5	8	8
Chief Superintendent	Ard-Cheannfort	41	42	47	47
Superintendent	Ceannfort	140	160	165	168
Inspector	Cigire	300	247	425	468
Sergeant	Sáirsint	1,946	1,835	1,944	2,065
Garda	Garda	10,459	10,696	11,870	11,151
Total (sworn members)	Iomlán	12,895	12,988	14,462	13,910
Reserve Garda	Garda Ionaid	1,112	627	459	363

Level	Number of staff at level
Level	2023
CAO, CMO, Exec. Directors and Directors	8
Managerial (PO, AP, HEO)	326
Admin. (AO, EO)	798
Clerical officers	1,835
Total administrative	2,967
Other professional	49
Industrial and other	326
Total non-member staff	3,342

As of September 2023, the organisation is structured as follows:

- Deputy Commissioner - Policing and Security
  - Assistant Commissioner - National Crime and Security Intelligence Service
    - National Surveillance Unit
    - Special Detective Unit
    - Special Tactics & Operations Command
      - Emergency Response Unit
      - Armed Support Units
    - Liaison & Protection
  - Assistant Commissioner - Organised and Serious Crime
    - Garda National Bureau of Criminal Investigation
    - Garda National Drugs and Organised Crime Bureau
    - Garda National Economic Crime Bureau
    - Garda National Cyber Crime Bureau
    - Garda National Immigration Bureau
    - Garda National Protective Services Bureau
    - Technical Bureau
    - Operational Support Services that consists of:
      - Air Support Unit
      - Water Unit
      - Dog Unit
      - Mounted Unit
  - Assistant Commissioner - Roads Policing & Community Engagement
    - Garda National Roads Policing Bureau
    - Garda Community Engagement Bureau
    - Garda National Youth Diversion Bureau (GNYDB)
  - Assistant Commissioners for 4 regions (in turn with divisions, and a Dublin roads unit)
    - Public Order Units are embedded in the regions
    - Garda Síochána Reserve members are embedded in the regions
    - Garda Juvenile Liaison Officers (JLOs), overseen by the GNYDB, are embedded with a division (as of 2025, there were 121 JLOs nationally)
  - Executive Director for Information and Technology
    - Central Vetting Unit
    - Garda Information Services Centre
    - National Data Protection Office
- Deputy Commissioner for Strategy, Governance and Performance
- Chief Administrative Officer
  - Legal, Occupational Health & Wellbeing, HR & Professional Development and Finance & Services units
    - Garda Síochána College

=== Ranks ===
Ranks of the Garda Síochána
Rank	Commissioner	Deputy commissioner	Assistant commissioner	Chief superintendent	Superintendent	Inspector	Sergeant	Garda	Garda reserve	Student	Student reserve
Irish name	Coimisinéir	Leas; Choimisinéir	Cúntóir- Choimisinéir	Ard-Cheannfort	Ceannfort	Cigire	Sáirsint	Garda	Garda Ionaid	Mac Léinn Gharda	Mac Léinn Ionaid
Max number	1	3	12	53	191	500	2,460	12,500			
Number as of 28 February 2025	1	2	7	46	166	482	2,208	11,234	318		
Insignia	Rank insignia of Garda Commissioner	Rank insignia of Garda Deputy Commissioner	Rank insignia of Garda Assistant Commissioner	Rank Insignia of Garda Chief Superindendent	Rank insignia of Garda Superintendent	Rank insignia of Garda Inspector					

A garda allocated to detective duties, up to and including the rank of chief superintendent, is a detective and the word detective (Irish: Bleachtaire) is prefixed to their rank (e.g. detective sergeant, bleachtaire sáirsint). The detective moniker is not a rank but rather a role identification: a detective Garda and a Garda are the same rank. As of 31 December 2024, 2,488 Gardaí were on Detective duty, about one-sixth of the total.

=== Garda Reserve ===
The Garda Síochána Act 2005 provided for the establishment of a Garda Reserve to assist the force in performing its functions and supplement the work of members of the Garda Síochána. The intent of the Garda Reserve is "to be a source of local strength and knowledge". Reserve members are to carry out duties defined by the Garda Commissioner and sanctioned by the Minister for Justice, Home Affairs and Migration. With limited training of 128 hours, these duties and powers must be executed under the supervision of regular members of the Service; they are also limited concerning those of regular members.

The first batch of 36 Reserve Gardaí graduated on 15 December 2006 at the Garda College, in Templemore. Having reached a strength of over 1,100 in 2014, as of October 2016, there were 789 Garda Reserve members, with further training scheduled for 2017, however numbers have fallen since then, to under 460 as of 2021, and under 400 by 2023.

== Uniform and equipment ==
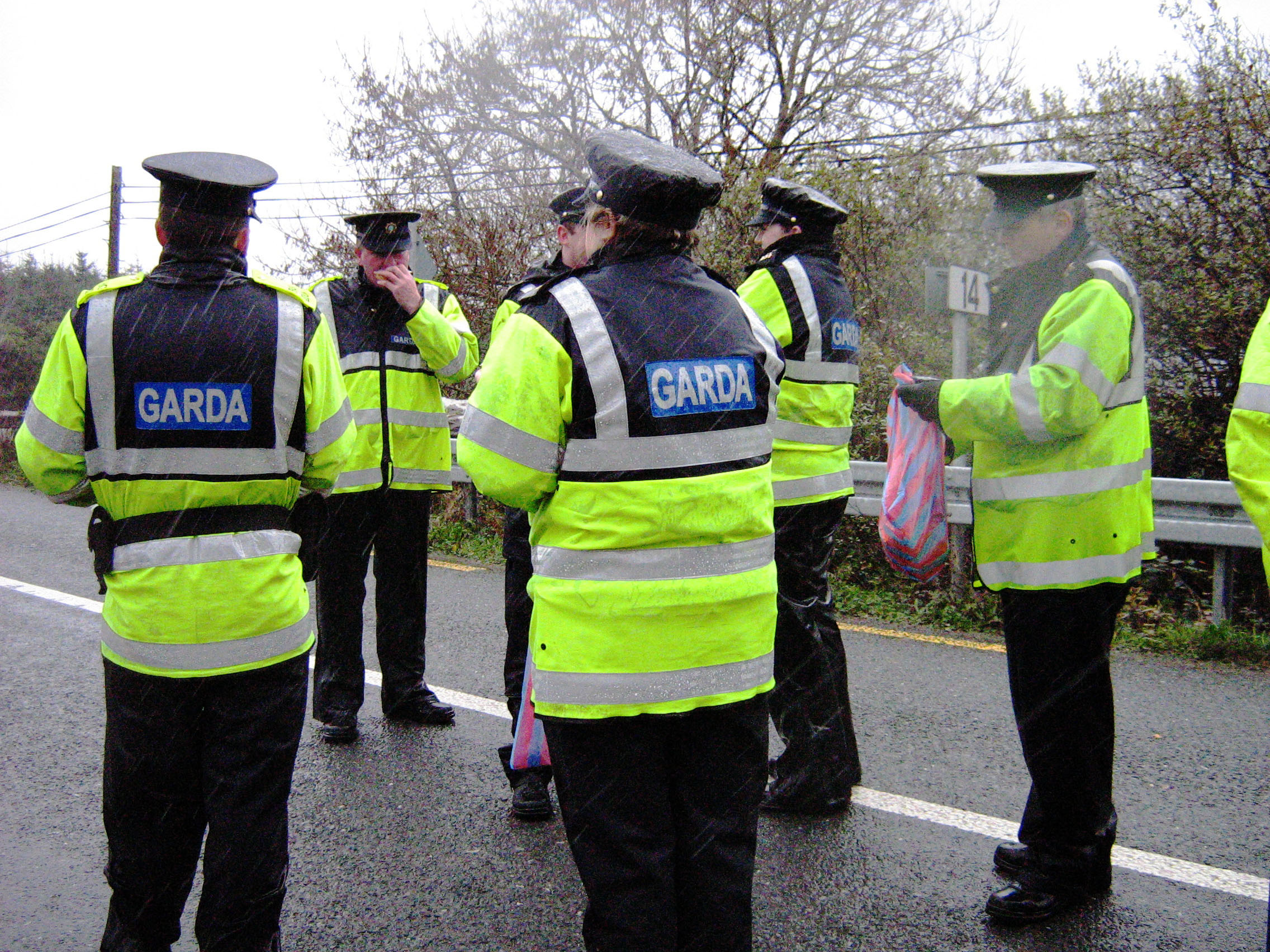
A group of Gardaí in their old uniform

=== Uniform ===
The Garda uniform originally featured a high "night helmet" and cape, as was then used in the UK. There were changes to colouration of both fabric and buttons in 1987. Further updates were made in subsequent decades.

In 2022, the fourth iteration of the Garda uniform was launched. It dispensed with formal shirts and ties, substituting a "sky blue" polo shirt, worn with loose-fitting "operational trousers", and a yellow-and-dark-navy waterproof jacket. A tie is issued for formal occasions.

From early 2025, all sergeants, inspectors and rank and file gardaí were also issued with dark-blue baseball caps, with the organisation's crest, for use while on operational duties.

Gardaí are still issued the traditional peaked cap for use on formal occasions and court appearances. Alternative head and other coverings, such as the turban, kippah and hijab, are provided for.

More senior officers, from Superintendent up to Commissioner, retain the traditional peaked cap. The "modern" (2022) uniforms are also issued only to the ranks of Garda, sergeant and inspector, with no change in uniform for those of superintendent rank or above.

=== Equipment ===
Most uniformed members of the Garda Síochána do not routinely carry firearms. Individual gardaí have been issued ASP extendable batons and pepper spray as their standard issue weapons while handcuffs are provided as restraints.

In December 2025, a taser pilot programme was introduced to four Garda stations in Dublin and Waterford/Kilkenny. The programme saw the issuing of tasers to around 128 uniformed members for use in "dire situations" when all other means of de-escalation had been exhausted. The programme expects that all uses of the tasers be recorded via bodyworn cameras and are reported to the Fiosrú, the Office of the Police Ombudsman. The programme is intended to be a preparation for a broader roll-out of taser devices for officers elsewhere in the country and the pilot programme is set to conclude during 2026.

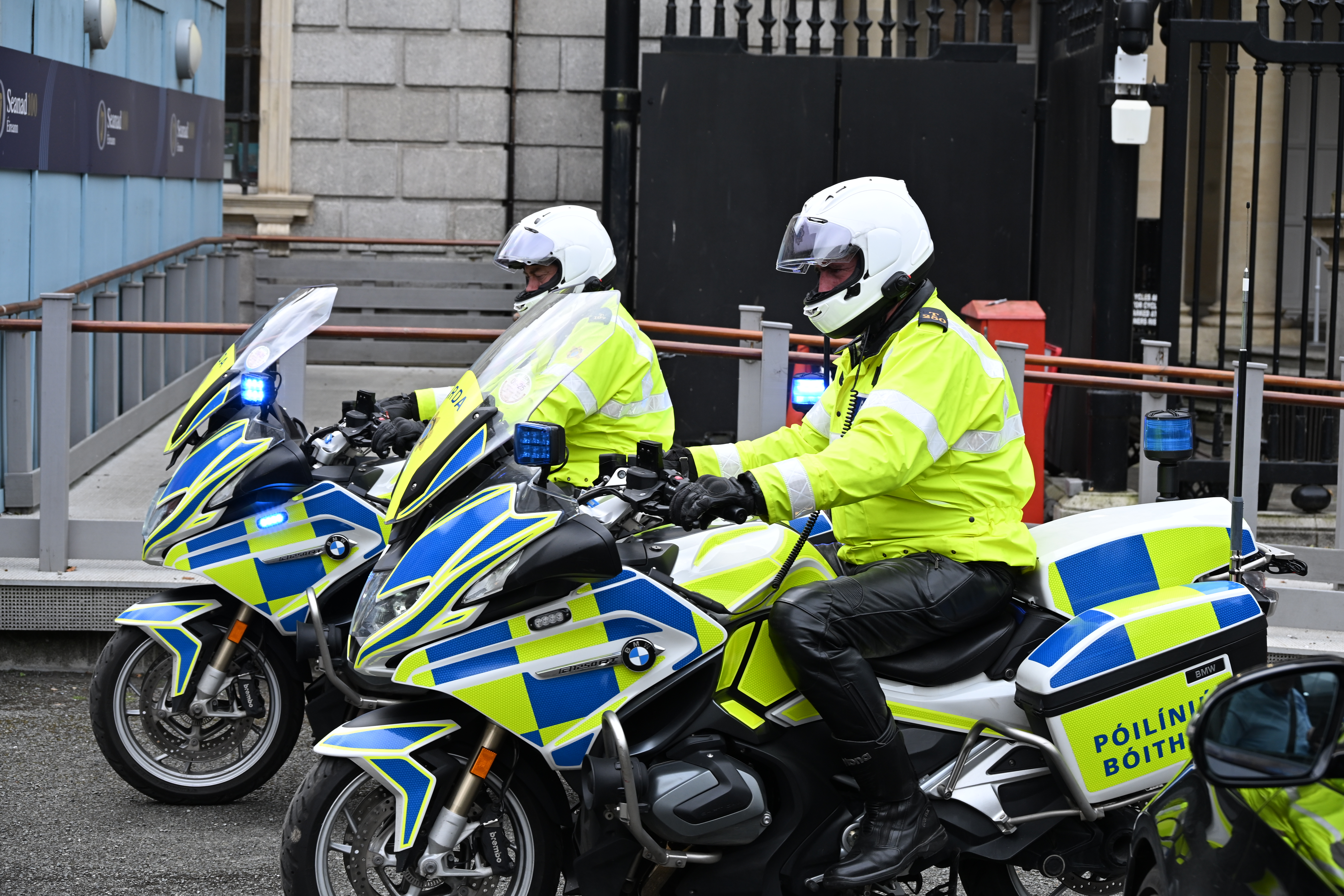
Two members of the Garda Síochána Roads Policing Unit on motorcycles

The service, when originally created, was armed, but the Provisional Government reversed the decision and reconstituted the service as an unarmed police service. This was in contrast to the attitude of the British Dublin Castle administration, which refused appeals from the Royal Irish Constabulary that the service be disarmed.

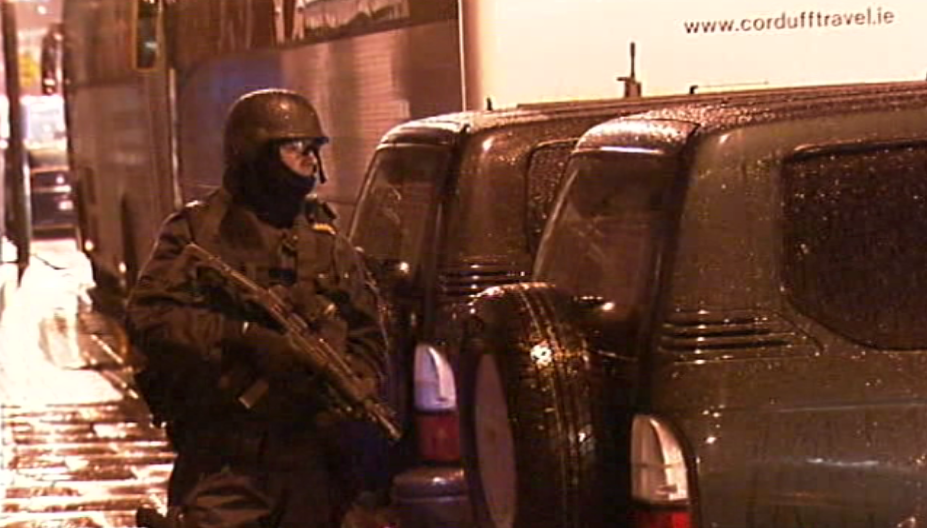
Garda Síochána Emergency Response Unit armed with an UZI submachine gun in Dublin, 2006

In the words of first Commissioner, Michael Staines, TD, "the Garda Síochána will succeed not by force of arms or numbers, but on their moral authority as servants of the people". This reflected the approach in the Dublin Metropolitan Police, which had also been unarmed, but did not extend to the CID detective branch, who were armed from the outset. According to Tom Garvin such a decision gave the new force a cultural ace: "the taboo on killing unarmed men and women who could not reasonably be seen as spies and informers".

=== Vehicles ===
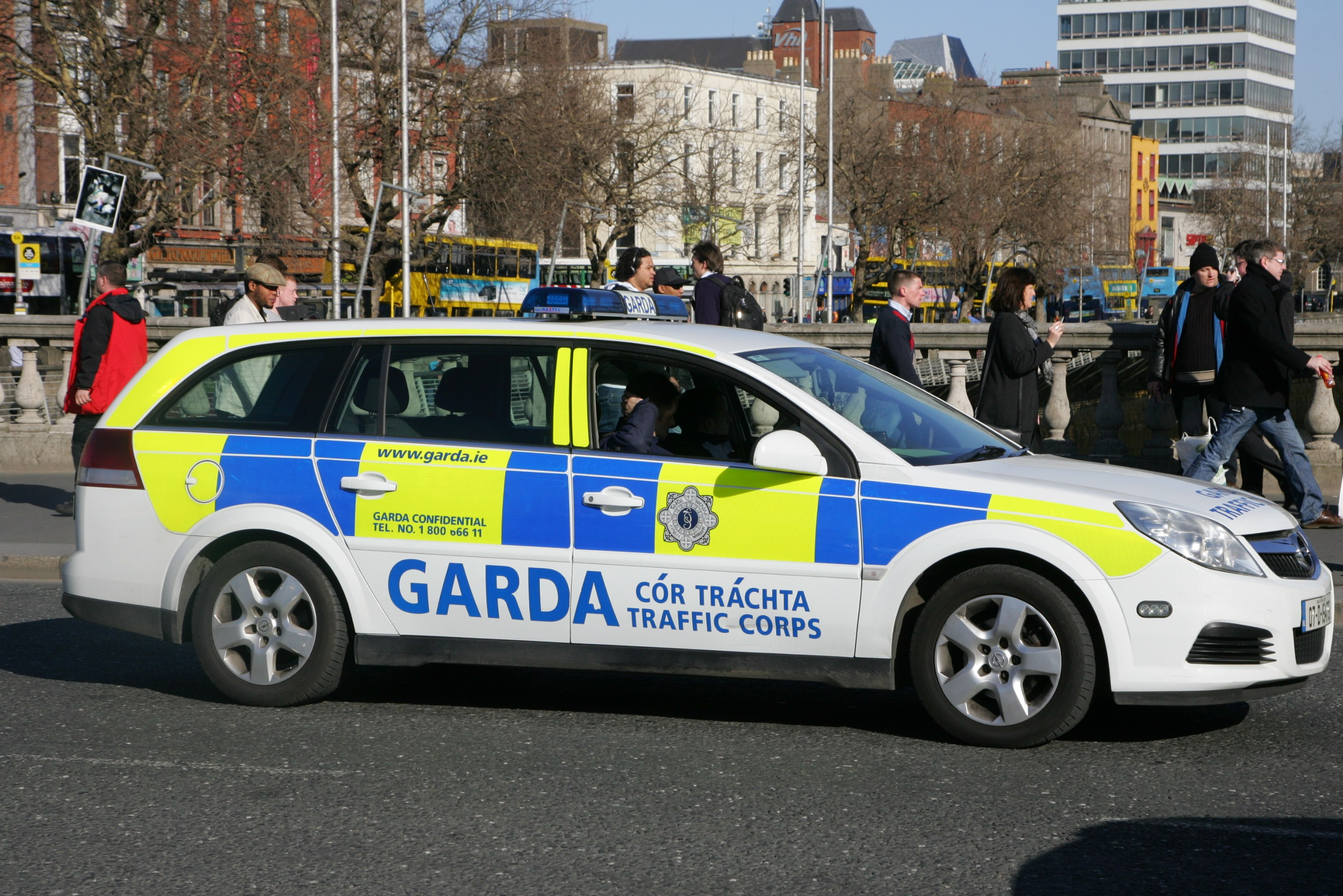
Garda Traffic Corps car

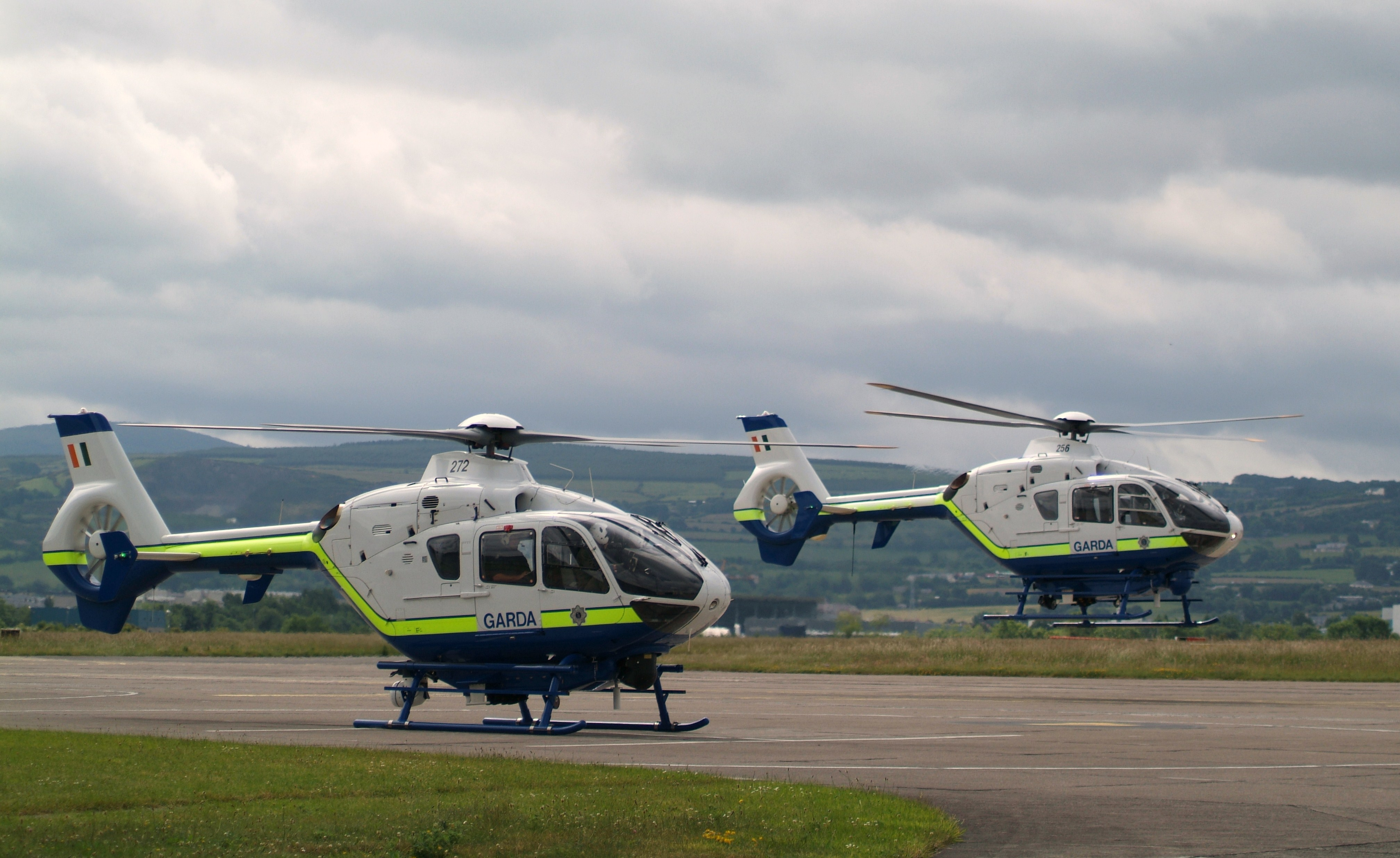
The two helicopters of the Garda Air Support Unit

Garda patrol cars are white in colour, with a fluorescent yellow and blue battenberg type marking, accompanied by the Garda crest as livery. Full or partial battenburg markings are used on traffic or roads policing vehicles. RSU/ASU vehicles also have Battenburg markings - as well as a red stripe denoting the fact that it is an armed unit. Unmarked patrol cars are also used in the course of regular, traffic and other duties. Specialist units, such as the ERU, use armoured vehicles for special operations.

The Garda Fleet management Section manages the vehicles, totalling approximately 3,600 in February 2025, which are located in the various Garda Divisions and specialist units.

== Specialist units ==
=== Armed Gardaí ===
The Garda Síochána is primarily an unarmed force; however, detectives and certain units such as the regional Armed Support Units (ASU) and the national Emergency Response Unit (ERU) are commissioned to carry firearms and do so.

A website managed by the Institute for International and Comparative Law in Africa notes that there are "no specific legal provisions on use of firearms by the Gardaí, which is predominantly an unarmed police service. Instead, the law provides an exemption from licensing requirements under the various Firearms Acts for a member of the Garda Síochána when on duty". The armed officers serve as a support to regular Gardaí. Armed units were established in response to a rise in the number of armed incidents dealt with by regular members. To be issued with a firearm, or to carry a firearm whilst on duty, a member must be in possession of a valid gun card, and cannot wear a regular uniform.

Armed Gardaí carry SIG Sauer P226 DAO and Walther P99c DAO semi-automatic pistols. In addition to issued pistols, less-lethal weapons such as tasers and large pepper spray canisters are carried also by the ERU.

In December 2018, Minister for Justice Charlie Flanagan provided updated specifics.

"Training is provided by Firearms Instructors attached to the Garda College and the Emergency Response Unit under the control of the Director of Training, Garda College. ... there are approximately 2700 personnel that are currently authorised to carry firearms. This can increase to approx. 3500 depending on operational requirements. ... Members attached to regular units and Detective units are trained in handguns only, namely Smith & Wesson revolver, Sig Sauer & Walther semi-automatic pistol. Specialist Units such as Emergency Response Unit and the Armed Support Unit are trained in Sig Pistol, H&K MP7 Sub-machine gun, Taser and 40mm direct impact munitions (Less Lethal options)".

In early April 2019, the Garda Representative Association called for 24-hour armed support units in every division across Ireland. In response, Minister Flanagan noted that "gardaí have had armed support for a long number of years. One of the great attributes of the [Garda Síochána], is the fact that it is in the main an unarmed police service. I think that's good and I would be concerned at attempts to ensure that the arming of the gardaí becomes commonplace". He did not support the GRA demands on a country-wide basis: "I think there is merit in ensuring that at a regional level, there can be an armed response should the circumstances warrant. And I'm thinking particularly in Drogheda where currently we have an armed support unit on the street in order to meet head-on what is a particularly nasty challenge".

=== Diplomatic protection ===
The Garda Special Detective Unit (SDU) are primarily responsible for providing armed close protection to senior officials in Ireland. They provide full-time armed protection and transport for the President, Taoiseach, Tánaiste, Minister for Justice, Home Affairs and Migration, Attorney General, Chief Justice, Director of Public Prosecutions, ambassadors and diplomats deemed 'at risk', as well as foreign dignitaries visiting Ireland and citizens deemed to require armed protection as designated so by the Garda Commissioner. The Commissioner is also protected by the unit. All cabinet ministers are afforded armed protection at heightened levels of risk when deemed necessary by Garda Intelligence, and their places of work and residences are monitored. Former Presidents and Taoisigh are protected if their security is under threat, otherwise they only receive protection on formal state occasions. The Emergency Response Unit (ERU), a section of the SDU, are deployed on more than 100 VIP protection duties per year.

== Governance and oversight ==
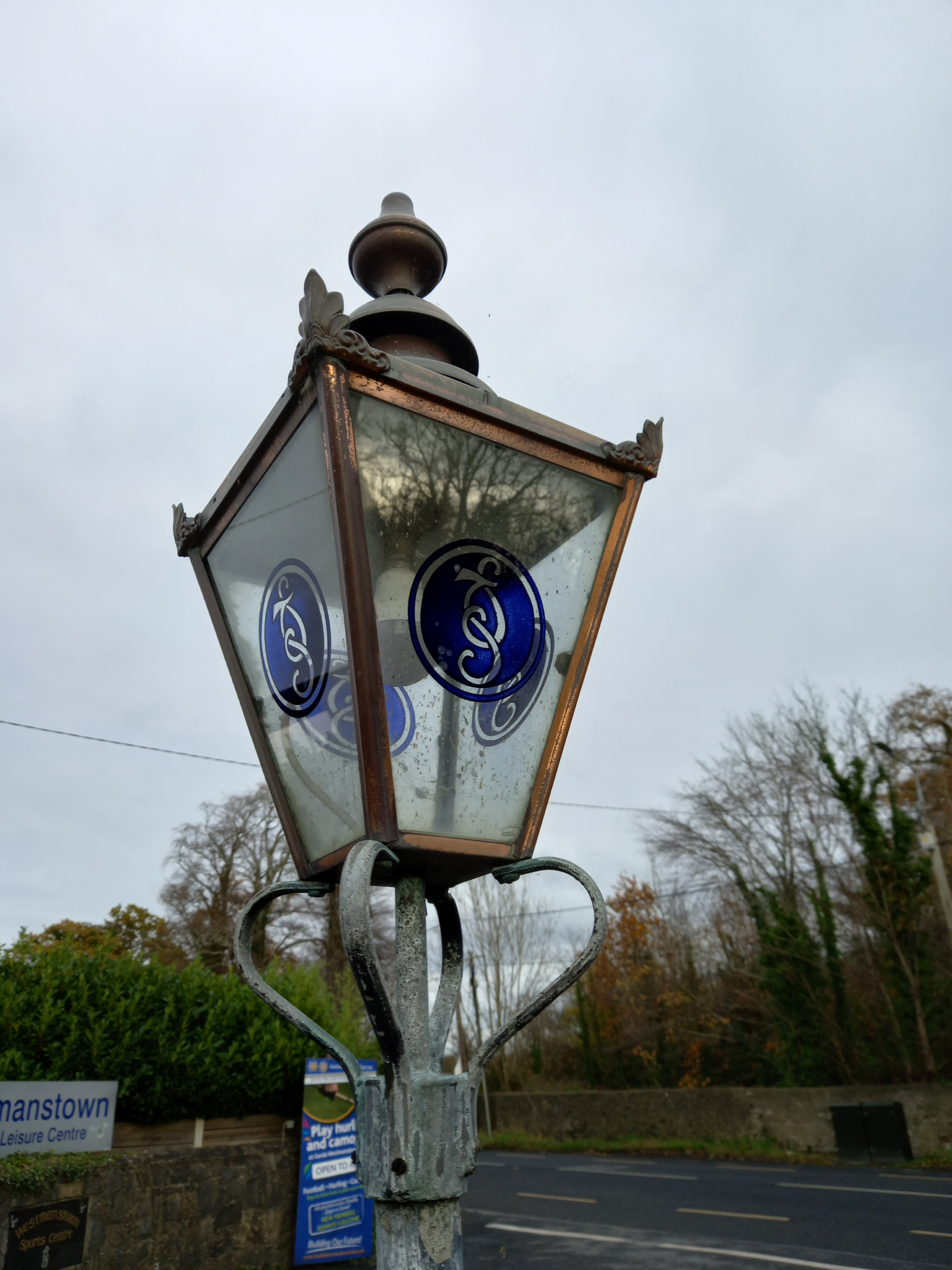
Lamp with GS monogram in Gaelic type, Westmanstown Sports and Conference Centre

The bodies overseeing the Garda Síochána were reorganised under the Policing, Security and Community Safety Act 2024, which was commenced in April 2025 by an order of Jim O'Callaghan as Minister for Justice.

The Policing and Community Safety Authority was established in April 2025 as a body to exercise oversight of the Garda Síochána. It is required to keep the Minister for Justice informed of developments in respect of matters relating to policing services and to make recommendations to assist the minister in coordinating and developing policy in that regard. It took over functions which had been performed by the Garda Síochána Inspectorate (2006–2025) and the Policing Authority (2016–2025). The Garda Síochána Inspectorate was established in May 2006 by an order of Michael McDowell as Minister for Justice, Equality and Law Reform. The Policing Authority was established in January 2016 by an order of Frances Fitzgerald as Minister for Justice, Equality and Law Reform.

Complaints from the public can be made to Fiosrú – the Office of the Police Ombudsman. This body was established in April 2025 as a successor to the Garda Síochána Ombudsman Commission (GSOC), established in May 2007. That had replaced the earlier system of complaints, the Garda Síochána Complaints Board, which had been established in April 1987.

== Scott Medal ==
First awarded in 1923, the Scott Medal for Bravery is the highest honour for bravery and valour awarded to a member of the Garda Síochána. The first medals were funded by Colonel Walter Scott, an honorary Commissioner of the New York Police Department. The first recipient of the Scott Medal was Garda James Mulroy. Other notable recipients include Garda Patrick Malone of St. Luke's in Cork City who – as an unarmed Garda – disarmed Tomás Óg Mac Curtain (the son of Tomás Mac Curtain).

To mark the United States link, the American English spelling of valor is used on the medal. The Garda Commissioner chooses the recipients of the medal, which is presented by the Minister for Justice.

In 2000, Anne McCabe – the widow of Jerry McCabe, a garda who was killed by armed Provisional IRA bank robbers – accepted the Scott Medal for Bravery that had been awarded posthumously to her husband.

The Irish Republican Police had at least one member killed by the RIC on 21 July 1920. The Civic Guard had one killed by accident 22 September 1922 and another was killed in March 1923 by Frank Teeling. Likewise 4 members of the Oriel House CID were killed or died of wounds during the Irish Civil War. The Garda Roll of Honor lists 89 Garda members killed between 1922 and 2020.

== Inter-jurisdiction co-operation ==
=== Northern Ireland ===
The Patten Report recommended that a programme of long-term personnel exchanges should be established between the Garda Síochána and the Police Service of Northern Ireland (PSNI). This recommendation was enacted in 2002 by an Inter-Governmental Agreement on Policing Cooperation, which set the basis for the exchange of officers between the two services. There are three levels of exchanges:

- Personnel exchanges, for all ranks, without policing powers and for a term up to one year
- Secondments: for ranks Sergeant to Chief Superintendent, with policing powers, for up to three years
- Lateral entry by the permanent transfer of officers for ranks above Inspector and under Assistant Commissioner

The protocols for these movements of personnel were signed by both the Chief Constable of the PSNI and the Garda Commissioner on 21 February 2005.

Garda officers also co-operate with members of the PSNI to combat cross-border crime and can conduct joint raids on both jurisdictions. They have also accompanied politicians and officials from the Republic, such as the President, on visits to Northern Ireland.

=== Other jurisdictions ===
Since 1989, the Garda Síochána has undertaken United Nations peace-keeping duties. Its first such mission was a 50 strong contingent sent to Namibia. Since then the force has acted in Angola, Cambodia, Mozambique, South Africa, and the former Yugoslavia. More recently, Garda members have served in Cyprus with UNFICYP, and in Kosovo with EULEX Kosovo. The force's first fatality whilst working abroad was Sergeant Paul M. Reid, who was fatally injured while on duty with the United Nations UNPROFOR at "Sniper's Alley" in Sarajevo on 18 May 1995.

Members of the Garda Síochána also serve in the Embassies of Ireland in London, The Hague, Madrid and Paris. Members are also seconded to Europol in The Hague, in the Netherlands and Interpol in Lyon, France. There are also many members working directly for UN and European agencies such as the War Crimes Tribunal.

Under an agreement with the British Government and the United Nations Convention on the Law of the Sea, the Garda Síochána and the Radiological Protection Institute of Ireland are allowed to inspect the Sellafield nuclear facility in Cumbria, England.

== Controversies and allegations ==
The Gardaí have faced complaints or allegations of discourtesy, harassment and perjury. A total of 1,173 complaints were made against the Gardaí in 2005, with over 2000 complaints made in 2017.

Some such incidents have attracted broad attention and resulted in a number of reform initiatives—such as those relating to Garda whistleblowers or which led to the Morris and Barr Tribunals.

=== Mishandling of cases and complaints ===
The Kerry Babies case was one of the first public inquiries into the mishandling of a Garda investigation. Later, in the 1980s, the Ferns Report (an inquiry into allegations of clerical sexual abuse) described as "wholly inadequate" the handling of one of eight formal complaints made to Wexford gardaí, but noted that the remaining formal complaints were handled in an "effective, professional and sensitive" manner.

The Gardaí were also criticised in the Murphy Report in relation to the handing over of the case of Fr. Paul McGennis to Archbishop McQuaid by Commissioner Costigan. Some very senior Gardaí were criticised for regarding priests as being outside their remit in 1960. On 26 November 2009, then Commissioner Fachtna Murphy apologised for the failure of the Garda Síochána to protect victims of child abuse, saying that inappropriate contact between gardaí and the Dublin Archdiocese had taken place at the time, and later announced an examination into the report's findings.

The Gardaí were criticised by the commission of investigation into the Dean Lyons case for their handling of the investigation into the Grangegorman killings. In his report, George Birmingham said that the Gardaí had used leading questions in their interviews with Lyons, and had failed to act on a suspicion that Lyons' confession was unreliable. For a period, the gardaí involved in the case failed to act on the knowledge that another man, Mark Nash, had confessed to the crime.

=== Allegations resulting in Tribunals of Inquiry ===
In the 1990s and early 2000s the Garda Síochána faced allegations of corrupt and dishonest policing in County Donegal. This became the subject of a Garda inquiry (the Carty inquiry) and subsequent judicial inquiry (the Morris Tribunal). The Morris Tribunal found that some gardaí based in County Donegal had invented a Provisional IRA informer, made bombs and claimed credit for locating them, and attempted to frame Raphoe publican Frank McBrearty Junior for murder – the latter case involving a €1.5m settlement with the State. A similar case saw a €4.5m judgement, after another Donegal publican was wrongly convicted based on "perjured Garda evidence" and "a conspiracy to concoct false evidence" by the same Donegal-based gardaí.

On 20 April 2000, members of the ERU shot dead 27-year-old John Carthy at the end of a 25-hour siege as he left his home in Abbeylara, County Longford with a loaded shotgun in his hands. There were allegations made of inappropriate handling of the situation and of the reliance on lethal force by the Gardaí. This led to a Garda inquiry, and subsequently, the Barr Tribunal. The official findings of the tribunal of inquiry, under Justice Robert Barr, were that the responsible sergeant had made 14 mistakes in his role as the negotiator during the siege, and failed to make real efforts to achieve resolution during the armed stand-off. It further stated however that the sergeant was limited by lack of experience and resources, and recommended a review of Garda command structures, and that the ERU be equipped with stun guns and other non-lethal options. The Barr tribunal further recommended a formal working arrangement between Gardaí and state psychologists, and improvements in Garda training.

During the mid-2010s, the Garda whistleblower scandal led to a tribunal of enquiry, and the resignations of two ministers for justice and two Garda commissioners.

=== Allegations involving abuse of powers ===
One of the first charges of serious impropriety against the force rose out of the handling of the Sallins Train Robbery in 1976. This case eventually led to accusations that a "Heavy Gang" within the force intimidated and tortured the accused. This eventually led to a Presidential pardon for one of the accused.

In 2004, an RTÉ Prime Time documentary accused elements within the Garda of abusing their powers by physically assaulting people arrested. A retired Circuit Court judge (W. A. Murphy) suggested that some members of the force had committed perjury in criminal trials before him but later stated that he was misquoted, while Minister of State Dick Roche, accused Gardaí in one instance of "torture". The Garda Commissioner accused the television programme of lacking balance. The documentary followed the publication of footage by the Independent Media Centre showing scuffles between Gardaí and Reclaim the Streets demonstrators. One Garda in the footage was later convicted of common assault, while several other Gardaí were acquitted.

In 2014, a debate arose relating to alleged abuse of process in cancelling penalty points (for traffic offences), and a subsequent controversy resulted in a number of resignations.

In 2017, Dara Quigley, who lived with mental illness, was arrested for public nudity, an incident captured on CCTV. A Garda member went to the police station CCTV control room and recorded the incident on a phone, then shared it to a WhatsApp group including other Gardaí. The video was quickly shared to Facebook and went viral. Quigley took her own life several days later. The Garda, who recorded and shared the video, was not charged with a crime.

=== Allegations involving cross-border policing and collusion with the IRA ===
The former head of intelligence of the Provisional IRA, Kieran Conway claimed that in 1974 the IRA were tipped off by "high-placed figures" within the Gardaí about a planned RUC Special Branch raid, which was intended to capture members of the IRA command. Asked if this was just a one-off example of individual Gardaí colluding with the IRA, Conway claimed: "It wasn't just in 1974 and it wasn't just concentrated in border areas like Dundalk, it was some individuals but it was more widespread."

Following a recommendation from the Cory Collusion Inquiry, the Smithwick Tribunal investigated allegations of collusion following the 1989 killing of two Royal Ulster Constabulary officers by the Provisional IRA as they returned from a meeting with the Gardaí. The tribunal's report was published in December 2013, and noted that, although there was no "smoking gun", Judge Smithwick was "satisfied there was collusion in the murders" and that "evidence points to the fact that there was someone within the Garda station assisting the IRA". The report was also critical of two earlier Garda investigations into the murders, which it described as "inadequate". Irish Justice Minister Alan Shatter apologised "without reservation" for the failings identified in the report.

The family of Eddie Fullerton, a Buncrana Sinn Féin councillor killed in 1991 by members of the Ulster Defence Association, criticised the subsequent Garda investigation, and in 2006, the Minister for Justice considered a public inquiry into the case.

=== Operational management and finances ===
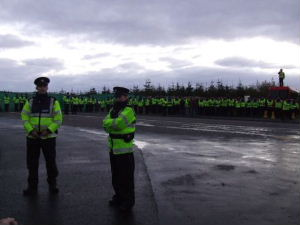
Gardaí at the site of the proposed Corrib gas refinery in Erris, County Mayo

Protests at the proposed Royal Dutch Shell Corrib gas refinery near Erris, County Mayo saw large Garda operations with up to 200 Gardaí involved. By September 2008, the cost of the operation was €10 million, and by January 2009 estimated to have cost €13.5 million. Some outlets compared this to the €20 million budgeted for operations targeting organised crime. A section of road used by the protesters was allegedly dubbed "the Golden Mile" by Gardaí because of overtime opportunities. Complaints were also made about Garda management and handling of the protests.

In 2017, a number of reported operational issues (including handling of the Garda whistleblower scandal, falsified alcohol breath tests, and the finances of the Garda Training College) were referenced as contributors to the early retirement of then commissioner Nóirín O'Sullivan.

== Reforms ==
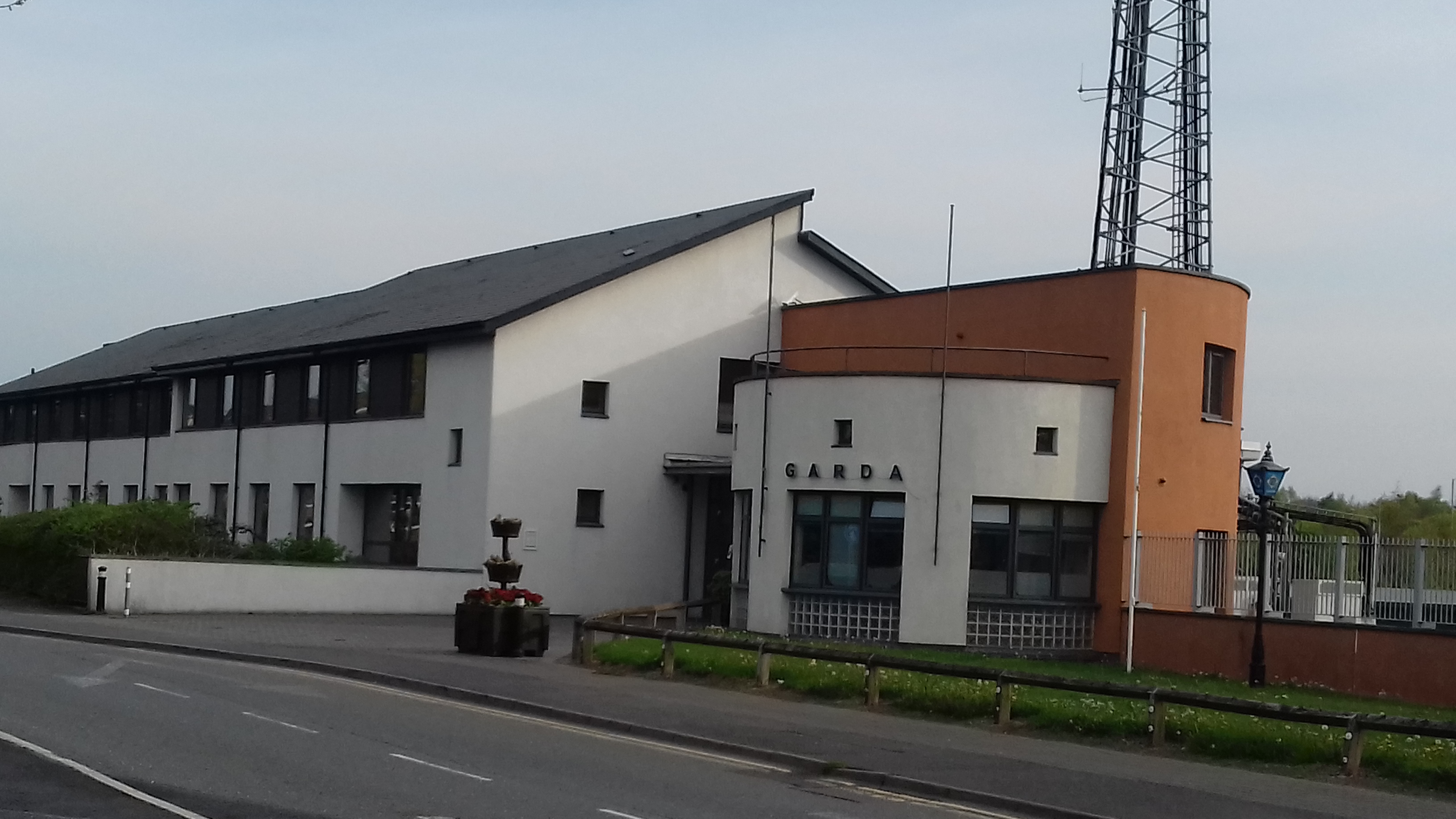
Blanchardstown Garda Station

Arising from some of the above incidents, the Garda Síochána underwent a number of reform initiatives in the early 21st century. The Morris Tribunal, in particular, recommended major changes to the organisation's management, discipline, promotion and accountability arrangements. Many of these recommendations were subsequently implemented under the Garda Síochána Act 2005.

The Tribunal has been staggered by the amount of indiscipline and insubordination it has found in the Garda force. There is a small, but disproportionately influential, core of mischief-making members who will not obey orders, who will not follow procedures, who will not tell the truth and who have no respect for their officers

— Justice Frederick Morris, Chairman and Sole Member of The Morris Tribunal,

It was also stated by the tribunal chairman, Justice Morris, that the code of discipline was extremely complex and, at times, "cynically manipulated" to promote indiscipline across the force. Judicial reviews, for example, were cited as a means for delaying disciplinary action.

The fall-out from the Morris Tribunal was considerable. While fifteen members of the force were sacked between 2001 and 2006, and a further 42 resigned in lieu of dismissal in the same period, Commissioner Conroy stated that he was constrained in the responses available to deal with members whose misbehaviour is cited in public inquiries.

=== Updated procedures and code of discipline ===
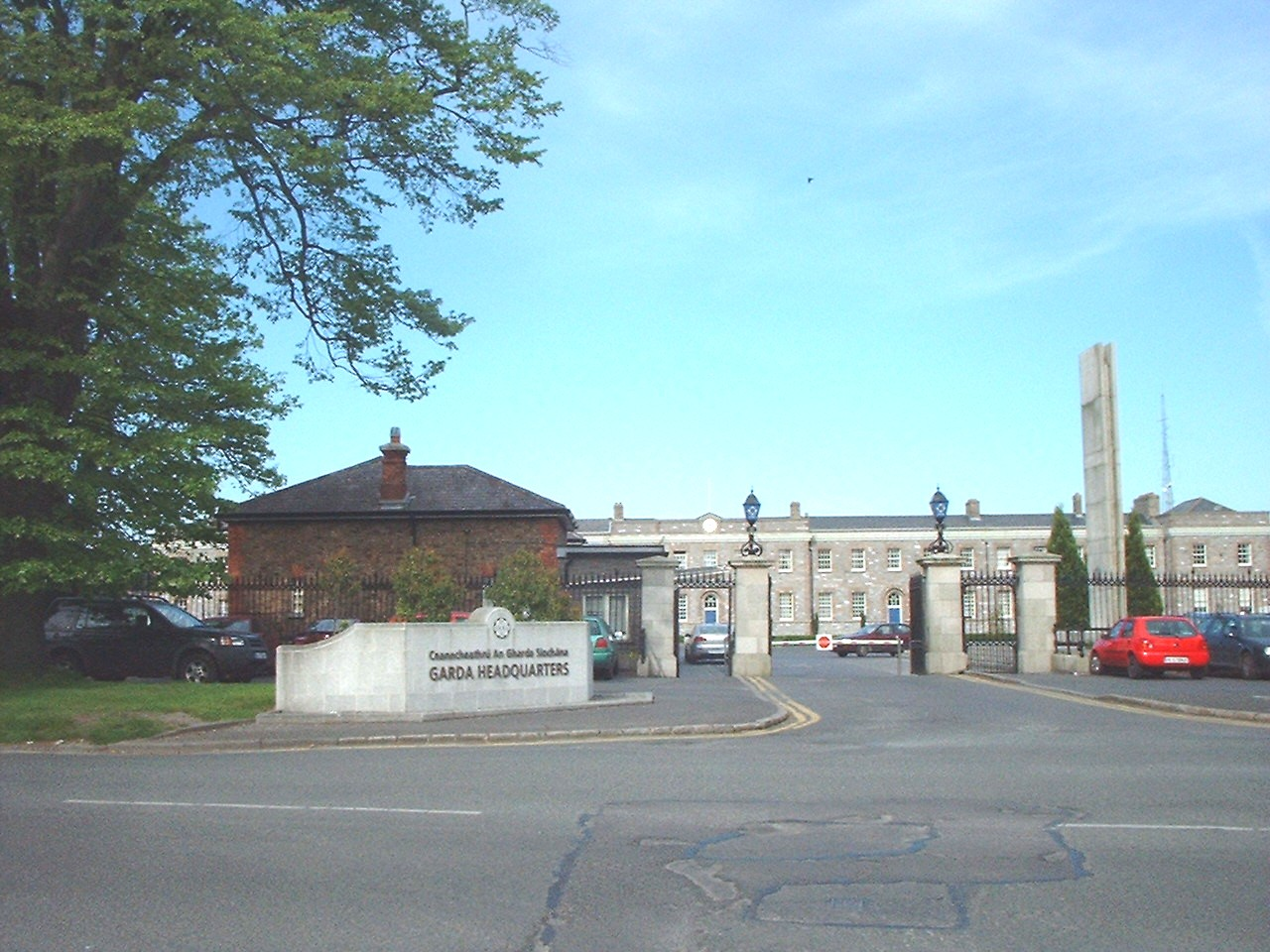
Garda Headquarters, Phoenix Park, Dublin pictured in 2005

With support from opposition parties, and reflecting broad political consensus, the Minister for Justice, Equality and Law Reform responded to many of these issues by announcing a new draft code of discipline on 17 August 2006. The new streamlined code introduced new procedures to enable the Commissioner to summarily dismiss a Garda alleged to have brought the force into disrepute, abandoned duties, compromised the security of the State or unjustifiably infringed the rights of other persons.

In addition, a four-member "non-officer management advisory team" was appointed in August 2006 to advise on implementing change options and addressing management and leadership challenges facing the Gardaí.

=== Public attitudes to the Garda Síochána ===
The Garda Public Attitudes Survey 2017 found that 74% of respondents were satisfied with the Gardaí, down from 81% in the 2008 survey.

The 2017 survey (taken before revelations of false breath tests, wrongful convictions and the departure of the commissioner) also found that less than half of respondents believed that the Gardaí was a well managed or world-class police service.

According to the Garda Public Attitudes Survey 2024, 88% of respondents indicated "trust" of An Garda Síochána, with 70% of adults stating that they were satisfied with the service provided.

=== Labour disputes ===
Industrial action (including work-to-rule and withdrawal of labour) was threatened by Gardaí during 2016, arising out of a dispute on pay and conditions.

=== Linguistic capabilities and diversity ===
In 2015, it was reported that the Garda had no active officers who are proficient in Arabic, forcing them to rely on assistance from Interpol. There were calls to recruit Arabic-speaking recruits, especially those from the Irish Muslim community.

In 2019, the European Network Against Racism Ireland submitted a paper calling for the Garda Racial, Intercultural, and Diversity Office to be disbanded and replaced with a specialist unit due to its limited manpower and resources to tackle hate crime cases.

=== Retirement age ===
The mandatory retirement age for members with the rank of garda, inspector, and sergeant was increased from 57 years old to 60 years old in 2004. Later in 2024 it was increased for all members to 62 years old, under the An Garda Síochána Retirement Regulations 2024. Since then some members have been given permission to work until they are 64 years old.

== Garda Band ==
The Garda Band is a public relations branch of the Garda Síochána, and was formed shortly after the foundation of the force. It gave its first public performance on Dún Laoghaire Pier on Easter Monday 1923, and its first Bandmaster was Superintendent D.J. Delaney. In 1938, the Dublin Metropolitan Garda Band (based at Kevin Street) and the Garda Band amalgamated and were based at Garda Headquarters in Phoenix Park.

Besides providing music for official Garda functions (such as graduation ceremonies at the Garda College) the band also performs at schools, festivals and sporting events.

Members of the band, none of whom are involved in policing duties, were paid an average of €58,985 in 2017.

== Association bodies ==
There are four legally-recognised bodies defined by regulation, each working with specific ranks of Garda:

- Garda Representative Association (GRA), for all officers of the rank of Garda
- Association of Garda Sergeants and Inspectors (AGSI), for the ranks of Sergeant, Station Sergeant and Inspector
- Association of Garda Superintendents (AGS)
- Association of Garda Chief Superintendents (AGCS)

There is also the Garda Retired Members Association (GRMA), previously the Garda Pensioners Association.

Members of the Garda Síochána have their own credit unions and a medical insurance society, as well as a benevolent society for members and former members in need. The organisation has a wide range of clubs and societies, with a coordinating structure, the Coiste Siamsa, for sporting groups.

== See also ==
- Garda Museum
- List of Garda districts
- Criminal Assets Bureau – Irish law enforcement agency
