= Garda National Protective Services Bureau =

Specialist unit of the Irish police

The Garda National Protective Services Bureau (GNPSB) is a specialist unit of the Garda Síochána in Ireland that handles human trafficking, child protection, domestic violence and sexual violence and general support to victims in distress. Established in 2015, GNSPB is commanded by a Detective Chief Superintendent.

The bureau houses the following units:

- Domestic Abuse Intervention Unit
- Domestic Homicide Review Team
- Sex Offender Management & Intelligence Unit
- Sex Offender Risk & Assessment Management Unit
- Violent Crime Linkage Analyses System Unit
- Missing Persons Unit
- Sex Offender Liaison
- GNPSB Intelligence Office
- National Victims Liaison Office
- Victims of Crime Related Matters
- Human Trafficking Investigation & Co-Ordination Unit
- Sexual Crime Management Unit
- On-Line Child Exploitation Unit
- Child Protection
