= James Mulroy =

Irish police officer

- Born: James Mulroy; 17 August 1899; Coolkevane, Straide, County Mayo, Ireland
- Died: 7 August 1986 (aged 86)
- Known for: First recipient of the Scott Medal
- Police career
- Force: Garda Síochána
- Allegiance: Ireland
- Branch: Special Branch (later career)
- Service years: 1922–1962
- Status: Retired
- Rank: Garda (1264)
- Awards: Scott Medal (Gold)
- Memorials: His medal is in the Garda Museum
- Other work: Labourer (prior to joining Garda Síochána)

James Mulroy (17 August 1899 – 7 August 1986), was an Irish police officer (Garda 1264) who was the first recipient of the Scott Medal.

== Background ==
Mulroy was born at Coolkevane, Straide, County Mayo. Prior to joining the Garda Síochána on 19 May 1922, he had been a labourer.

== Incident near Broadford ==
Mulroy's first posting was to Broadford, County Clare. On 23 May 1923, he and a colleague, some four miles from the station, were waylaid by two armed robbers. The Gardaí were told to surrender all possessions, including their uniforms. Mulroy refused. He was taken to a deserted laneway to be murdered; en route he refused to move another step, challenging the robbers to shoot him where he stood. One of the robbers placed a revolver against his chest and gave him five minutes to change his mind. During that course of time the robber became distracted, and Mulroy was able to overpower him. The other robber shot him in the shoulder but, as it had been a single-barrel shotgun, was unable to fire again, so he began to beat him around the head with the butt of the gun until the stock broke.

== Recognition ==
Garda Mulroy was awarded the Scott Gold Medal by Colonel Scott himself at the Depot, Phoenix Park, on 18 August 1924. In his later career he served in with the Special Branch, Limerick. He retired on 16 August 1962. His achievement was recognised in 1978 at a special dinner during which he presented his medal to the Garda Museum.
