= Garda Water Unit =

Unit of the police service of Ireland

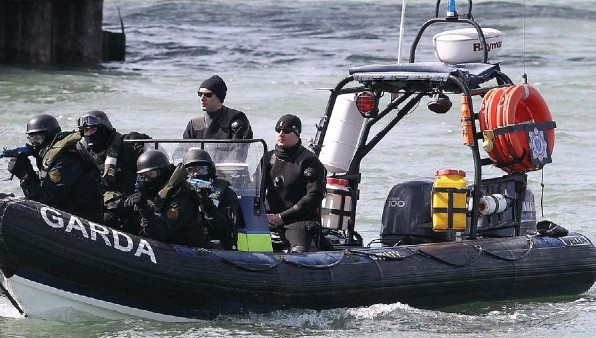
Garda Water Support Unit conducting counter-terrorism maritime operations with the ERU on the River Liffey, Dublin

The Garda Water Support Unit (Irish: Aonad Uisce an Gharda Síochána) is a unit of the Garda Síochána, the police service of Ireland. Formerly known as the Garda Sub-Aqua Unit, the name was changed to incorporate the services of the non-diving surfaced based marine section.

It is part of the Operational Support Units which provides specialist support to Gardaí nationwide. The Operational Support Units also includes the Dog Support, Mounted Support and Air Support.

== Operations ==
The Water Unit exists to assist the Garda Síochána in both diving and surface operations. Diving operations include searching for and recovery of missing persons and evidence, conducting security searches in water and in confined spaces e.g. sewers. The unit also conduct surface patrols which encompass maritime safety, maritime legislation enforcement and security patrols.

The approximate strength of the unit is three sergeants and fourteen officers, who cover the entire jurisdiction of the Republic of Ireland. The unit operate out of Santry Garda Station, Dublin, and Athlone Garda Station, Westmeath.

== Training ==
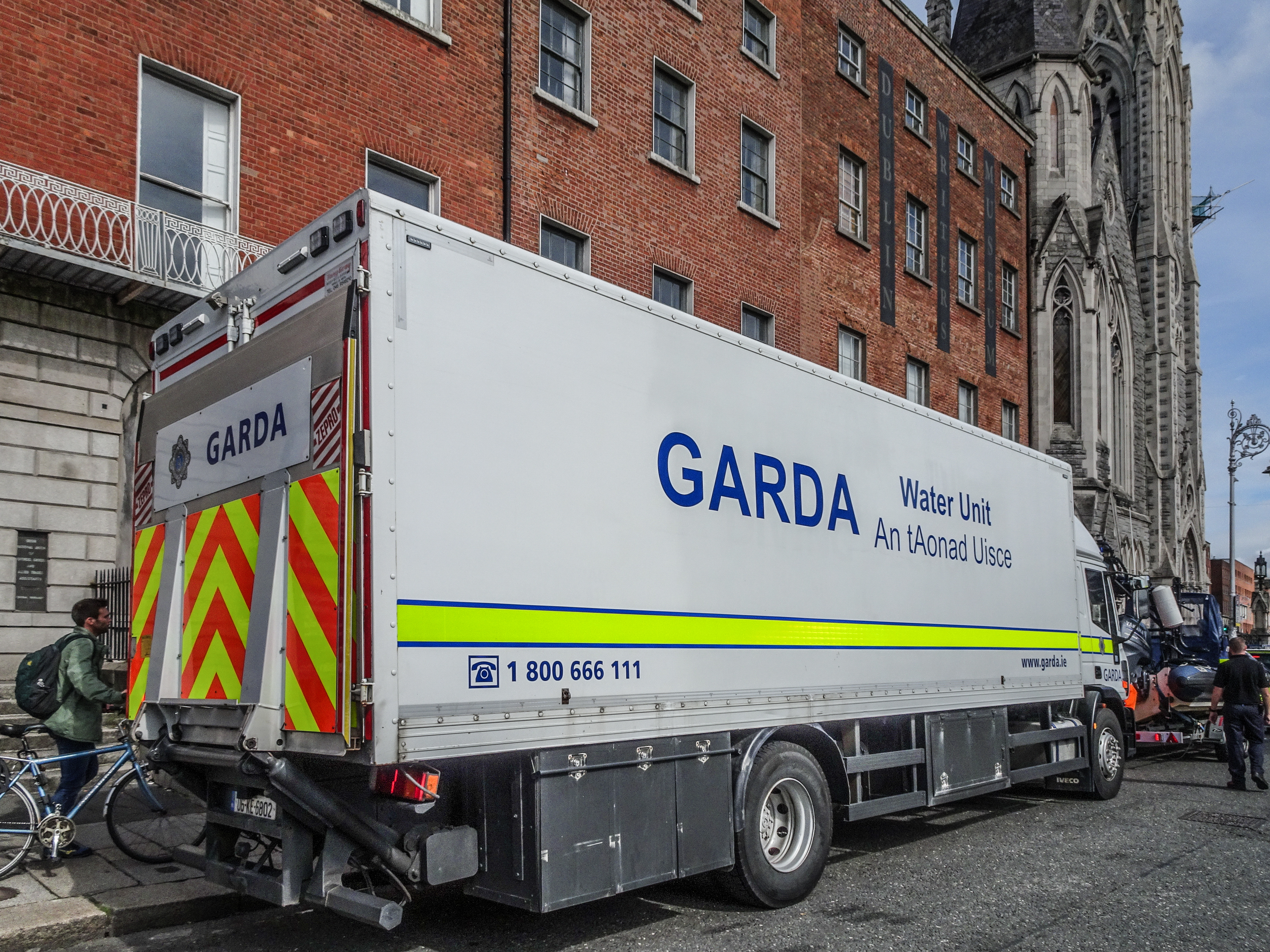
Garda Water Unit lorry

The environments where the Garda Water Unit members carry out their duties are potentially life-threatening. Training of team members is thorough and on-going. Members must successfully complete courses in the following areas:

- Breathing Apparatus and Escape sets (Confined Space Searches)
- ISA Advanced Powerboat Coxswain
- Firearms familiarisation & safe handling
- Evidence handling & recovery
- Garda Driving courses

Members can further specialise in: dive supervision, underwater photography, climbing & rope skills, equipment servicing, and Sonar operating.

== Equipment ==
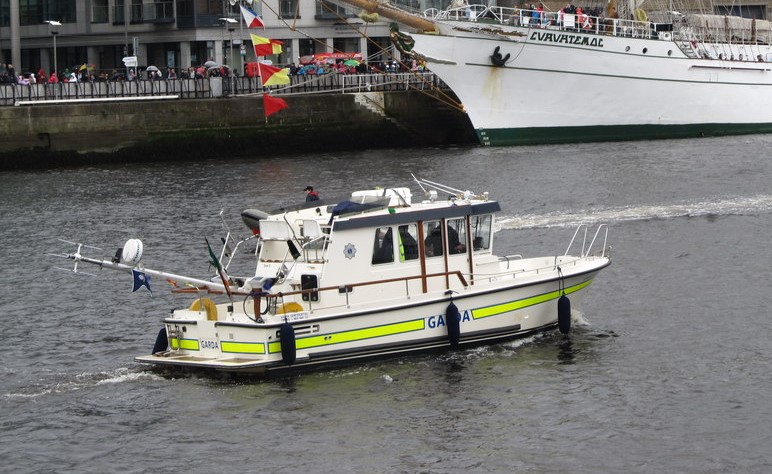
Garda Patrol Boat Colm na Cora on the Liffey

The Garda Water Unit employ a mixture of fifteen different types of water-borne vessels, mostly inflatable boats. Two however are river-going vessels used for inland patrols.

Quantity	Type	Commissioned
1	Arvor 250 Inland Patrol Boat	2007
1	Targa 31 Colm na Cora Inland Patrol Boat	2000
1	Osprey Rigid Inflatable Boat	1996
3	Delta Inflatable Boat	2007
1	Zodiac Inflatable Boat	1999
3	Zodiac Inflatable Boat	2013
5	Other inflatable boats	2009–2011

== Inter-agency operations ==
The Garda Water Unit cross-trains with the other Garda Operational Support Units. It also carries out operations and exercises with a number of agencies such as the Irish Coast Guard, the Irish Customs Service, the Irish Naval Service (NSDS) and the Civil Defence.
