= Garda Mounted Unit =

Horseback unit of An Garda Síochána

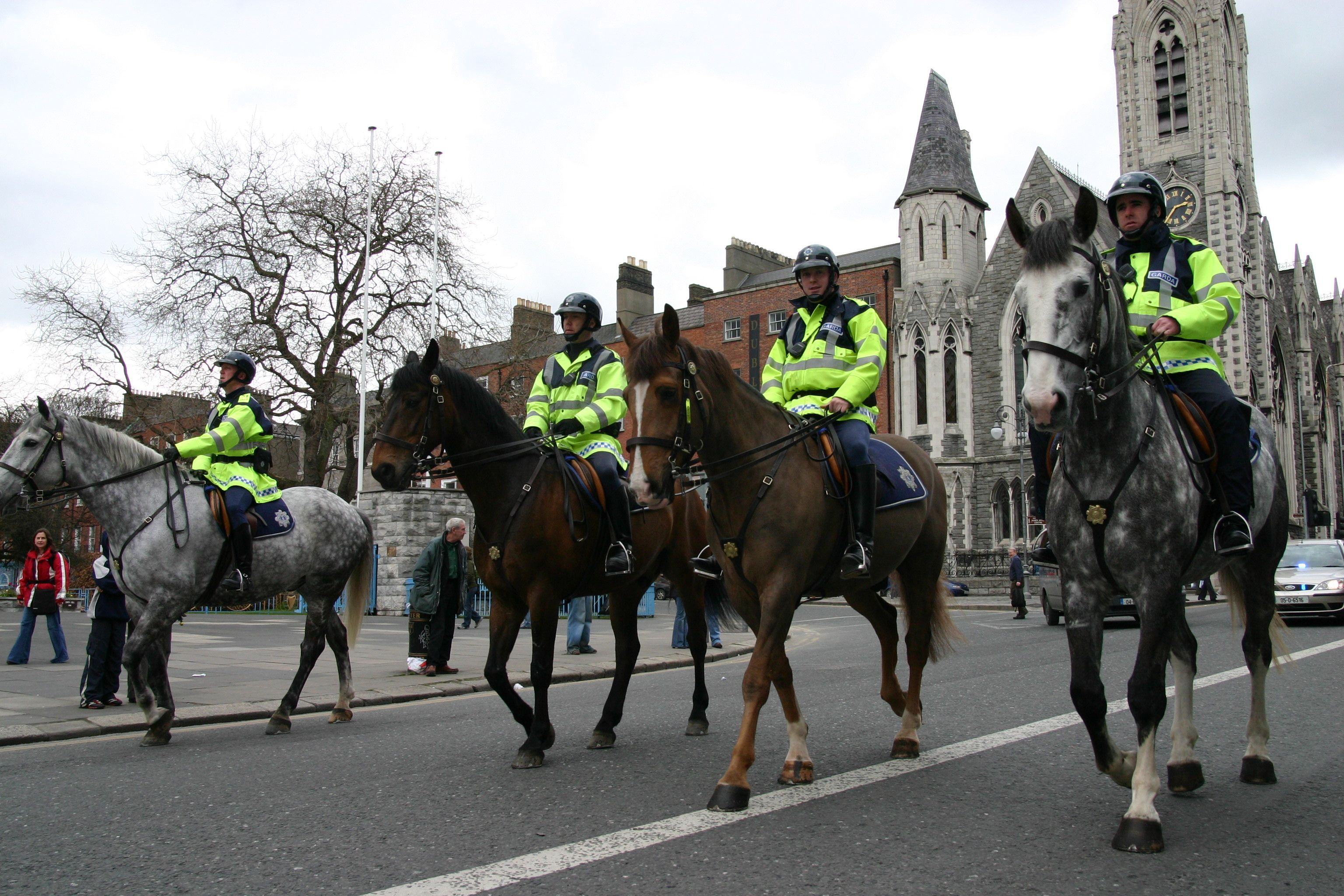
Gardaí on horseback at a dissident republican rally, 2006

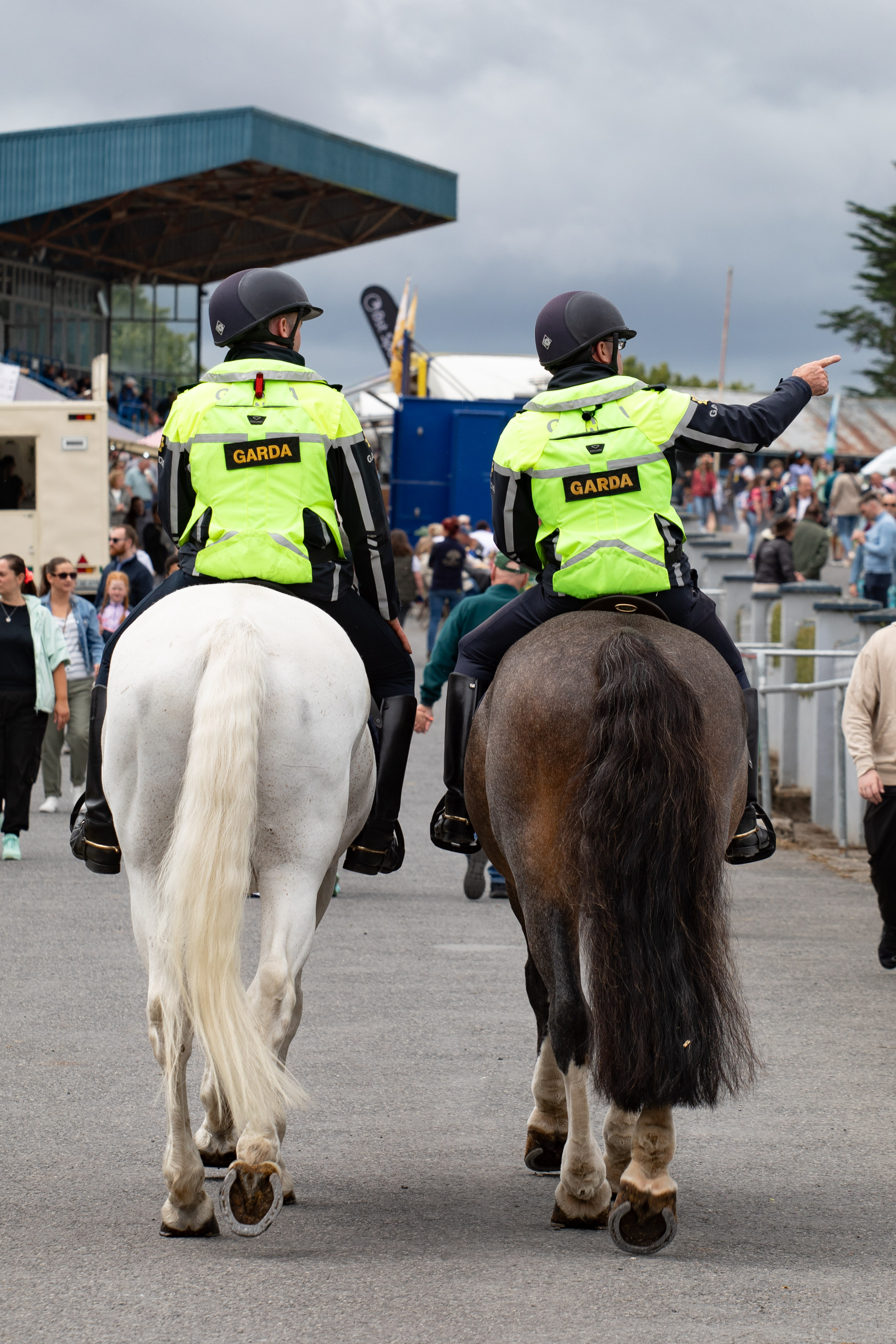
Mounted Gardaí at the Clonmel Show, 2025

The Garda Mounted Support Unit (Irish: Marcaonad an Gharda Síochaná) is the horseback mounted division of the Garda Síochána.

It is part of the Operational Support Unit which provides specialist support to Gardaí nationwide. The Operational Support Unit also includes the Water Support, Dog Support and Air Support units.

== History and formation ==
Historical predecessors to the Garda Mounted unit include the Dublin Horse Police, Dublin Metropolitan Police, and the Royal Irish Constabulary. The Garda Mounted Unit was formed in 1998 when the North Yorkshire Police disbanded its mounted unit allowing the Gardaí to acquire its horses and equipment. It became operational on 17 May that year.

== Operation ==
The unit has its base in the Phoenix Park with stables at Áras an Uachtaráin and not at the Garda Headquarters. The unit has a strength of Two Sergeants and Sixteen Gardaí with fourteen horses, with plans for expansion to fifteen horses. The Irish Draught Horse is the preferred breed for the Mounted Unit.

== Functions ==
The Unit's general duties are high visibility crime prevention and include:

- Community policing
- Event policing
- Support to mainstream Garda operations
- Crowd control & public order
- Searches for missing persons in inaccessible areas

== Operations ==
The Garda Mounted Unit typically attends large public gatherings such as sporting occasions (including the 2009 All-Ireland Hurling Final) and concerts, as well as the Ballinasloe Horse Fair, the Dublin Horse Show at the RDS and the National Ploughing Championships. It also attends the Dublin St Patrick's Day parade and other State Occasions on a ceremonial basis.
