= Milroy, New South Wales =

Milroy New South Wales
- Coordinates: 32°35′21″S 149°37′09″E
- Population: 51 (2016 census)
- Postcode(s): 2850
- Location: 266 km (165 mi) NW of Sydney; 168 km (104 mi) NE of Orange, New South Wales; 3.9 km (2 mi) E of Mudgee
- LGA(s): Mid-Western Regional Council
- State electorate(s): Electoral district of Dubbo
- Federal division(s): Calare

Milroy is a locality in New South Wales, Australia. It is located about 3.9 kilometres (2.4 mi) east of Mudgee. In the 2016 census, it recorded a population of 51 people.
