= Garda Dog Unit =

Unit of the Garda Síochána

Garda Dog Support Unit
- Country: Ireland
- Agency: Garda Síochána
- Type: Police Dog Unit
- Role: Law enforcement

Website
- https://www.garda.ie/en/

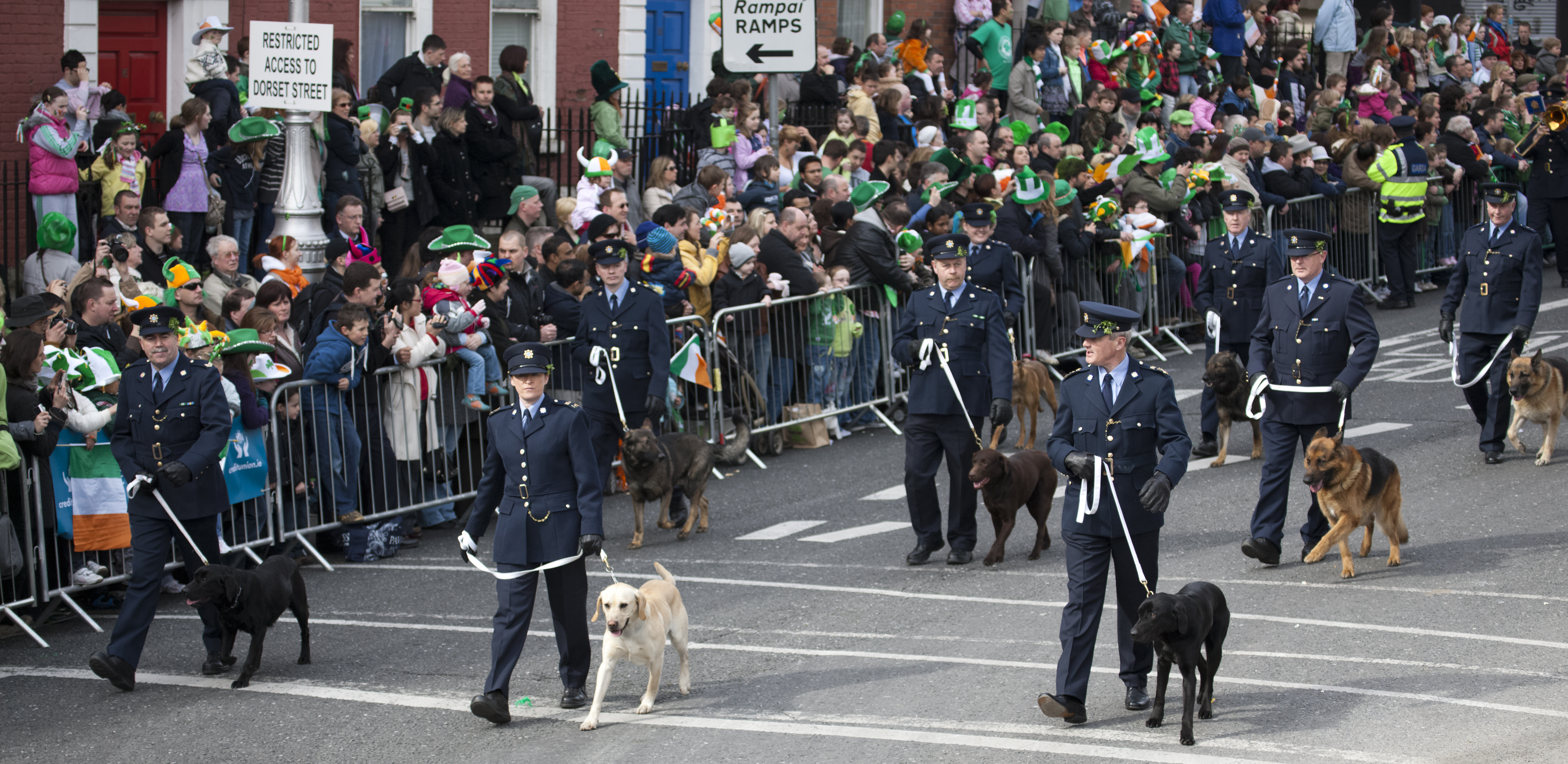
Garda dogs and their handlers march in the Dublin St. Patrick's day parade, 2010

The Garda Dog Support Unit (Irish: Aonad Gadhar an Gharda Síochána) is a unit of the Garda Síochána, the police force of Ireland.

It is part of the Operational Support Unit which provides specialist support to Gardaí nationwide. The Operational Support Unit also includes the Water Support Unit, Mounted Support Unit and Air Support Unit.

Formed in 1960, the main duties of the dog unit involve assisting in public order situations and searches.

Potential Garda dogs are assessed for about 3–4 weeks and if suitable they start the training programme. It can take at least 8 weeks to train a dog to search for drugs and explosives, and up to 14 weeks to train for patrols and to search for missing persons. After the training is completed, the dog and its handler start operational duty immediately, although ongoing training is continued on a very regular basis. The dogs live in their handler's home, so they build a relationship with their handler, although the dogs understand the difference between work and off duty.

On 18 October 2023, one of the dogs, named Laser, hit national headlines when it was retiring after serving more than decade in the unit.

There are 19 dogs in the unit, which is based at Kilmainham Garda Station, but there are also dog handlers in Cork and Limerick. In July 2023, a new Garda Dog Unit was approved for Sligo and Leitrim division.
