= Garda Air Support Unit =

Irish police unit

- GASU emblem
- Abbreviation: GASU

Agency overview
- Formed: September 1997

Jurisdictional structure
- National agency (Operations jurisdiction): Ireland
- Operations jurisdiction: Ireland
- Legal jurisdiction: Eastern, Northern, Southern, South-Eastern, Western and Dublin regions
- Governing body: Department of Justice, Home Affairs and Migration
- General nature: Civilian police

Operational structure
- Headquarters: Casement Aerodrome
- Parent agency: Garda Síochána

Facilities
- Aircraft: Eurocopter EC135; Viking 400 Twin Otter

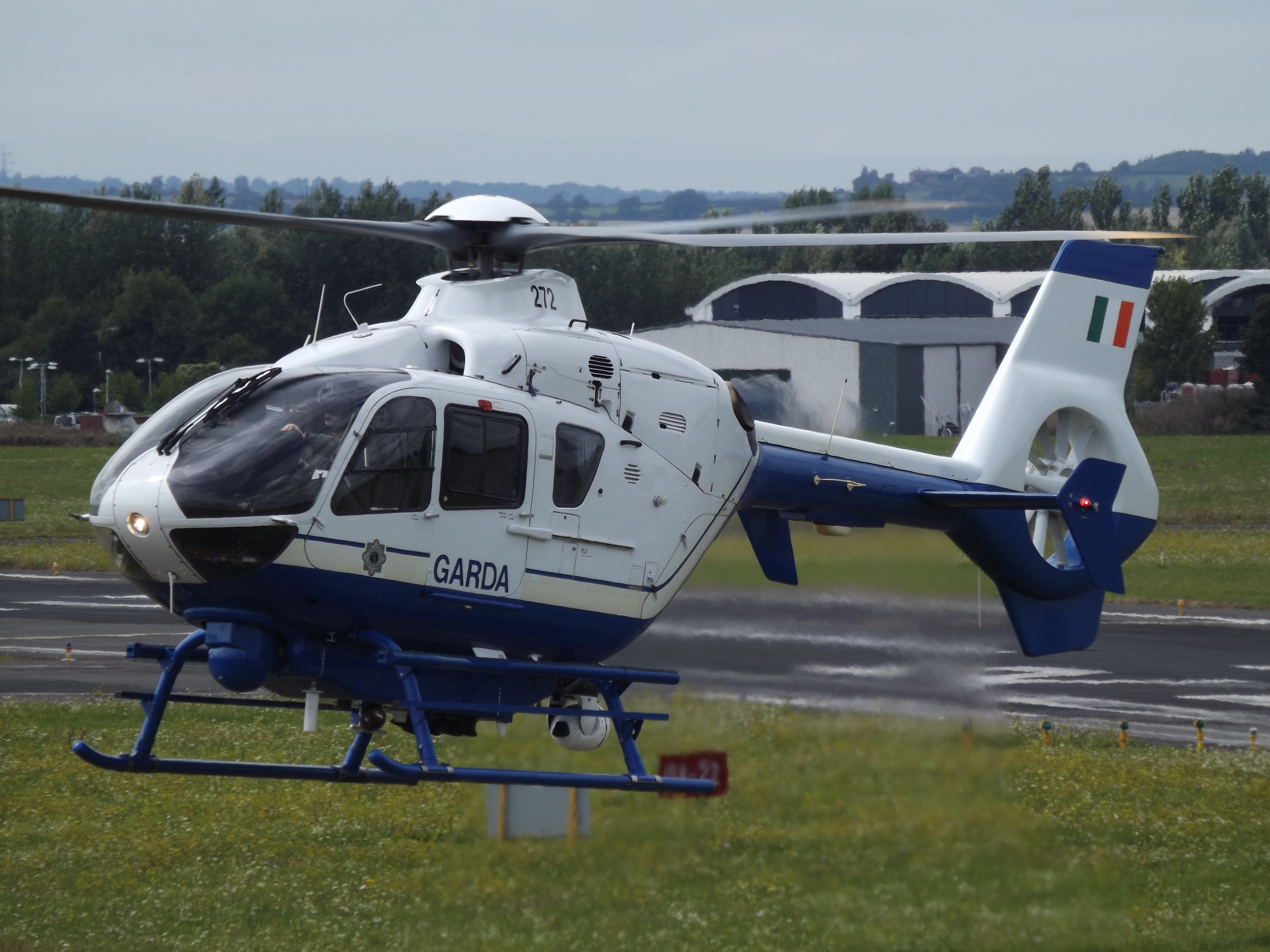
A Garda Eurocopter EC 135 T2

The Garda Air Support Unit (GASU) is a unit of the Garda Síochána which was formed in 1997. The GASU is part of the Operational Support Unit, which provides specialist support to Gardaí nationwide. The Operational Support Unit also includes the Water Support, Dog Support and Mounted Support Units.

Between 2007 and 2008, the unit released figures indicating that it had contributed to 1,300 arrests within the preceding three years, and it had located 14 people during search and rescue operations in 2007.

== Aircraft ==
The GASU's aircraft are maintained and flown by the Irish Air Corps, and based at Casement Aerodrome near Dublin.

As of December 2025 the unit operates two EC 135 T2 helicopters and a Viking Series 400 Twin Otter.

They formerly operated a Eurocopter AS355N Squirrel (Eceuriel) helicopter, which was in use by the unit from 1997 until January 2008, when the second EC 135 T2 replaced it. A Britten-Norman Defender, in operation since 1997, was placed into storage (pending disposal) in November 2023 and was replaced by the Twin Otter. The Squirrel and the Defender were the first two aircraft of the unit.

Aircraft	Origin	Variant	In service	Notes
Fixed wing airplane
DHC-6 Twin Otter	Canada	Guardian 400	1	Delivered in 2025 to replace the Britten Norman Defender 4000.
Helicopter
Eurocopter EC135	Germany	EC135 T2, EC135 T2+	2	Delivered in 2001 and 2007. To be replaced by 2 Airbus H145, ordered in 2023.
Retired aircraft
Britten-Norman Defender	United Kingdom	4000	1	1997-2023; replaced by 1 DHC-6 Twin Otter. Full type designation: Pilatus Britten-Norman BN 2T-4S Defender 4000.
Eurocopter AS355N Squirrel	France	AS355N	1	1997-2008; replaced by 2 Eurocopter EC135 T2. Also known as "Eceuriel" ("Squirrel" in French).

== Mandate ==
GASU responsibilities include providing an active support role for the Garda Síochána and aircraft may be deployed to incidents in the following circumstances:

- An immediate threat to life.
- Incidents of crime, terrorism or of national importance.
- Immediate threat of serious public disorder.
- A task which will lead to the immediate prevention or detection of crime.
- To gather evidence and to prevent or detect crime or to avert a serious public disorder.
- To gather information on and deal with incidents relating to crime, public disorder and traffic related matters.
- Collecting footage from the air at a major event.
