= 2023 Dublin riot =

Riot in Ireland following a stabbing

- Part of the Irish anti-immigration protests
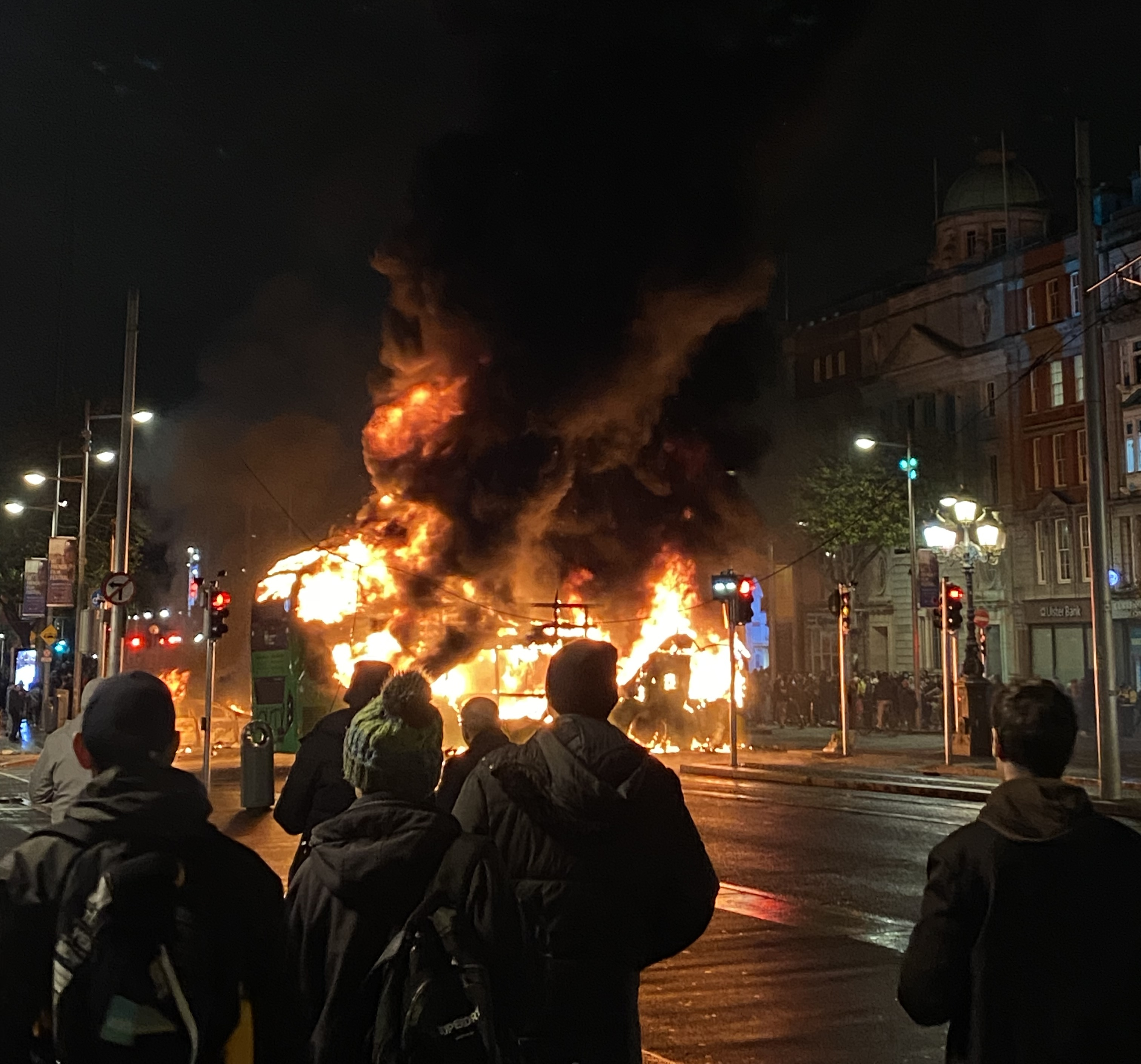
- Onlookers watch a Dublin Bus burning on O'Connell Street
- Date: 23 November 2023
- Location: Dublin, Ireland
- Caused by: Reaction to stabbing of a woman and three children by a migrant at Gaelscoil Choláiste Mhuire on Parnell Square East; Concerns over immigration; Misinformation
- Methods: Rioting; Protests; Looting; Vandalism; Arson; Assault
- Result: Gardaí deployed to disperse the crowd, numerous businesses and vehicles damaged

Result
- Injuries: 60 gardaí assaulted, three of whom seriously injured
- Arrested: 57, as of 19 November 2024
- Damage: 13 shops looted or damaged; 4 buses and 1 Luas tram destroyed; 11 Garda vehicles damaged
- Charged: 53, as of 19 November 2024

On the evening of 23 November 2023, a riot took place in Dublin, Ireland, which involved multiple incidents of vandalism, arson, and looting in the city centre as well as assaults on Gardaí (Irish police) and members of the public. Gardaí described the riot as the most violent in modern Dublin history, far surpassing the 2006 riots. Initial estimates by Dublin City Council suggested that the damage could cost up to €20 million, while then-Taoiseach, Leo Varadkar, stated that it could cost "tens of millions".

The riot was triggered by a man stabbing three young children and a care assistant at around 1:30 p.m. GMT that day outside a primary school in Parnell Square East, Dublin. A five-year-old girl was critically injured and the care assistant—who had tried to shield the children with her own body—was seriously injured. In the hours following the stabbings, far-right activists used social media and messaging apps to spread public anger over immigration. At a later point, the suspect was identified as Riad Bouchaker, originally from Algeria. Bouchaker was subsequently found guilty of multiple counts of attempted murder and assault at the Central Criminal Court. The five-year-old girl was discharged from hospital in August 2024.

By 5 p.m., a crowd of 100 to 200 anti-immigrant demonstrators had gathered at Parnell Square. The unrest began at around 6 p.m. when demonstrators began throwing fireworks, flares and bottles at the Gardaí who were maintaining a cordon around the crime scene. Shortly before 7 p.m., a nearby Garda car was set on fire. Rioting progressed to the adjacent O'Connell Street, Dublin's main thoroughfare, and also spread to Capel Street and Parliament Street. At its peak, the rioting crowd was estimated at 500 people. Several Dublin Bus vehicles, Garda vehicles and a Luas tram were damaged or destroyed by arson and vandalism, and multiple shops were looted. In response, around 400 Gardaí were dispatched, including the largest deployment of Gardaí armed with riot gear in Ireland's history. Approximately 60 Gardaí were assaulted during the riot, three of whom sustained serious injuries. By 10 p.m., the rioters had been dispersed, with 34 arrests made that evening and further arrests made over subsequent days.

Following the riot, the Garda Commissioner, Drew Harris, blamed the events on a "lunatic, hooligan faction driven by a far-right ideology". Other public figures criticised policing in Dublin city and called for the resignations of Harris and the Minister for Justice, Helen McEntee. The minister subsequently survived a vote of no confidence in Dáil Éireann. The government implemented additional riot-prevention measures after the incident, borrowing water cannons from the Police Service of Northern Ireland, passing new laws enabling the use of police body cameras, and announcing plans to expand the use of hand-held video cameras, tasers, and pepper spray.

== Stabbings ==
Gaelscoil Choláiste Mhuire stabbings
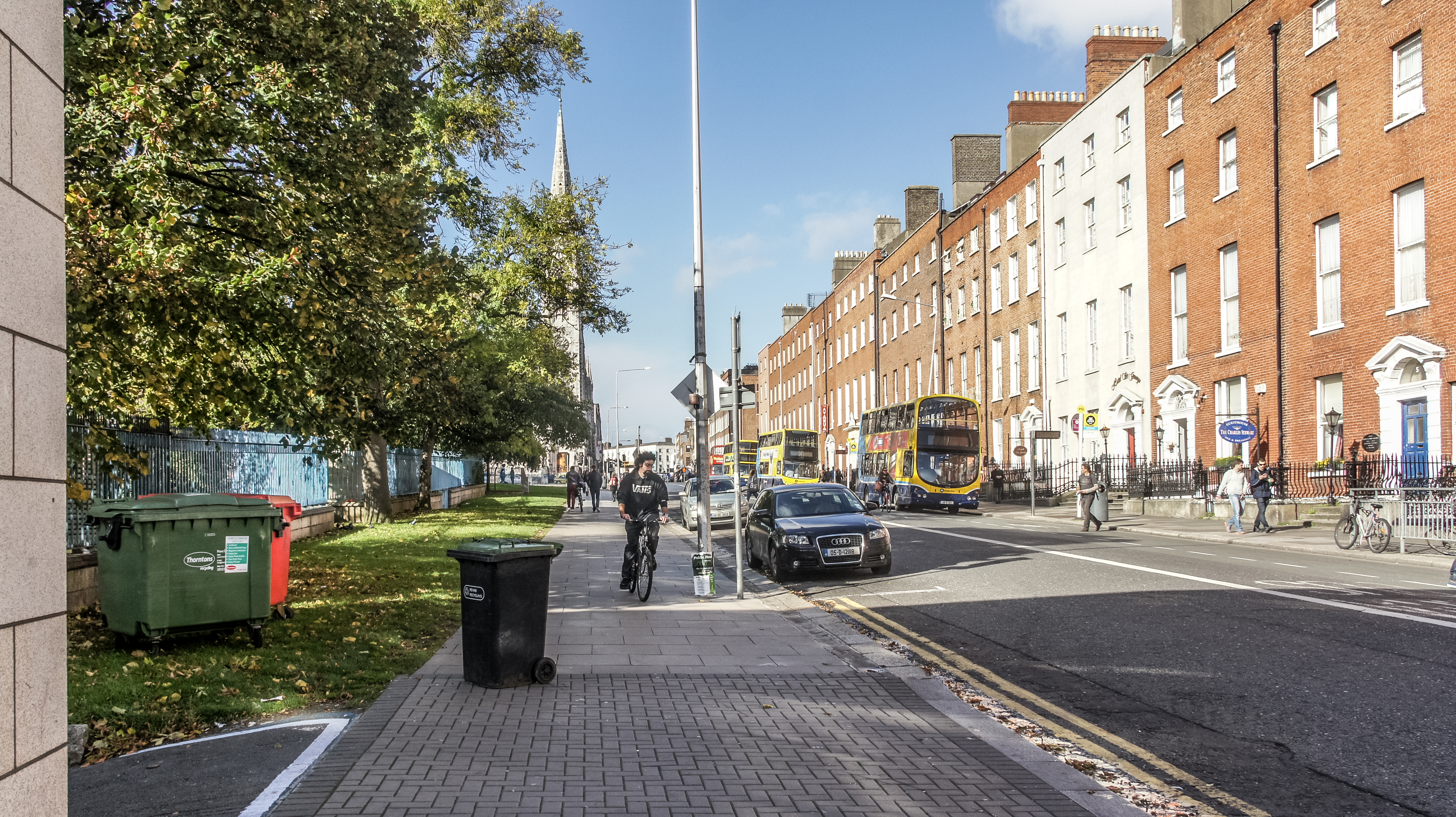
- Parnell Square East, facing north. The attack occurred on the east side of the street.
- Location: 4 Parnell Square East; Dublin 1
- Date: 23 November 2023; 1:30 pm GMT
- Weapon: 10-inch knife
- Deaths: 0
- Injuries: 5 (including the attacker)
- Perpetrator: Riad Bouchaker
- Motive: Unknown

On 23 November 2023, at approximately 1:30 pm GMT, a man armed with a knife attacked a group of young children outside Gaelscoil Choláiste Mhuire, a primary school in Parnell Square East, Dublin. The man critically injured a five-year-old girl and seriously injured Leanne Flynn Keogh, a care assistant in her 30s who had tried to protect the children. Two other children, a five-year-old boy and six-year-old girl, sustained less serious injuries and were discharged from hospital shortly after the incident. Flynn Keogh spent more than a week in intensive care before being moved to a high-dependency unit and then to a ward. She was discharged from the hospital shortly before Christmas. The five-year-old girl spent extended periods in a paediatric intensive care unit. She was eventually discharged from hospital in August 2024.

The attacker was disarmed by three passers-by who intervened: Warren Donohoe from Baltinglass, County Wicklow; Caio Benicio, a delivery driver from Brazil; and Alan Loren-Guille, a 17-year-old trainee chef from France. Donohoe grabbed the attacker, whom Benicio then struck with his motorcycle helmet, knocking him to the ground and incapacitating him. Loren-Guille wrested the knife from the man, suffering minor injuries to his hand and face in the process. After others began kicking the attacker as he lay on the ground, two women—a local and an American tourist—formed a protective ring around him, urging onlookers to wait for the Gardaí to arrive. Another man safeguarded the attacker's knife until Gardaí could retrieve it.

Detained by Gardaí and taken to a Dublin hospital after suffering serious injuries, the suspect was later reported to be of Algerian origin. He had lived in Ireland for 20 years and had become a naturalised Irish citizen in 2014. He had appeared in court in June 2023, charged with possession of a knife and criminal damage to a car. Garda commissioner Drew Harris described the attack as "standalone" and stated that it was not terrorism-related. A Garda superintendent said no other individuals were wanted by the gardaí in connection with the attacks.

On 21 December 2023, the suspect was named Riad Bouchaker (Arabic: رياض بوشاكر, romanized: Riyāḍ Būshakar), a 50-year-old man from Algeria. Bouchaker was charged in Dublin District Court on that day with three counts of attempted murder of three children and one count of serious harm to an adult, as well as two counts of assault causing harm to two other children and one charge of assault of another adult. When further charged with the possession and production of a 36-centimetre kitchen knife, he replied: "I am a sick person." On 22 February 2024, Bouchaker appeared at Cloverhill District Court. The court was told that the Director of Public Prosecutions had completed work on a large and complex book of evidence, and Bouchaker was sent forward for trial at the Central Criminal Court. The court directed that the media refrain from naming Bouchaker's legal representatives, due to "safety concerns" and "after what occurred around the city". Bouchaker's trial began in June 2026.

== Riot ==
Location of O'Connell Street in Dublin

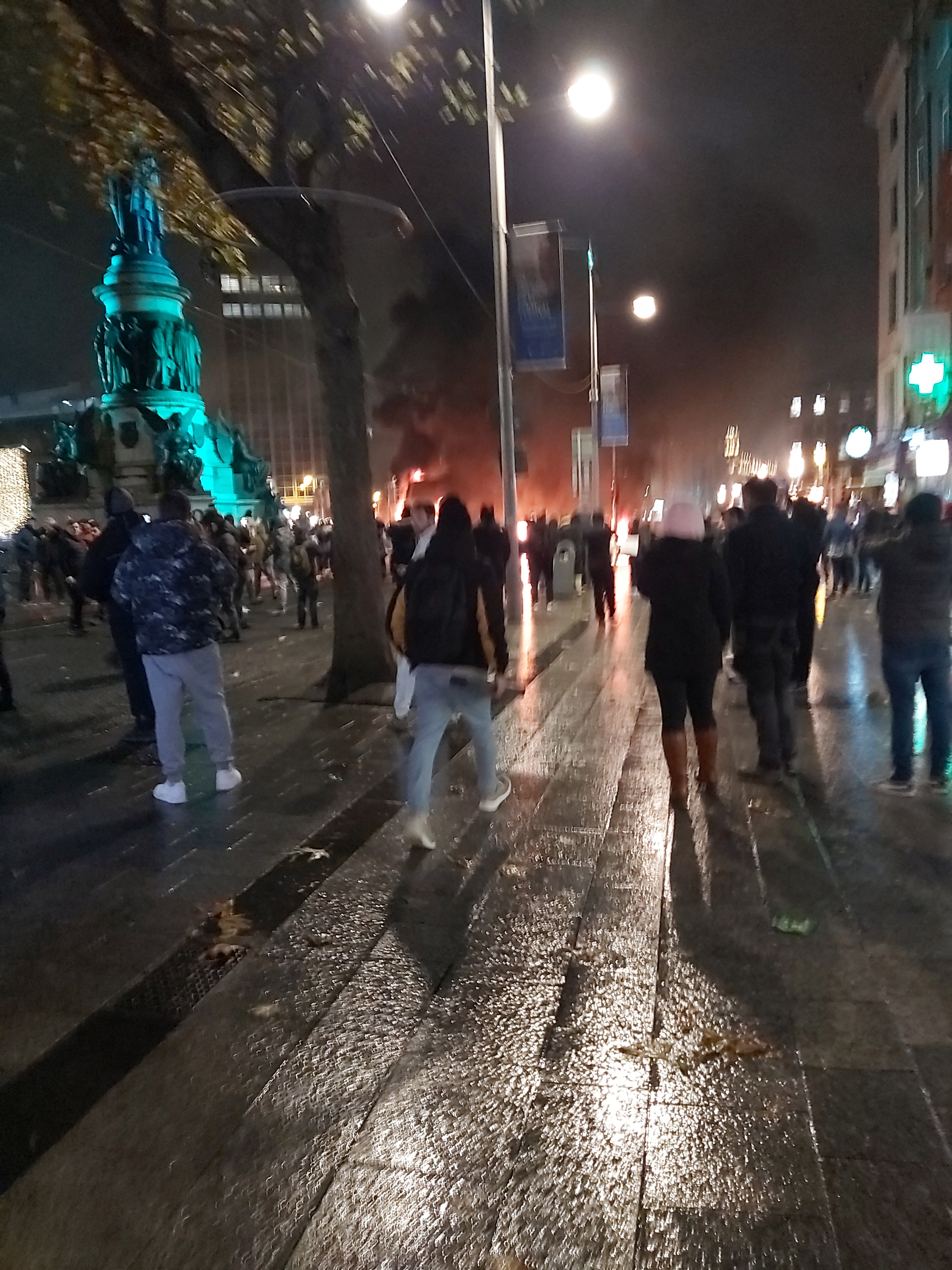
O'Connell Street at 7:38 pm

Following the stabbing incident, rumours spread on the WhatsApp, Telegram and Signal messaging apps that the attacker was an illegal immigrant, and that the children were dead. They stated that the attack was an act of Islamic terrorism and claimed that the stabbings were part of a larger pattern of violent attacks by immigrants, including the murder of Ashling Murphy, a 23-year-old Irish primary school teacher whose killer, Slovak immigrant Jozef Puška, had been sentenced six days earlier. Members of the far right urged people to go to the scene and "make your feelings known"; they used the hashtag #Irelandisfull.

By 5 pm, a crowd had gathered at the top of O'Connell Street, near the scene of the stabbings, some carrying the flag of Ireland or placards with anti-immigration slogans such as "Irish Lives Matter". Around 6 pm, the crowd of between 100 and 200 people, was joined by youths carrying metal bars and wearing facial coverings (including balaclavas and hoods). A small number of people were reported to be shouting anti-immigration slogans at gardaí. Members of the crowd began throwing fireworks, flares and bottles at the gardaí who were maintaining a cordon at the crime scene. Vehicles were vandalised and set on fire, including Garda vehicles, buses, and a Luas tram. Shops and businesses were looted and set on fire. At the peak of the riot, the crowd grew to about 500 people and spread to Capel Street and Parliament Street. Members of the Garda Public Order Unit were deployed to the area. A witness described the rioters as "young people—late-teens, early-20s" who were being "egged on" by older people. By this point, social media users on Telegram encouraged rioters to target foreigners, stating to "kill everyone you come across."

In response to the rioting, Luas and Dublin Bus suspended their services. Many businesses near the scene closed early or cancelled events. Tara Street railway station was closed by Iarnród Éireann. Trinity College, which is close to the scene, imposed a lockdown and closed all gates to its campus. A police cordon was created at the Oireachtas building at Leinster House, while officers from the Mounted Support Unit were deployed in nearby Grafton Street.

Garda Commissioner Drew Harris stated a "complete lunatic hooligan faction driven by far-right ideology" was behind the violence and condemned it as "disgraceful". He also called upon people "to act responsibly and not to listen to the misinformation and rumour that is circulating on social media." He also denied that the Gardaí had failed to protect the city from the violence, calling the response to the stabbing unanticipated. Garda sources later told The Irish Times that the events were unlike anything seen in modern Dublin history, surpassing by far the levels of violence and criminal damage seen during the 2006 "Love Ulster" riots. Minister for Justice Helen McEntee said the incident saw the largest deployment of riot gardaí to a public order situation in Ireland's history.

At around 10 pm, gardaí reported that most of the crowds had dispersed and that the city centre was "mainly calm". More than 400 officers were retained to keep order after the violence subsided.

== Arrests, injuries and damage ==
Gardaí initially reported that they had made 34 arrests in connection with the rioting. They made further arrests after 23 November, after families and friends called the Gardaí to turn in rioters. Up to 60 gardaí were assaulted, three of whom suffered serious injuries. One garda was hospitalised with a severe injury to his toe, another garda suffered a broken ankle, while a third officer broke three fingers on one of his hands.

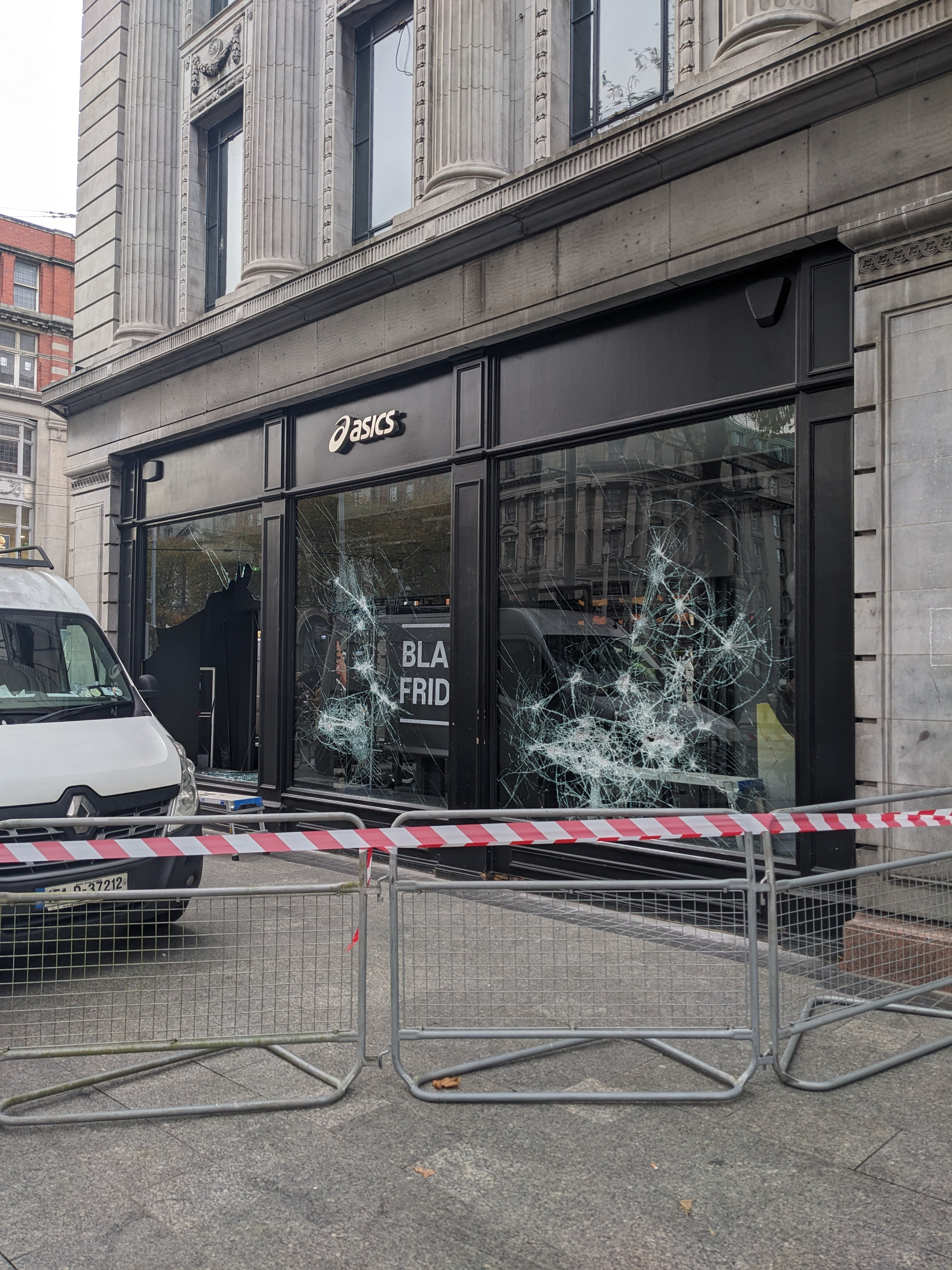
Asics sportswear shop was broken into and looted.

Thirteen shops suffered significant damage or looting which included the theft of charity boxes. Among the shops looted were Arnotts on Henry Street and Foot Locker on O'Connell Street. Three Dublin Bus vehicles were destroyed by arson—two of them hybrid buses estimated to cost €570,000 each, and a diesel bus valued at €350,000—and six other buses were damaged. Two garda patrol cars were destroyed by arson and 15 other garda vehicles were damaged. A Luas tram was set on fire, with sources stating that it may have to be replaced at a cost of €5 million.

The Dublin Fire Brigade said one of its fire engines that responded to the stabbing scene was "pelted with projectiles" and "beaten with iron implements" while attending to a refugee centre that was petrol bombed during the riots.

In July 2024 eight men and one woman were arrested in Dublin, bringing the total number arrested in connection with the riots to 49. All were held in Garda stations in Dublin and ten locations were searched.

== Aftermath ==
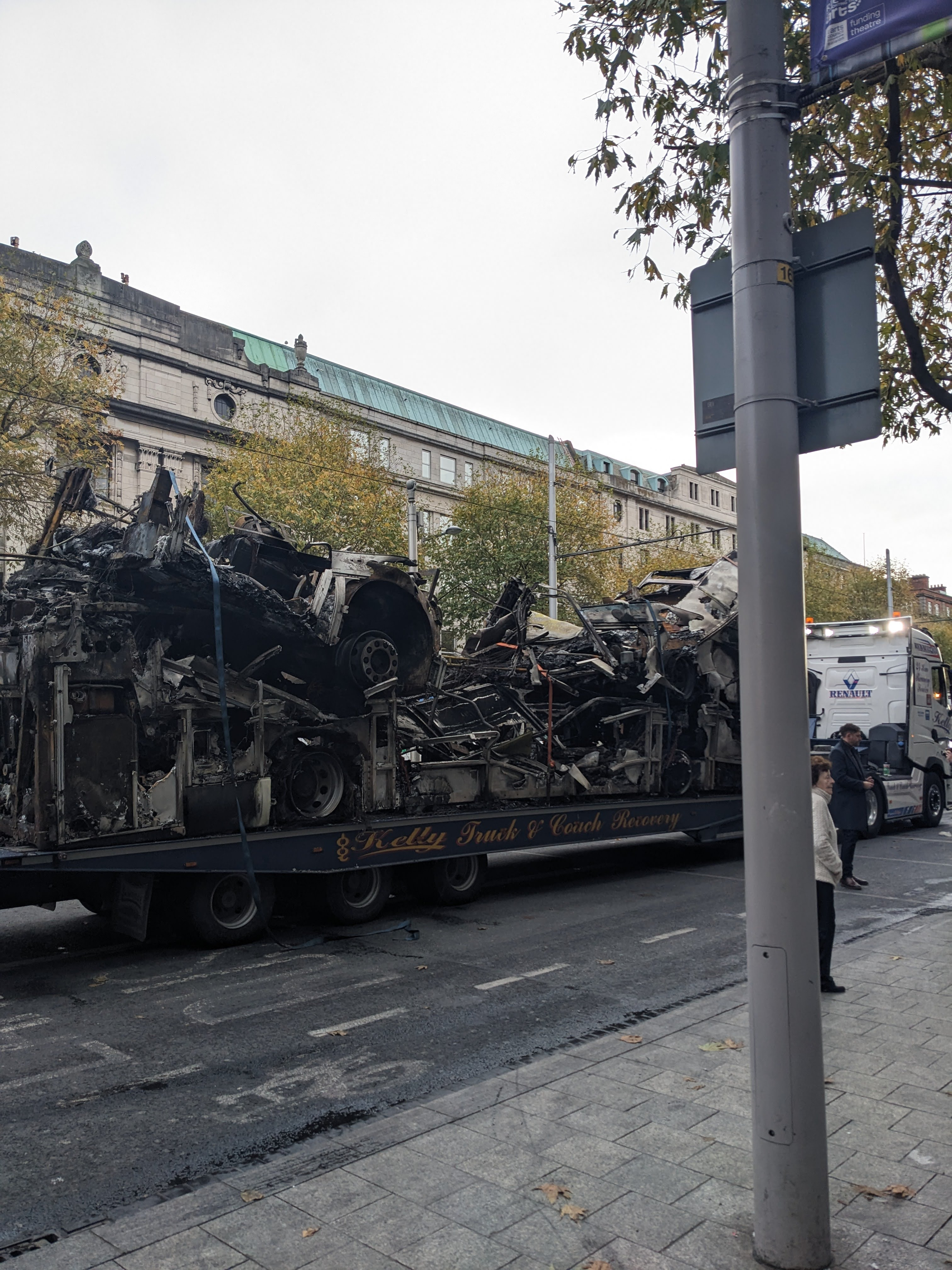
Wreckage removal

On the following morning of 24 November, the Luas Red Line ran a limited service between Tallaght/Saggart and Smithfield. The Green Line ran a limited service between St Stephen's Green and Brides Glen.

Some schools in the vicinity of the riot closed early on 24 November and Temple Street Children's Hospital cancelled clinics for the day, although it remained open for emergencies.

The riot, which occurred a day before the Black Friday shopping day, curtailed consumer spending on that day as most people were likely to avoid the city centre of Dublin. Some businesses opened late and closed early the day after the riots. Arnott's reopened for business from noon until 6 pm on 24 November following extensive overnight cleanup by staff. The General Post Office on O'Connell Street also reopened for business at noon on 24 November. The Chief Executive of Retail Excellence reported that trading fell 70% in Dublin city centre compared to the previous Black Friday. On 30 November Bank of Ireland analysis of credit and debit card spending showed that spending was down 46% compared to the previous year on the nearest Friday.

The Muslim Sisters of Éire charity organisation said that it would be unable to provide its usual support for the homeless on O'Connell Street on 24 November, as it feared for the safety of its volunteers.

The GoFundMe 'Buy Caio Benicio a pint', was set up the day after the attack for the man who incapacitated the attacker, raising over €300,000 in less than 24 hours.

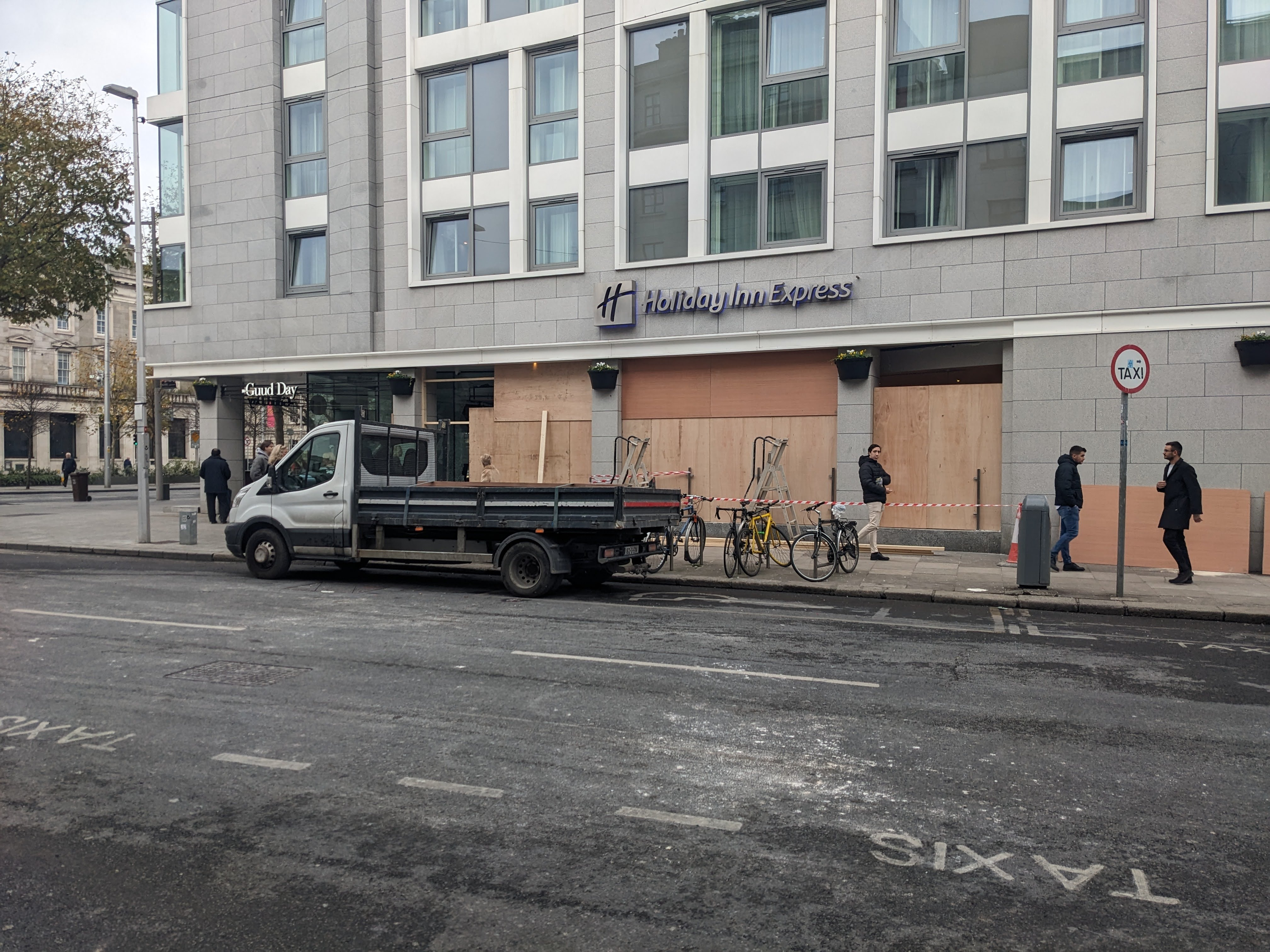
The Holiday Inn Express hotel was broken into

Minister McEntee said gardaí were trawling through 6,000 hours of CCTV footage and vowed that further arrests would follow, while Taoiseach Leo Varadkar said damage to public infrastructure from the unrest could cost "tens of millions of euros to repair".

Fearing further unrest, two water cannons were loaned to An Garda Síochána from the Police Service of Northern Ireland, for use until the end of the year.

On the night of 24 November, gardaí made arrests on O'Connell Street after a smaller number of people attempted to create unrest for a second night in a row. A high visibility policing plan was put in place throughout the weekend, including the deployment of four public order units.

Pressure mounted on the government and gardaí in the wake of the riots as McEntee insisted she would not resign and Commissioner Harris denied there were "personnel failures" inside the force. They were subsequently called upon to appear before the Oireachtas Justice Committee to address the violence and disruption on Dublin's streets.

On 19 November 2024 Gardaí released images of more than 90 persons of interest they want to interview. Gardaí have over 17,000 hours of CCTV footage, which they are still reviewing. They have taken over 1,100 statements, arrested 57 people and are following more than 500 lines of inquiry. Two days later, 18 of them were identified. By 23 November 56 of them had been identified.

=== Legal proceedings ===
On 24 November, 32 people (28 men and 4 women) appeared in court in Dublin in connection with the riot. Their charges included weapons offences, public order offences and theft of items such as clothing and cigarettes.

On 18 November 2024, a man who pleaded guilty to five charges - including arson, criminal damage and disorder - was the first of the rioters to be convicted. He was remanded in custody for sentencing later in the week. He was jailed for six and a half years on 20 November. He had set a Garda car on fire and attacked a centre for housing immigration applicants.

On 5 December 2024, a 49-year-old man was charged with assaulting two Gardaí on Parnell Street. He was also accused of attempting to damage a Garda car, violent disorder, criminal damage to property and producing a bottle in order to intimidate another person. He is due to appear at the Dublin District Court on 16 January 2025.

On 10 January 2025, a woman in her 30s was arrested and held in a Garda station in Dublin in connection with the riots. She was not one of the "people of interest" sought the previous November and her arrest brings the total number of arrests in relation to the riot to 65.

On 4 February 2025, a man was sentenced to four and a half years for damaging a bus, a garda car and looting a number of shops. He was the second person to be jailed in connection with the riots.

On 13 October 2025, a man was jailed for three years for rioting and setting a Luas tram on fire. He was 18 when he went into the city centre and took part in the riots. Around 7:30 that evening, he had broken the windows on a Luas and brought a burning bin on board, setting it on fire. Six months after the Dublin riot, he was involved in an anti-immigration protest and admitted that he had been involved in the riot. He pleaded guilty to the charges.

== Misinformation ==
Commissioner Harris attributed the riot to "hateful assumptions" based on material circulating online following the stabbings. This included claims that the attacker was a foreign national. The Gardaí had not revealed the suspect's personal information at that time.

After the rioting began, false information began circulating on social media that the Defence Forces had been deployed onto the streets. Images from a recent army training exercise that included armoured personnel carriers were attached to the misinformation in order to deceive readers. At 8:50 pm the Defence Force's official X (formerly Twitter) account debunked the rumours.

Coimisiún na Meán, Ireland's media regulator, said it was concerned about the spread of violent imagery, hate speech and disinformation on social media platforms following the unrest. There had been a focus on the role played by social media in the riots, with anti-immigrant rhetoric and misinformation being spread on some platforms. An analyst at the Institute for Strategic Dialogue also attributed the violence to failures by the Gardaí to take threats from the far right seriously and the government's failure to tackle a continuing housing crisis, which enabled the spread of anti-immigrant sentiment.

== Reactions ==
=== Domestic ===
==== Governmental ====
President Michael D. Higgins stated that his thoughts were with the victims of the attack, and said "that it would be used or abused by groups with an agenda that attacks the principle of social inclusion is reprehensible and deserves condemnation by all those who believe in the rule of law and democracy."

Taoiseach Leo Varadkar said he was "shocked" by the knife attack and praised the emergency services for responding "very quickly". He said later that the rioters had brought "shame" to Dublin for their families and themselves, and were not motivated by patriotism but by "hate" and their "love" of "violence", "chaos", and "causing pain to others", and pledged to use the "full resources of the law, the full machinery of the state to punish those involved" in what he called "grotesque events". Varadkar also pledged to pass new laws to enable police "to make better use of" CCTV evidence and "modernise" laws regarding hate and incitement.

Minister for Justice Helen McEntee said that a "thuggish and manipulative element must not be allowed to use an appalling tragedy to wreak havoc". She also announced the allocation of €4.4 million to buy additional vehicles for the Gardaí.

Former Lord Mayor of Dublin, Nial Ring, said he spoke to parents and children of the school where the attack took place, and said "It's just something you don't expect. One of the main comments I heard was 'this only happens in America'."

Sinn Féin leader and Dublin Central TD Mary Lou McDonald, whose constituency covers the area affected by the violence, said the incident sent "shock and horror throughout the community". She also criticised the government, stating that although the Gardaí had her full support, she had "no confidence" in both McEntee and Garda Commissioner Harris. Another Dublin Central TD, Gary Gannon from the Social Democrats, called for McEntee and Harris to resign from their offices, calling their positions "untenable". Ivana Bacik, the leader of the Labour Party, also called for more gardaí to be deployed on the streets and acknowledged major problems around garda recruitment, adding that her party has not had confidence in the Government's handling of policing for some time. Meanwhile, Tánaiste and concurrent Minister for Foreign Affairs Micheál Martin expressed confidence in McEntee and Harris. Unnamed government ministers, TDs, and senators within Fianna Fáil and Fine Gael however said that McEntee's position was "untenable".

===== Motion of no confidence in McEntee =====
On 1 December, Sinn Féin tabled a motion of no confidence in Helen McEntee as Minister for Justice. The vote took place on 5 December. Party leader Mary Lou McDonald said the government was "not listening", and McEntee "refuses to acknowledge the political failures that allowed our communities to become unsafe".

In response, Fianna Fáil leader and Tánaiste, Micheál Martin, accused Sinn Féin of using "the only response one can expect from Sinn Féin": "to exploit the crisis".

The Government won the vote with 83 to 63.

==== Religious ====
Catholic Archbishop of Dublin Dermot Farrell described the stabbing attack as "particularly distressing" and commended the emergency services for their response. He also said he was praying for the injured, their families, and all those affected, and invited the people of Dublin to join him in prayer.

Church of Ireland Archbishop of Dublin Michael Jackson extended his concern and compassion to those affected by the stabbings and thanked the emergency services for their response. He also said he was praying for the injured, for those living in Dublin and for those involved in keeping the peace in the capital.

Umar Al-Qadri, the Chair of the Irish Muslim Peace & Integration Council, advised members of the Muslim community to avoid travelling into Dublin city centre the weekend after the riot. He said his thoughts were with those injured at the attack at the school and he was shocked at the riot. The morning after the riot, numbers attending Friday prayers in mosques were low and many Muslim children did not travel to school. Al-Qadri advised weekend schools in mosques to suspend activities.

==== Other ====
The Association of Garda Sergeants and Inspectors said that Garda officers in Dublin needed more support and called on officers from outside the city to be brought in to supplement them. Dermot O'Leary, general secretary of the National Bus and Rail Union condemned the "appalling violence" in Dublin following the decision to halt transport services due to the rioting. In response to the stabbing, the Irish National Teachers' Organisation said its hearts were "with the entire school community of Gaelscoil Choláiste Mhuire following the horrendous incident that has taken place".

The Dublin Chamber of Commerce said "Public safety is a cornerstone of any civic society, and any threat to it must be dealt with swiftly".

=== International ===
Ursula von der Leyen, president of the European Commission, stated in a social media post that she was "shocked by the brutal attack that injured several people in Dublin, including children".

French President Emmanuel Macron thanked Loren-Guille, who helped apprehend the stabber, for "this act of bravery which helped save lives and which makes us all proud". The Ministry for Europe and Foreign Affairs added that it was sending its "thoughts to the victims of this attack and their families" and stood "with Ireland and the Irish people".

Elon Musk criticised the Irish government saying that Taoiseach Leo Varadkar "hates the Irish people", adding: "The current Irish government clearly cares more about praise from woke media than their own people." In response, Minister for Transport Eamon Ryan said these comments show "how little he [Musk] knows about the country", and that "in my mind, [Musk's position is] being abused and misused".

Former British prime minister Boris Johnson labelled the violent scenes in Dublin "race riots", and suggested that "achingly liberal" countries like Ireland now had concerns about the pace of immigration.

Following the riot, the Algerian embassy in Dublin circulated warnings to community groups advising Algerian citizens to "show the utmost caution and vigilance, and to avoid places that have been the subject of violence and vandalism", in particular Dublin city centre.

== See also ==
- Irish anti-immigration protests
- 2006 Dublin riots
- 2021 Dublin riots
- Nahel Merzouk riots
- 2024 United Kingdom riots
- 2025 Northern Ireland riots
