= Fiosrú – the Office of the Police Ombudsman =

Irish police complaint-handling organisation

Fiosrú – Office of the Police Ombudsman
- Irish: Oifig an Ombudsman Póilineachta

Agency overview
- Formed: 2 April 2025; 16 months ago
- Preceding agency: Garda Síochána Ombudsman Commission, Garda Síochána Complaints Board
- Jurisdiction: Ireland
- Headquarters: 150 Upper Abbey Street, Dublin 1
- Agency executive: Emily Logan, Police Ombudsman
- Website: Official website

Fiosrú – Office of the Police Ombudsman is an independent statutory body in Ireland charged with oversight of the Garda Síochána, the national police force. It was established in December 2005 as Garda Síochána Ombudsman Commission (known as GSOC) as a three-member body under the Garda Síochána Act 2005 to deal with complaints from members of the public about the conduct and actions (or lack of actions) of Gardaí. It was reconstituted as a single-person ombudsman in April 2025 under the Policing, Security and Community Safety Act 2024.

Emily Logan was appointed as the Police Ombudsman on 2 April 2025.

GSOC replaced the Garda Síochána Complaints Board. GSOC had more powers than its predecessor and, unlike the Complaints Board, it is not made up of members of the force. The first three commissioners were appointed in February 2006 and the commission commenced hearing complaints in May 2007.

== Powers, functions and membership ==
Fiosrú is empowered to:

- Directly and independently investigate complaints against members of the Garda Síochána
- Investigate any matter, even where no complaint has been made, where it appears that a Garda may have committed an offence or behaved in a way that would justify disciplinary proceedings
- Investigate any practice, policy or procedure of the Garda Síochána with a view to reducing the incidence of related complaints

Fiosrú is mandated to provide an independent and effective civilian oversight of policing and to deal with the public's complaints concerning Gardaí fairly and efficiently so that everyone can have confidence in the complaints system.

In January 2022, the commissioners were Rory MacCabe, Emily Logan and Hugh Hume.

In budget 2019, GSOC's budget was increased and additional staff were allocated, with the Minister for Justice expressing his confidence that this would help it function.

== History ==
Over 2000 complaints were made against the Garda Síochána in 2009, with a similar number of complaints by 2017. The Garda Commissioner referred over 100 incidents where the conduct of a garda resulted in death or serious injury to the Ombudsman for investigation. Also newly instrumented, the Garda Síochána Ombudsman Commission (referred to colloquially as the Garda Ombudsman or simply abbreviated to GSOC) replaces the earlier system of complaints (the Garda Síochána Complaints Board). Becoming fully operational on 9 May 2007, the commission is empowered to:

- Directly and independently investigate complaints against members of the Garda Síochána
- Investigate any matter, even where no complaint has been made, where it appears that a Garda may have committed an offence or behaved in a way that justified disciplinary proceedings
- Investigate any practice, policy or procedure of the Garda Síochána with a view to reducing the incidence of related complaints

The commission's first chairman was Kevin Haugh (a High Court Judge) who died in early 2009, shortly before his term of office was to conclude.

=== 2007 ===
GSOC deal with many complaints each year. According to its 2007 Annual Report, in its first year GSOC received 2,084 complaints from members of the public and 294 referrals from the Garda Commissioner. A total of 556 allegations were deemed inadmissible. Since the inception of the office, GSOC had sent nine files to the Director of Public Prosecutions (DPP), five of which the director decided not to proceed with prosecution. A decision on the other four were pending.

==== Corrib gas controversy ====
Because of the large number of complaints in 2007 from County Mayo, arising from protests linked to the Corrib gas controversy, the Commission wrote to Minister for Justice, Equality and Law Reform Brian Lenihan requesting a review of how the protests were policed under section 106 of the Garda Síochána Act. The minister said he "did not feel it was appropriate to proceed". His successor Dermot Ahern gave a similar answer in the Dáil when the request was repeated by Sinn Féin two months later.

GSOC recommended that disciplinary action be taken against an unnamed senior member of the Garda Síochána in relation to the handling of a Shell to Sea protest in north Mayo. The GSOC investigation was undertaken under section 95 of the Garda Síochána Act 2005, after receipt of complaints over Garda handling of a protest at Pollathomas pier in June 2007. Some 20 civilians and two Gardaí were injured when a landowner objected to trespass on his property by contractors for Shell EP Ireland. Some 68 Gardaí were contacted by GSOC, a move criticised by the Association of Garda Sergeants and Inspectors.

Up to October 2009, GSOC had received a total of 111 complaints in regard to policing of the protests, of which 78 were deemed admissible. Seven files were referred to the Director of Public Prosecutions, who did not authorise criminal prosecution of Gardaí in any of the seven cases.

=== 2008 ===
In 2008, a total of 4,227 allegations arose from 2,681 complaints. Allegations of abuse of authority, neglect of duty and discourtesy constituted 75 per cent of complaints received. Assault accounted for 13 per cent. A total of 1,360 allegations were deemed inadmissible. The 2008 report stated that 31 files were sent to the Director of Public Prosecutions (DPP), identifying 44 potential defendants. The DPP gave 11 directions for prosecution. One Garda was convicted of dangerous driving, arising from a GSOC investigation of an incident in 2007. Ten others were awaiting court dates at the end of 2008, the report said. The DPP gave 30 directions for no prosecution. GSOC received 129 referrals from the Garda Commissioner, in cases in which it appeared to the commissioner that the conduct of a Garda may have resulted in the death of, or serious harm to, a person.

=== 2011 ===
In February 2011, the Commission rejected allegations by the Garda Representative Association that it behaved in an "excessive and oppressive" manner when gathering evidence in the case of a Garda who was charged with assault.

=== 2012 ===
In December 2012, GSOC exercised its powers of arrest for the first time, detaining a County Galway Garda for questioning in relation to an allegation of sexual assault.

=== 2014 ===
In March 2014, GSOC was reported to be investigating a case in which a mother-of-one, who was viciously assaulted by three women in Galway, said a Garda lied to her about the scheduling of a number of court dates for the case.

In May 2014, GSOC was reported to be investigating the death of a teenager whose body was found in a stream close to the Sallybrook estate of garda superintendent Michael Leacy in Dungarvan, County Waterford.

In May 2014, GSOC was reported to be investigating a fatal car crash which occurred after Gardaí followed a car in Dublin.

==== Surveillance controversy ====
In the Irish edition of The Sunday Times on Sunday 9 February 2014, journalist John Mooney reported that the Garda Síochána Ombudsman Commission suspected that it was under surveillance. Mooney explained how GSOC had hired the services of a UK counter-surveillance firm, Verrimus, to investigate. A briefing about the investigation given to Justice Minister Alan Shatter was subsequently leaked to the media.

=== 2015 ===
The chairman of GSOC, Simon O'Brien, resigned on 30 January to take up a position with the Pensions Ombudsman Service in the UK. There had been calls for his resignation by Alan Shatter and representatives of the 1,000 rank-and-file Gardaí based in Dublin's South Central Division over the surveillance controversy.

In March 2015, "based on the level of public disquiet it generated" it was announced that GSOC would investigate an incident whereby a homeless man was handcuffed, pepper sprayed and trampled on by a Garda on Henry Street.

In November 2015, footage emerged of a civilian being attacked with a police baton in County Wexford. The matter was referred to GSOC.

In the same month, a young man died while in police custody at Dublin Airport. The matter was also referred to GSOC.

=== 2016 ===
In February 2016, it was reported that the wife of former garda press officer Superintendent David Taylor made a complaint to GSOC over a failure to preserve evidence.

In May 2016, the Irish Examiner reported that GSOC queried the independence of the inquiry that produced the Guerin Report and attempted to have it extend its timeframe of investigation so as to complete its work more thoroughly.

=== 2023 ===
Following the murder trial for David Byrne in April 2023, during which Gerry Hutch, a member of the Hutch Crime family from Dublin, was found not guilty; a senior GSOC investigator resigned following reports the individual had attended a house party hosted by Mr Hutch following the verdict. It is reported that the individual disclosed the fact to colleagues. The conflict of interest and resignation triggered a Garda investigation into GSOC. Separately, as of April 2023, four members of the Garda Síochána have been suspended pending investigation of leaks of confidential Garda information to the Hutch family.

=== 2025 ===
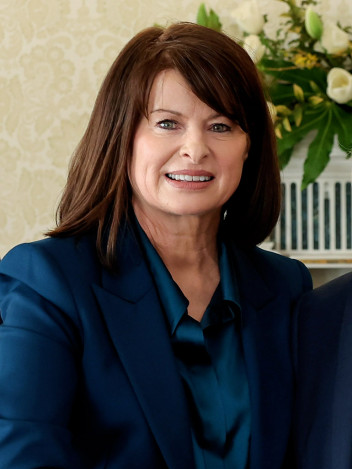
Emily Logan in 2025

In April 2025, Fiosrú replaced the Garda Síochána Ombudsman Commission (GSOC) as Ireland's independent policing oversight agency, assuming responsibility for handling public complaints against members of the Garda Síochána. This change formed part of the Policing, Security and Community Safety Act 2024, which came into effect in April of that year. The legislation dissolved the previous three-person commission model used by Gsoc and introduced a single Police Ombudsman structure. Emily Logan, formerly the chief commissioner of the Irish Human Rights and Equality Commission and Ombudsman for Children, was appointed as the State's first Police Ombudsman.

The 2024 Act gave legislative effect to several recommendations made by the Commission on the Future of Policing in Ireland. It repealed the Garda Síochána Act 2005 and established new entities, including a Garda Board, an Office of the Independent Examiner of Security Legislation, and a National Office for Community Safety. While the reform was welcomed by several stakeholders, including the Irish Council for Civil Liberties (ICCL), it was also subject to criticism. The ICCL argued that the legislation only partially implemented the comprehensive reforms proposed in the Future of Policing in Ireland report. Particular concern was expressed regarding transparency and accountability, with oversight bodies such as the former Policing Authority and GSOC previously noting that national security was frequently cited to deny them access to critical information. The ICCL maintained that effective oversight was essential to sustaining human rights-based reforms within Ireland's democratic society.

== Commissioners ==
- denotes chairpersons

Name	Term of office
Kevin Haugh	February 2006 – January 2009
Conor Brady	February 2006 – December 2011
Carmel Foley	February 2006 – December 2016
Dermot Gallagher	April 2009 – December 2011
Simon O'Brien	December 2011 – January 2015
Kieran Fitzgerald	December 2011 – February 2021
Mark Toland	December 2016 – November 2017
Patrick F. Sullivan	July 2018 – February 2021
Mary Ellen Ring	August 2015 – December 2021
Emily Logan	February 2021 – April 2025
Hugh Hume	February 2021 – April 2025
Rory MacCabe	January 2022 – April 2025

== See also ==
- Ombudsman for the Defence Forces (ODF)
