= Alwyn Harris (police officer) =

British police officer (died 1989)

Alwyn Harris (died 8 October 1989) was a Royal Ulster Constabulary superintendent who was killed by the Provisional Irish Republican Army on 8 October 1989.

== Overview ==
Superintendent Harris was killed by an IRA bomb that exploded under his car while he was on his way to church with his wife; at the time of his death, he was subdivisional commander of Newcastle, County Down, but due to a serious heart condition was on extended sick leave. His wife survived the bombing with minor injuries. Harris had been in the RUC for 33 years exactly on the day of his death. His funeral was attended by thousands of people and brought the town of Lisburn, County Antrim, to a standstill.

While serving in Kilkeel, County Down, Harris had been responsible for the removal from duty of six members of the Royal Marines who had been accused of harassing a Catholic mother of three. Father Denis Faul, who had passed on the complaints, had been very impressed by Harris, saying that he was exactly the kind of officer on whom a trustworthy police force could be built.

Earlier in 1989, he had condemned the killing of one of his officers, Inspector David Ead. Harris was the third senior RUC officer killed by the IRA in 1989. No reason was given by the IRA for his killing, and no one was ever tried in connection with the bombing.

He was survived by his wife and two sons. One son, Drew Harris, became a PSNI officer and was Garda Commissioner in the Republic of Ireland for the Irish police force from 2018 until his retirement in September 2025.

== See also ==
- Ronan Kerr

== Bibliography ==
- Lost Lives:The stories of the men, women and children who died as a result of the Northern Ireland troubles, McKittrick, Kelters, Feeney, Thompson, 1999, (2006). ISBN 1-84018-227-X.
