= Expenses scandal =

Expenses scandal may refer to:

== Canada ==
- Senate expenses scandal
- Nova Scotia parliamentary expenses scandal
- Saskatchewan expenses scandal

== Ireland ==
- Ivor Callely expenses scandal
- FÁS expenses scandal
- John O'Donoghue expenses scandal

== United Kingdom ==
- United Kingdom parliamentary expenses scandal
