= Driving licence in Poland =

Document issued for motor vehicle operation in Poland

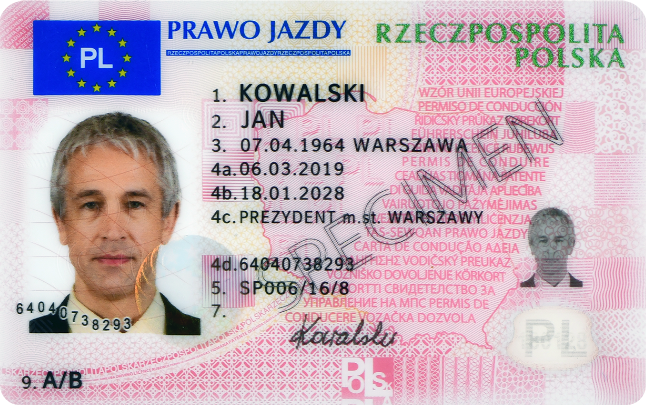
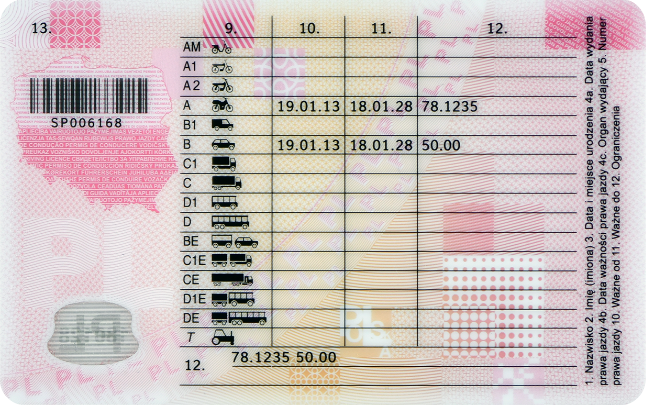
Polish driving licence issued since 2013

A driving licence in Poland (prawo jazdy) is a document issued by the relevant government agency, regional or local government, confirming the rights of the holder to drive motor vehicles.

== History of driving in Poland ==
With the proclamation of independence in 1918, the first Polish licences were issued. In 1921 the first Polish Highway Code was passed.

In today's Poland the conditions for entitlement is defined by the law of 20 June 1997 — the Road Traffic Act (Ustawa Prawo o Ruchu Drogowym).

The licences are produced in Poland by the Polish Security Printing Works (Polska Wytwórnia Papierów Wartościowych).

== Appearance ==
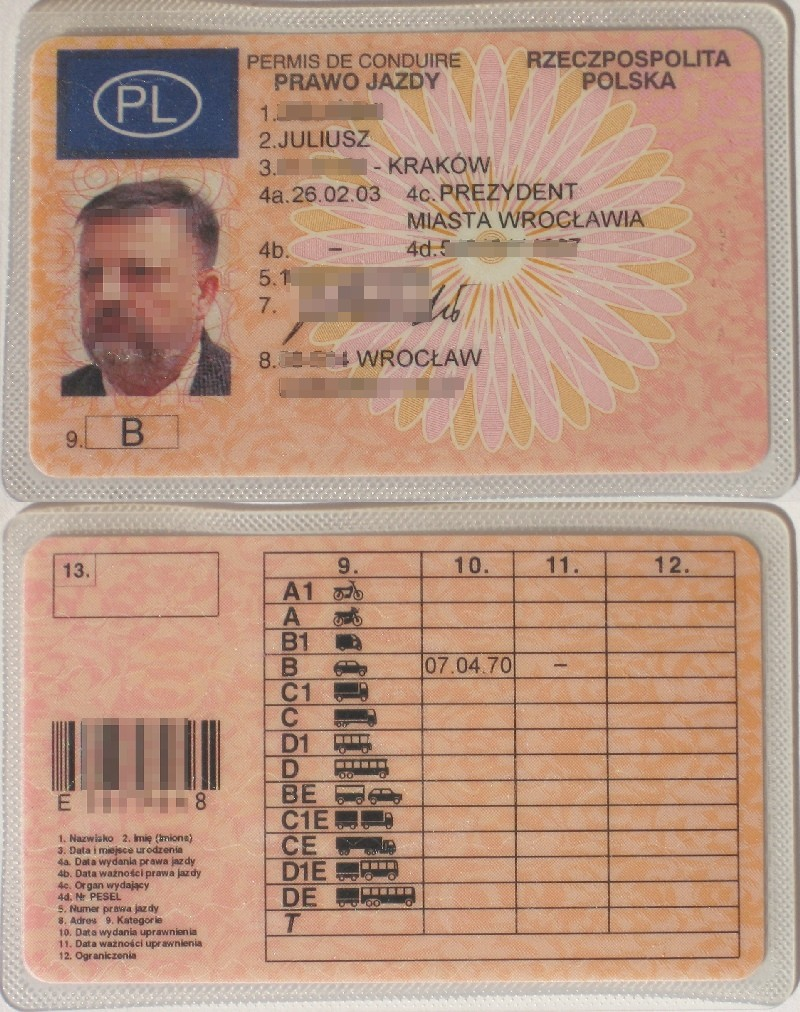
Polish driving licence issued in 2003

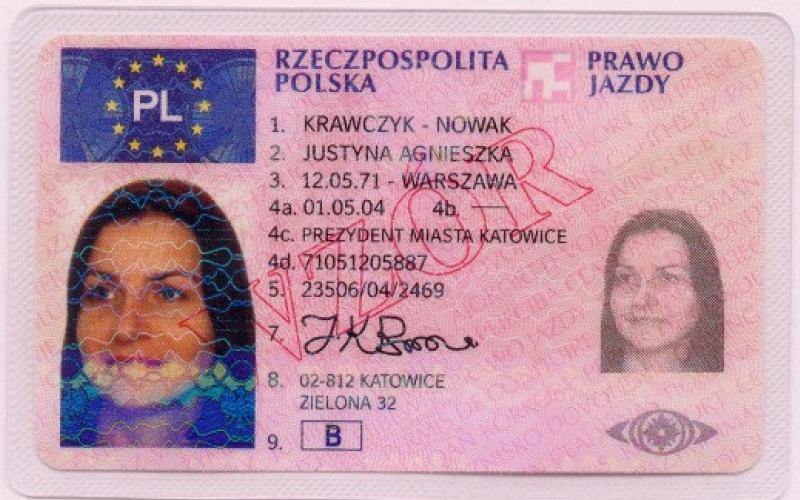
Polish driving licence issued after Polish EU accession

Licence used by drivers who are residents of the associated countries of the European Union have a standard look and contain the information of the driver, common to all countries, developed in 1998. Exceptions to this general rule apply to small parts of this document. Polish driving licences issued from the late 1990s comply with these standards.

Licence is embedded in a transparent plastic the shape and size of a credit card (85.6 × 53.98 mm; ID-1 format), which makes counterfeiting very difficult and ensures longevity.

After 1 May 2004 (the date of Polish EU accession), Polish driving licences were slightly changed:

- instead of an ellipse around the letters PL, in the upper left corner there are 12 stars
- the words "RZECZPOSPOLITA POLSKA" and "PRAWO JAZDY" switches place and the color was changed to match the blue in the EU flag.
- the photo is larger
- the background of the new licence contains the words "licence" in all EU languages.
- the French words "PERMIS DE CONDUIRE" was removed from the top, but is included in the background together with all EU languages

The licences issued before 1 May 2004 remain valid (do not have to be exchanged).

== EU driving licence ==
In 2006 the European Parliament adopted a directive 2006/126/EEC providing for a uniform driving licence in all Member States. New driving licences are issued from 19 January 2013. In Poland, the new driving licences are mandated by the law of 5 January 2011—the Motor Vehicle Drivers Act (Ustawa o Kierujących Pojazdami; Journal of Laws 2011 No. 30, item 151), that came into force on that day.

Driver's licenses issued from January 2013 are valid for up to 15 years - 5 years for professional drivers (categories C1, C, D1, D, C1+E, C+E, D1+E, D+E). Documents issued before January 19, 2013 are valid until 2033 and will have to be exchanged for the new ones by that date.

== Mistaken identity in Ireland ==
"Prawo Jazdy" was an alleged Polish criminal supposedly active in the Republic of Ireland. The name was listed on PULSE, a computer system used by the Garda Síochána, with at least 50 traffic violations, including speeding and parking violations, recorded across the country, but there were suspicious aspects such as each incident being associated with a different address. "Prawo Jazdy" was also listed as a name on the Fixed Charge Processing System (FCPS). An investigation was launched into this person whom the Gardaí considered to be Ireland's worst traffic violator.

An internal Garda memorandum in June 2007 revealed that, upon consultation with an online Polish–English bilingual dictionary, prawo jazdy was not a personal name, but instead the Polish term for 'driving licence', misidentified by Garda officers as the traffic violator's name due to the phrase being printed at the top right-hand corner of Polish driving licences (with the licensee's name and personal details printed beneath in a smaller text size). The error became public knowledge in February 2009.

The Gardaí received the satirical Ig Nobel Prize in literature in 2009 for the mistake, but did not attend the award ceremony. The prize was accepted by Karolina Lewestam, a Polish philosopher and writer, and a "holder of a Polish driver's licence".

The situation was a source of embarrassment for the Gardaí. It generated discussion on issues such as cultural ignorance or institutional racism within the Gardaí as a result of changing ethnic demography in Ireland due to immigration from other European Union member states.

In 2013, a common format for driving licences was implemented for all newly issued documents across the European Economic Area (EEA), of which both Ireland and Poland are part.

== See also ==
- European driving licence
- Polish passport
