= Brian Teeling =

Irish visual artist

Brian Teeling is an Irish visual artist whose work often focuses on queer sexuality and LGBT+ history. He grew up in Coolock, where his father worked as a mechanic. Teeling worked in fashion before becoming a photographer and later a multidisciplinary artist. Teeling has been profiled by the Irish Times, Irish Independent, Business Post, Irish Tatler, Dublin Inquirer, and Gay Community News.

After working with fashion retailers Topman, The Kooples, Brown Thomas and Indigo & Cloth, Teeling launched the menswear shop Nowhere with David Erixson (founder of Hyper Island) in Aungier Street, Dublin in 2015. In a review for The Irish Independent Sophie Donaldson declared that "the store has fearlessly injected the Irish menswear scene with individualism and oomph, garnering itself a loyal client base and becoming one of the country's foremost retail destinations for the boys." The Irish Time critic Deirdre McQuillan remarked "If Nowhere achieves anything it will be to encourage others to start creating more vitality on this historic street."

His piece Declan Flynn in Dublin was shortlisted for the 2021 Zurich Portrait Prize and was exhibited in the National Gallery of Ireland. Declan Flynn was an Irish gay man whose murder in a homophobic attack 1982 was a catalyst for the LGBT rights movement in the country. Teeling withdrew the piece in protest of the gallery awarding a contract to ooperate its café to Aramark, a company controversial for their profiting off prisons and direct provision. Teeling's work has also been exhibited in the Irish Museum of Modern Art. Writing for RTÉ.ie, artist Aideen Barry called the acts of Teeling and fellow protesting artists "affirmative and progressive acts of protest by people who are putting their practices at considerable risk for the greater good".

Teeling worked out of Dean Arts Studios on Chatham Row, and objected to threats to its closure, saying artists such as him could not afford rents elsewhere. Speaking to The Irish Times Teeling stated "Someone described me recently as 'a successful artist in Ireland'. I'm poor. I can't survive in this city while being viewed as 'successful'... I'm probably going to be part of this wave of silent emigration."

Following the 2023 death of Irish singer Sinéad O'Connor, a Muslim and feminist, Teeling designed an "Irish Princess" t-shirt in her honour with sales benefitting the Muslim Sisters of Éire which he cited as "an organisation that echoes her generosity, spirit, and determination".

== Works ==
- Taylor, Jennie; Teeling, Brian (2024). In the Glow of a Frozen Flame. Crawford Art Gallery. ISBN 978-1-3999-8435-5.
