= Patrick Joseph Carroll =

Irish police commissioner

7th Garda Commissioner
- In office March 1967 – September 1968
- Preceded by: William P. Quinn
- Succeeded by: Michael Wymes

Personal details
- Born: 15 September 1903 Stradbally, Laois, Ireland
- Died: 6 December 1975 (aged 72) Rathmines, Dublin, Ireland
- Education: Garda Síochána College

Patrick Joseph Carroll (15 September 1903 – 6 December 1975) was an Irish soldier and former commissioner of the Gardaí Síochána from March 1967 to September 1968.

== Life and career ==
Carroll was born 15 September 1903 in Ballyrider, Stradbally, County Laois. He was active in the Irish Republican Army during the Irish War of Independence in Athy, County Kildare. He was the Garda commissioner between March 1967 – September 1968. Carroll died on 6 December 1975 in Rathmines, County Dublin aged 72.
