= PULSE (computer system) =

Computer system used by the Garda Síochána

PULSE (contrived acronym for "Police Using Leading Systems Effectively") is a computer system used by the Garda Síochána, the police force of the Republic of Ireland. The system was introduced in November 1999.

The contract for the system was awarded to Andersen Consulting (now Accenture) and is managed by a directorate of three senior Gardaí and an Accenture consultant. The system is run by the PULSE Project teams of the IT section of the Garda Síochána.

The system cost €98.3 million originally and between 2001 and 2006 €12.88 million was spent on updating and maintaining it. The system is available in 519 of 565 Garda stations.

Under data protection legislation, it is possible to request personal data held on the system, unless that information would identify someone else or if disclosing the personal data is being held in order to prevent, investigate or detect crime or is being used for prosecuting or arresting offenders.

== Insurance investigation ==
In 2007 between 40 and 50 Gardaí were questioned as part of an internal inquiry into allegations that Gardaí had supplied confidential information to insurance companies in order to settle road traffic claims. The PULSE system was included in the investigation.

== Reliability ==
PULSE has been the subject of complaints by the Association of Garda Sergeants and Inspectors and the Garda Representative Association on grounds that it is unreliable and has caused backlogs in bringing cases to court. Kathleen O'Toole criticised the system for being difficult to use and not being user-friendly.

== See also ==
- Police National Computer, the equivalent system in the United Kingdom
- Prawo Jazdy (alleged criminal)
