= Noel Conroy =

17th Garda Commissioner
- In office 21 July 2003 – 26 November 2007
- Preceded by: Patrick Byrne
- Succeeded by: Fachtna Murphy

Personal details
- Born: 11 March 1947 (age 79) Erris, County Mayo, Ireland
- Education: Garda Síochána College; FBI Academy

Noel Conroy (born 11 March 1947) is a former Irish Garda who served as Garda Commissioner from 2003 to 2007.

He was born in Aughleam, Erris, County Mayo. He attended Aughleam N.S. and St. Nathy's College, Ballaghaderreen. He joined the Garda Síochána in 1963 and has had a distinguished career, serving at senior level in demanding sectors in the Gardaí.

He was awarded a Silver Scott Medal in 1981. Most of his career was in the detective branch and he was part of T squad in the 1980s in Dublin, when organised crime gangs of the day were targeted.

He is a graduate of the FBI Academy as well as FBI National Executive Institute. As Commissioner he was deeply involved with the Peace Process.

Police appointments
| Preceded by Patrick Byrne | Garda Commissioner; 2003–2007 | Succeeded by Fachtna Murphy |
