= Daniel Costigan =

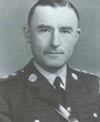

5th Garda Commissioner
- In office July 1952 – February 1965
- Preceded by: Michael Kinnane
- Succeeded by: William P. Quinn

Personal details
- Born: 1911
- Died: 1979 (aged 67–68)
- Children: 6

Daniel Costigan (1911–1979) was Commissioner of the Garda Síochána from July 1952 until February 1965. Costigan was the second, and final, civilian commissioner of the Garda Siochana.

== Personal life ==
He and his wife Hilda had three daughters and three boys. He was widowed in 1966.

== Visit by John F. Kennedy ==
Commissioner Costigan was involved in the security for the visit of then President John F. Kennedy to Ireland in 1963. Three death threats had been received and Commissioner Costigan warned his subordinates to not disregard the potential of any such threat, no matter how implausible the source. He regarded Kennedy's state visit as the most significant event in the country's history since independence.

== Criticism by Charles Haughey ==
In 1963, Minister for Justice Charles Haughey accused the Commissioner of "talking through his hat" after learning that only 15% of criminals were fingerprinted (petty criminals were not).

== Criticism by Murphy Report ==
The Murphy Report criticised Commissioner Costigan for his handling of allegations of child abuse by Fr. Edmondus (pseudonym). Scotland Yard had contacted him concerning images that the priest had sent to be developed in the UK. Commissioner Costigan asked Archbishop John Charles McQuaid to handle it because a priest was involved and he claimed "Gardaí could prove nothing".
