= Patrick Byrne (commissioner) =

Irish police commissioner (born 1946)

16th Garda Commissioner
- In office July 1996 – July 2003
- Preceded by: Patrick Culligan
- Succeeded by: Noel Conroy

Personal details
- Born: 1946 (age 79–80) Knocknagree, County Cork, Ireland
- Education: Garda Síochána College; FBI Academy

Patrick Byrne (born 1946) is an Irish police officer, who served as the commissioner of Garda Síochána between July 1996 and July 2003.

== Life and career ==
Byrne was born in 1946, in Knocknagree, County Cork, the son of a superintendent.

He retired from his role as the Gardai Commissioner in July 2003.

In 2012, he testified at the Smithwick Tribunal. to address allegations of corruption within the Gardai during the 1989 Jonesborough ambush.

Police appointments
Preceded by Patrick Culligan	Garda Commissioner; 1996–2003	Succeeded by Noel Conroy
