= Ivor Callely expenses scandal =

The Ivor Callely expenses scandal centred on the Fianna Fáil senator Ivor Callely. The scandal resulted in Callely's resignation from the Fianna Fáil party, as well as a jail sentence.

== Details of expenses ==
On 30 May 2010, it was revealed under a Freedom of Information Act request, that Callely had claimed expenses totalling €81,015 since 2007 for overnight and travel expenses to a house in County Cork. Callely said that following the loss of his Dáil seat in 2007, he took up residence in Cork. After his nomination to the Seanad, Callely informed Oireachtas officials in December 2007 that his "current principal residence" was Kilcrohane, Bantry in County Cork, which is 370 km from Leinster House.

The Irish Independent reported that he was still politically active in Dublin, ran a constituency office on the northside of Dublin and attended Fianna Fáil meetings locally. On 1 June 2010, the Taoiseach Brian Cowen requested a written explanation from Callely about his expense claims. Speaking in the Seanad on 2 June 2010, Callely insisted that he had fully complied with regulations. He said that he had always made it clear that he had a residence in west Cork, as well as a home in Clontarf and a constituency office in Dublin North–Central. He resigned as the Fianna Fáil party whip on 5 June 2010. He claimed a €140 "overnight" allowance on hundreds of occasions when attending the Seanad – even though he stayed in his Dublin home on the nights in question.

In July 2010, the Oireachtas Select Committee on Members' Interests investigated Callely's travel expenses. It found that he had breached a section of the 2001 Standards in Public Office Act, by misrepresenting his normal place of residence for the purpose of claiming allowances. As a result, he was suspended from the Seanad for 20 days without pay.

On 1 August 2010, the Irish Daily Mail revealed that in November 2007, Callely claimed €2,907 for mobile phone handsets and car kits purchased from a company called Business Communications Limited between 2002 and 2005. This company had ceased trading in 1994, eight years before Callely's earliest claim. The departments of which he was a minister between 2002 and 2005 paid €33,000 in phone bills for his constituency office, mobile and home phones, including the purchase of new phones.

== Suspension and resignation ==
On 3 August 2010 following the revelations in the Irish Daily Mail, Callely was suspended without prejudice from the Fianna Fáil party pending the outcome of an internal investigation.

On 23 August 2010, The Irish Times reported that a further complaint against Callely was received by the committee investigating his expenses claims, relating to his alleged failure to declare in his annual Oireachtas statement of interest all his property assets that are not for family use.

He resigned from the Fianna Fáil organisation on 24 August 2010. Senator Dan Boyle of the Green Party called on Callely to resign from the Seanad, saying that "the longer he serves as a Senator, the more discredit he brings on the Seanad."

== Legal challenge ==
Callely took a legal challenge to the Oireachtas committee that suspended him. It was heard in the High Court in October 2010. Lawyers for Callely told the court that the committee had portrayed him as 'a pariah' who had ripped off the State to the sum of €80,000, and as 'a chancer', 'a rogue', and 'thoroughly despicable'. He sought to overturn his suspension, to declare that the committee erred in law, and to halt further investigation against him and also financial damages. Several of his former Fianna Fáil colleagues, including Mary Hanafin, criticised him for dragging Oireachtas business into the courts. The High Court ruled in Callely's favour. It found his right to fair procedures and natural justice had been breached. Justice Iarfhlaith O'Neill issued formal orders quashing the decision of the committee and its resolution to suspend him. Callely was awarded €17,000 for loss of earnings during his 20-day suspension, as well as being awarded costs. Callely said he was delighted with the result which clearly vindicated his position.

The committee appealed the ruling to the Supreme Court, which voted 4–3 on 9 April 2014 to overturn the High Court ruling.

== Arrests and conviction ==
Callely was arrested on 25 January 2012 concerning allegations he had used forged receipts for mobile phone kits.

On 27 April 2012, Callely was fined €150 in court for driving without an NCT disc displayed.

In May 2012, the Irish Independent revealed that Callely was overpaid almost €6,000 in mileage expenses while he was a Minister of State in 2004–05. The error was discovered in 2010 but he has refused to pay back the money. Callely was asked by the Department of Transport to make proposals for repayment on a goodwill basis; he replied that due to the need to devote his energy to other proceedings he was not in a position to deal with this issue.

On 19 April 2013, Callely was arrested and taken to Clontarf Garda Station, where he was charged in connection with alleged fraud and theft offences. The charges were reported to relate to an ongoing investigation about the alleged use of false invoices to claim expenses for the purchase of mobile phones. Later that day he was charged with six counts of using fraudulent instruments in the Dublin Criminal Courts of Justice. He was granted bail on his own bond of €250. On 3 March 2014, Callely pleaded guilty to making false mobile phone expenses claims while he was a member of the Oireachtas. On 28 July 2014 he was sentenced to 5 months in prison. In passing the sentence, Judge Mary Ellen Ring ruled that Callely's position at the time was an aggravating factor and said that a prison term was demanded by the public interest. He served his sentence at Wheatfield Prison in Clondalkin, Dublin.
