= Dónall Ó Cualáin =

Acting Garda (Police) Commissioner in Ireland (2017-2018)

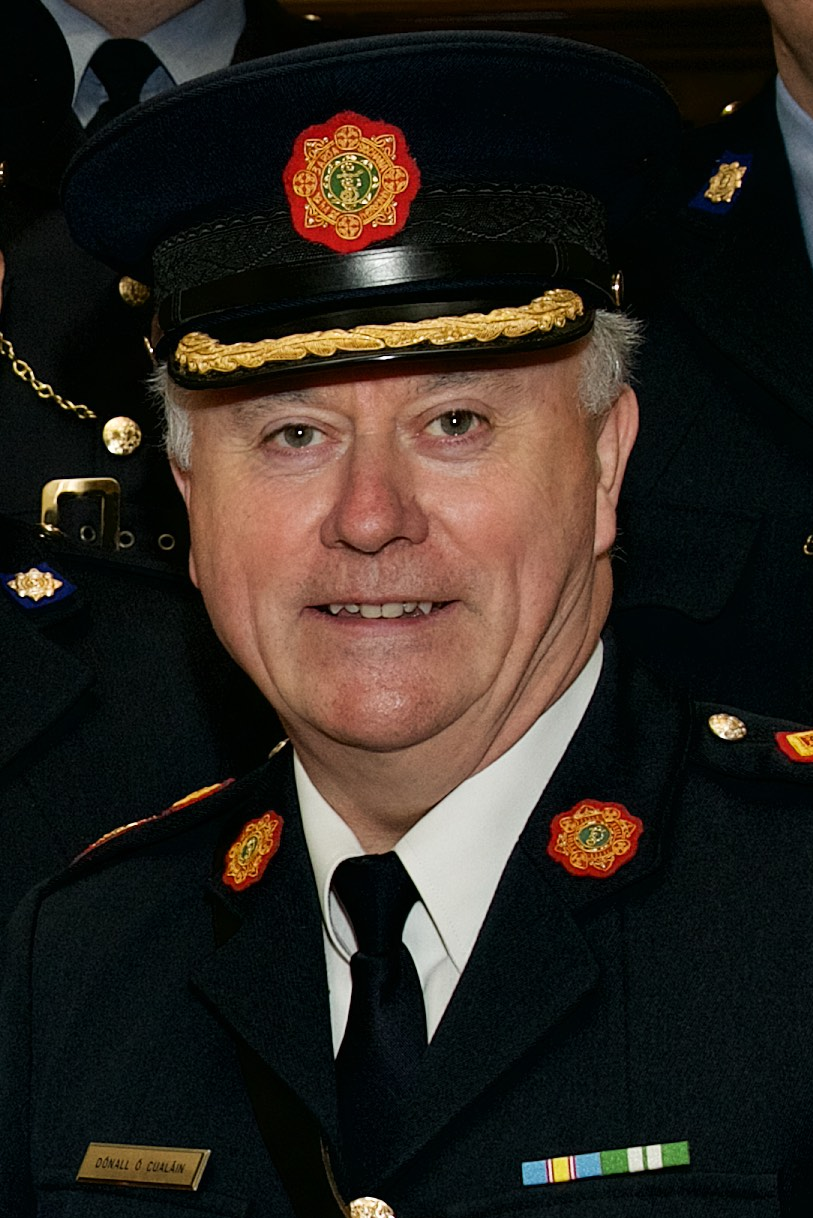
- Ó Cualáin in 2017

Garda Commissioner
- Acting
- In office 11 September 2017 – 3 September 2018
- Preceded by: Nóirín O'Sullivan
- Succeeded by: Drew Harris

Personal details
- Born: 4 November 1957 (age 68) Carna, County Galway, Ireland
- Education: Garda Síochána College

Dónall Ó Cualáin (born 4 November 1957) is a former Irish Garda who served as Acting Garda Commissioner from September 2017 to September 2018, after the resignation of Nóirín O'Sullivan.

== Biography ==
From Carna in the Gaeltacht area of Connemara, County Galway, Ó Cualáin is a fluent Irish speaker.

He was appointed Deputy Garda Commissioner and Head of Governance and Strategy on 20 October 2015. Following the resignation of Nóirín O'Sullivan, Ó Cualáin was appointed as Acting Garda Commissioner on 11 September 2017, by the Minister for Justice and Equality Charles Flanagan. PSNI Deputy Chief Constable Drew Harris was announced as the prospective 21st Garda Commissioner by the Government of Ireland on 26 June 2018. Ó Cualáin remained in place as Acting Commissioner until the official appointment of Harris on 3 September 2018, after which he retired.

Police appointments
Preceded by Nóirín O'Sullivan	Garda Commissioner; Acting; 2017–2018	Succeeded by Drew Harris
