= Rory MacCabe =

Irish judge

The Hon. Mr. Justice Rory MacCabe

Judge of the High Court
- Incumbent
- Assumed office 13 January 2022
- Nominated by: Government of Ireland
- Appointed by: Michael D. Higgins

Chairperson of the Garda Síochána Ombudsman Commission
- In office 18 January 2022 – 1 April 2025
- Nominated by: Government of Ireland
- Preceded by: Mary Ellen Ring

Judge of the Circuit Court
- In office 15 May 2007 – 13 January 2022
- Nominated by: Government of Ireland
- Appointed by: Mary McAleese

Personal details
- Education: King's Inns

Rory P. MacCabe is a retired Irish judge who was a judge of the High Court from January 2022 and the last chairperson of the Garda Síochána Ombudsman Commission, from January 2022 until it was replaced by Fiosrú on 2 April 2025. He was a judge of the Circuit Court between 2007 and 2022 and was formerly a barrister and civil servant.

== Early career ==
MacCabe first worked in the Irish civil service. He holds a diploma in public administration. He was called to the Bar in 1984 and became a senior counsel in 1999. He was involved in criminal trials and also acted in civil matters including employment law, defamation, personal injuries and injunctions. He acted for the builder Tom Brennan at the Mahon Tribunal.

David Andrews, as Minister for Foreign Affairs, employed MacCabe from 1998 to advise him on European affairs.

He was appointed to the Refugee Appeals Tribunal in August 2001.

== Judicial career ==
=== Circuit Court ===
He was appointed to the Circuit Court in May 2007. He was not assigned to a particular circuit. He presided over criminal trials involving drugs offences, robbery, sexual offences, assault, fraud, harassment, arson, and theft. He was presiding judge in cases involving debt recovery, defamation and health and safety law.

He was a member of the Sentencing Guidelines and Information Committee of the Judicial Council of Ireland and he was the chair of the Judicial ICT Cross Jurisdictional Committee.

He chaired a steering group of the Irish Sports Council in 2008.

=== High Court and GSOC ===
MacCabe was nominated to replace Mary Ellen Ring as the chairperson of the Garda Síochána Ombudsman Commission in December 2021. To facilitate his appointment, he was appointed to the High Court in January 2022. He also became the GSOC chairperson in January 2022.

He has since retired from the bench. As of April 2026 he was serving as the Member of the Single Person Committee of Inquiry.
