= Mary Ellen Ring =

Irish barrister, High Court judge since 2015

The Hon. Ms. Justice Mary Ellen Ring
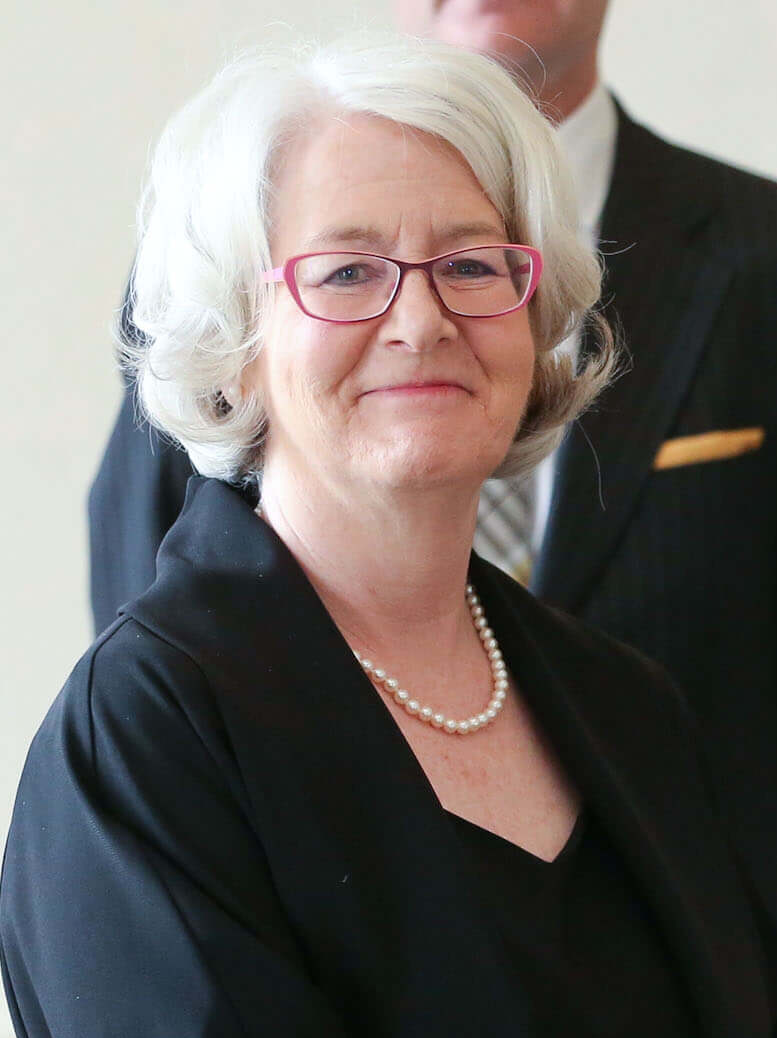
- Ring in 2015

Judge of the High Court
- Incumbent
- Assumed office 9 July 2015
- Nominated by: Government of Ireland
- Appointed by: Michael D. Higgins

Chairperson of the Garda Síochána Ombudsman Commission
- In office August 2015 – 11 December 2021
- Nominated by: Government of Ireland
- Preceded by: Simon O'Brien
- Succeeded by: Rory MacCabe

Judge of the Circuit Court
- In office 20 April 2012 – 9 July 2015
- Nominated by: Government of Ireland
- Appointed by: Michael D. Higgins

Personal details
- Born: 10 April 1955 (age 71) Norwich, Connecticut, U.S.
- Education: University College Dublin; Dublin Institute of Technology; King's Inns

Mary Ellen Ring (born 1955) is an American-Irish judge who has served as a Judge of the High Court since July 2015. She previously served as Chairperson of the Garda Síochána Ombudsman Commission from 2015 and 2021 and a Judge of the Circuit Court from 2012 to 2015.

== Early career ==
Ring was born in and grew up in Norwich, Connecticut in the United States with her Irish parents. She attended the Norwich Free Academy, graduating in 1973, before moving to Ireland. She studied Politics and Philosophy at University College Dublin and law at Dublin Institute of Technology. She studied at the King's Inns and became a barrister in 1985. She became a senior counsel in 2002. Her practice was primarily focused on criminal law, administrative law and child law. She was counsel for the Director of Public Prosecutions in the 2004 trial against Judge Brian Curtin for possession child pornography and in the 2010 case against Eamonn Lillis for the manslaughter of his wife Celine Cawley.

She was the chair of the Irish Women Lawyers' Association. The organisation awarded her the title of Woman of the Year in 2018. She co-founded the Children's Legal Centre and the Association for Criminal Justice Research and Development. She was appointed to the Advisory Group on Criminal Law and Procedure in 1996 by Minister for Justice Nora Owen.

== Judicial career ==
=== Circuit Court ===
Ring was appointed to the Circuit Court in April 2012. She was assigned to the Dublin circuit. She initially presided over Court Five, which was considered "by far the busiest circuit court in the country".

She was the trial judge in case which found Heather Perrin, a judge of the District Court, guilty of deception. She presided over the first trial of Seán FitzPatrick, related to an alleged failure to disclose loans to Anglo Irish Bank's external auditors at the Dublin Circuit Criminal Court. She sentenced former Senator Ivor Callely to five months in prison in 2014 arising out of his filing of fraudulent expenses.

=== High Court ===
She was appointed to the High Court in July 2015.

== GSOC ==
Ring became chairperson of the Garda Síochána Ombudsman Commission in August 2015. She was reappointed in 2016. She has been critical of the disciplinary procedures within the Garda Síochána. She has sought to increase the numbers of personnel within GSOC since her appointment. She was critical of the police force in May 2018 at a hearing of the Oireachtas Joint Committee on Justice and Equality for not disclosing some internal investigations into gardaí to GSOC.

Her term finished on 11 December 2021.
