= Drew Harris =

Former Commissioner of the Garda Síochána

Drew Harris OBE QPM
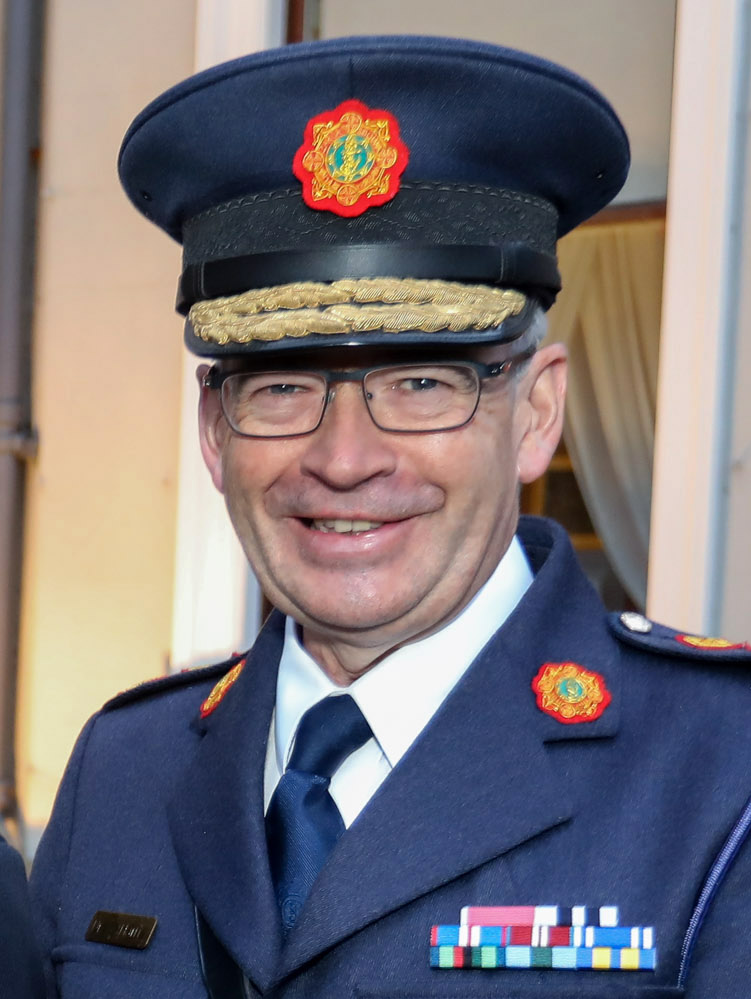
- Harris in 2024

21st Garda Commissioner
- In office 3 September 2018 – 1 September 2025
- Deputy: Anne Marie McMahon; Shawna Coxon
- Preceded by: Dónall Ó Cualáin (Acting)
- Succeeded by: Justin Kelly

Deputy Chief Constable of the Police Service of Northern Ireland
- In office 13 October 2014 – 3 September 2018
- Chief Constable: George Hamilton
- Preceded by: Judith Gillespie
- Succeeded by: Mark Hamilton

Personal details
- Born: Jeremy Andrew Harris; 5 April 1965 (age 61) Belfast, Northern Ireland
- Spouse: Jane Harris (m. 1988)
- Relations: Alwyn Harris (father)
- Children: 4
- Education: Open University; University of Cambridge

Jeremy Andrew Harris, OBE, QPM (born 5 April 1965) is a retired senior police officer who was the Commissioner of the Garda Síochána in the Republic of Ireland from September 2018 to September 2025. He previously served as Deputy Chief Constable of the Police Service of Northern Ireland (PSNI) from 2014 to 2018.

== Biography ==
Harris's father, senior RUC officer Alwyn Harris, was murdered by the Provisional IRA in 1989.

Harris joined the Royal Ulster Constabulary (RUC) in 1983, rising to become Deputy Chief Constable of the PSNI in October 2014.

Following an international selection process, which included a salary increase to €250,000 to attract greater interest, Harris was announced as the new Garda Commissioner on 26 June 2018, becoming the first Commissioner to be appointed from outside the Garda Síochána. He took over the leadership of the Garda Síochána from Dónall Ó Cualáin, who had served as acting Garda Commissioner since the resignation of Nóirín O'Sullivan in September 2017, following a number of Garda scandals. His appointment as Garda Commissioner was initially for five years, but was extended in February 2022 and April 2025.

In July 2023, the Garda Representative Association announced the rank and file of the Gardaí were holding a vote of no-confidence in Commissioner Harris over roster disputes. Harris stated that regardless the outcome of the vote, he would not be leaving the position. The vote was passed with 98.7% voting in favour of the motion and 1.3% against.

Harris retired as Garda Commissioner on 1 September 2025.

== Personal life ==
Harris is married with four children. He holds a bachelor's degree in Politics and Economics from the Open University along with a master's degree in Criminology from the University of Cambridge. He is a Protestant, specifically a Presbyterian. He holds both British and Irish citizenship.

In July 2024, a death threat was made against Harris in a video posted on TikTok by a man who said Harris would be getting "blasted before the end of the year". A 28-year-old man was later arrested.

== Honours ==
He was appointed an Officer of the Order of the British Empire (OBE) in 2010 and was awarded the Queen's Police Medal (QPM) in the 2019 Birthday Honours.

| Ribbon | Description | Notes |
| | Order of the British Empire (OBE) | Officer; Civil Division 2010 Birthday Honours List |
| | Queen's Police Medal (QPM) | 2019 Queen's Birthday Honours List |
| | Queen Elizabeth II Golden Jubilee Medal | 2002; UK Version of this Medal |
| | Queen Elizabeth II Diamond Jubilee Medal | 2012; UK Version of this Medal |
| | Police Long Service and Good Conduct Medal | |
| | Royal Ulster Constabulary Service Medal | |

Police appointments
| Preceded by Dónall Ó Cualáin (Acting) | Garda Commissioner; 2018–present | Incumbent |
