= Nóirín O'Sullivan =

20th Commissioner of An Garda Síochána

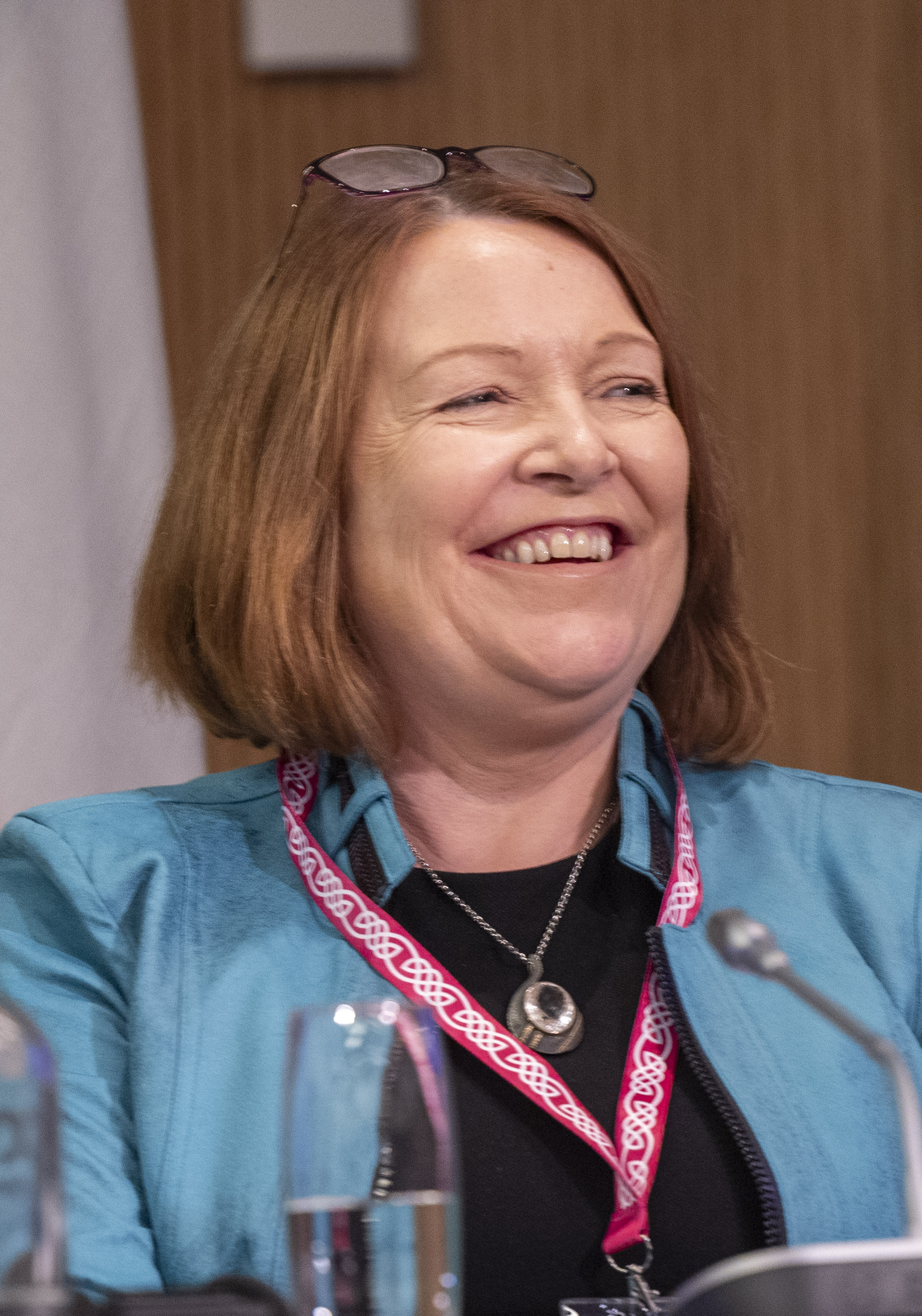
- O'Sullivan in 2023

Director of Strategic Partnerships for Europe at the International Association of Chiefs of Police
- Incumbent
- Assumed office 27 October 2017
- Preceded by: New office

20th Garda Commissioner
- In office 25 November 2014 – 11 September 2017
- Preceded by: Martin Callinan
- Succeeded by: Dónall Ó Cualáin (Acting)

Personal details
- Born: Nóirín O'Sullivan; 3 November 1960 (age 66) Dublin, Ireland
- Education: Garda Síochána College

Nóirín O'Sullivan (born 3 November 1960) is an Irish Garda who has served as Director of Strategic Partnerships for Europe at the International Association of Chiefs of Police since October 2017. She previously served as Garda Commissioner from 2014 to 2017. In October 2018, Nóirín was appointed UN Assistant Secretary-General for the Department of Safety and Security.

The first woman to lead the Gardaí in its 92-year history, O'Sullivan announced her retirement on 10 September 2017.

In late October 2017 she was appointed Director of Strategic Partnerships for Europe at the International Association of Chiefs of Police. In October 2018, O'Sullivan was appointed by Secretary-General of the UN as UN Assistant Secretary-General for Safety and Security.

== Garda career ==
O'Sullivan is from Dublin, and joined the Garda Síochána in 1981. She worked her way through the ranks of the Garda Síochána and during her 36 years of service, she held various managerial and leadership positions.

In 2000, she was promoted to superintendent and served in the Garda Síochána College with responsibility for specialist training. She also worked as a detective superintendent in the Garda National Drugs Unit (GNDU). In 2003, she was promoted to chief superintendent and served as detective chief superintendent at the Garda Technical Bureau and Human Resource Management.

O'Sullivan was promoted to assistant commissioner in 2007, and served in the Western Region, followed by Human Resource Management.

In June 2009, she was appointed assistant commissioner in charge of the Crime and Security Branch (CSB), with responsibility for Ireland's domestic state security and intelligence functions. In this role she had responsibility for specialist Garda units such as the Special Detective Unit, Emergency Response Unit and National Surveillance Unit.

She became Deputy Commissioner of Operations in 2011 and oversaw some of the most high profile VIP visits to the State. In March 2014, O’Sullivan was appointed interim commissioner and following an international competition, she was appointed on a permanent basis, by the government on 25 November 2014, becoming the first female commissioner to head the force since its foundation in 1922.

== Garda commissionership ==
O'Sullivan was appointed Garda Commissioner on an interim basis after the resignation of Martin Callinan on 25 March 2014. She formally took over the role of Commissioner on a permanent basis following her appointment by the Minister for Justice Frances Fitzgerald on 25 November 2014, becoming the first female Commissioner to head the force since its foundation in 1922.

A 2015 legal case accused O'Sullivan of "unfair competition" in her selection process for Deputy Commissioner. One question she was said to have asked an interviewee for the position was their opinion on "left wing political extremism in Ireland".

In 2015, O'Sullivan was awarded University College Dublin Alumnus of the Year for Business.

O'Sullivan was mentioned in the 2017 Prime Time special broadcast concerning the Garda whistleblower scandal, and her response to the Garda whistleblower scandal was included in the scope of inquiry for the first module of the Disclosures Tribunal.

In March 2017, it was announced that 14,700 people were wrongly convicted of motoring offences after they were not given the opportunity to pay a Fixed Charge Notice. Also, almost one million phantom breath tests were recorded on the Garda Pulse system, with figures claiming that 1,995,369 tests were carried out with only 1,061,381 actually taking place.

=== Resignation as commissioner ===
On 10 September 2017, O'Sullivan announced her decision to retire effective from midnight, stating that the "unending cycle of requests, questions, instructions and public hearings", which she described as "all part of a new – and necessary – system of public accountability", nevertheless left her with too little time to carry out such tasks as reforming the Garda Síochána "and meeting the obvious policing and security challenges". She informed Department of Justice secretary general Noel Waters, who spoke to Charles Flanagan, Minister for Justice, and Leo Varadkar, Taoiseach.

Upon her planned retirement, Minister for Justice Charles Flanagan announced he was appointing Deputy Commissioner Dónall Ó Cualáin as Acting Commissioner while he search for a permanent appointment "in the coming weeks". He also expressed his "sincere gratitude" to O'Sullivan for her 36 years of public service.

== Post-Garda commissionership ==
=== IACP ===
In late October 2017 the International Association of Chiefs of Police (IACP) announced that O'Sullivan had been nominated as the newly-created role of Director of Strategic Partnerships for Europe, to begin work later in 2017 and to be based in Ireland, the first time a member of the IACP's staff has been based outside the United States, as part of the IACP's aim to "further expand its global reach and representation".

=== UN ===
In October 2018, O'Sullivan was appointed as UN Assistant Secretary-General for Safety and Security.

=== Task Force on Safe Participation in Political Life ===
In May 2023, O'Sullivan was appointed by the Ceann Comhairle to chair a taskforce on safe participation in political life. The task force's first public report was launched in May 2024.

== Educational qualifications ==
- Honorary Doctorate of Laws, University of Ulster (2016)
- Graduate of the Federal Bureau of Investigation (FBI) National Executive Institute (NEI XXXIV) – Executive Leadership Programme designed for Chiefs of Police worldwide (2011)
- Advanced Management Diploma (1st Class Hons) – Michael Smurfit School of Business, University College Dublin (2007)
- Executive Education Programme – Driving Government Performance, John F. Kennedy School of Government, Harvard University (2007)
- Master of Business Studies (1st Class Hons), Michael Smurfit School of Business, University College Dublin (2006)
- Fellow of the Chartered Institute of Personnel and Development (CIPD)
- Certificate in Strategic HRM Development, Irish Management Institute (2005)
- Bachelor of Arts Degree (1st Class Hons) Police Management – awarded by HETAC and delivered by Garda College and University of Limerick
- Diploma in Addiction Studies, Trinity College Dublin (1992)

Police appointments
Preceded by Martin Callinan	Garda Commissioner; 2014–2017	Succeeded by Dónall Ó Cualáin (Acting)
