= Michael Kinnane =

Irish police commissioner

Joseph Michael Kinnane (18 January 1889 – 10 July 1952) was an Irish civil servant and commissioner of the Gardaí Síochána.

== Early life ==
Michael Joseph (M. J.) Kinnane was born on 18 January 1889 in Drumcondra, Dublin, the son of two national school teachers. He was raised in Mountbellew, County Galway, and educated at Blackrock College before studying law at the University of London, where he obtained an LLB. He entered the British civil service in 1908, working first in the War Office’s Exchequer and Audit department and later in the Revenue Department at Somerset House.

== Career ==
In 1913, Kinnane returned to Dublin as an estate duty officer in the Custom House, and in 1922 transferred to the civil service of the Irish Free State. He served in the Department of Home Affairs (Justice), becoming assistant secretary in 1928. In June 1938, he was appointed Garda Commissioner, succeeding Ned Broy, reportedly after considerable pressure to accept the role. He was the first civilian commissioner to hold the position.

As commissioner, he was regarded as an effective and reform-minded administrator. He introduced changes aimed at improving working conditions, including efforts to regularise garda working hours, relax residency rules, and establish negotiations on pay and welfare. He also began revising the outdated policing code inherited from the Royal Irish Constabulary. In 1944, he resisted proposals from Comhdháil Náisiúnta na Gaeilge to restrict recruitment to Irish speakers, although he permitted the translation of the garda drill book into Irish. During the period of the Second World War, he played a role in organising supplementary policing measures.

== Personal life ==
Kinnane was active in sport, particularly rugby and golf, and was a founder member and first secretary of Woodbrook Golf Club. He lived at Beaumont Lodge in Booterstown, Co. Dublin, with his wife Dorothy. He died on 10 July 1952 while still serving as commissioner, and was succeeded by Daniel Costigan.
