= Fachtna Murphy =

18th Garda Commissioner
- In office 21 November 2007 – 28 December 2010
- Preceded by: Noel Conroy
- Succeeded by: Martin Callinan

Personal details
- Born: 26 June 1947 (age 79) Timoleague, County Cork, Ireland
- Education: FBI Academy; College of Policing

Fachtna Murphy (born 26 June 1947) is a former Irish Garda who served as Garda Commissioner from 2007 to 2010.

Prior to his appointment he was the Deputy Commissioner with responsibility for operational policing strategies in the Garda Síochána. He grew up in Timoleague, County Cork. He joined the Garda Síochána in 1967 and holds a Bachelor of Arts (Hons) Degree in Police Management and a Diploma in Management and Industrial Relations, and has also studied policing methods overseas at both the FBI Academy, Quantico, Virginia, and at the Police College, Bramshill.

Police appointments
Preceded by Noel Conroy	Garda Commissioner; 2007–2010	Succeeded by Martin Callinan
