= Muslim Sisters of Éire =

Irish charity

Muslim Sisters of Éire is an Irish charity that supports homeless people. They hold a stall every Friday on O'Connell Street, the main street of Ireland's capital city Dublin, where they offer food, clothing, sleeping bags and hygiene kits to those in need. The charity also runs helplines for migrant and Muslim women, visits schools around Ireland to teach and talk about Islam, and provides court and family support.

== History ==
The charity was founded in 2010 by Lorraine O'Connor, a Dublin woman who had converted to Islam in 2005 with the help of Jasmina Kid, and at first worked out of Merchant's House Quay premises. MSOÉ moved to O'Connell Street in 2014, where they were met with some initial hostility. They aim to serve 350 meals a week. They paused the service during the first wave of the COVID-19 pandemic in the Republic of Ireland lockdown. In addition to the O'Connell Street operation, MSOÉ deliver food and hot drinks to people living in tents along the Grand Canal and those in direct provision. The soup run was suspended for the week of the 2023 Dublin riot due to fears of further racist violence.

== Aims and positions ==
In addition to supporting those in need of support on the street, another key aim of the organisation is to dispel stereotypes of Muslim women in Ireland as oppressed, but instead to increase the visibility of Muslim women as active members of society.

MSOÉ have criticised government requirements for soup runs to be operated by registered charities and approved by the HSE, as MSOÉ were.

== Recognition ==
The charity was named Local Food Hero at the 2024 Irish Restaurant Awards.
