= Ivor Callely =

Irish former politician (born 1958)

Senator
- In office 13 September 2007 – 25 May 2011
- Constituency: Nominated by the Taoiseach

Minister of State
- 2004–2005: Transport
- 2002–2004: Health and Children

Teachta Dála
- In office June 1989 – May 2007
- Constituency: Dublin North-Central

Personal details
- Born: 6 May 1958 (age 68) County Dublin, Ireland
- Party: Independent (2010–2011)
- Other political affiliations: Fianna Fáil
- Spouse: Jennifer Foley
- Children: 3

Ivor Callely (born 6 May 1958) is an Irish former politician who served as a Fianna Fáil Teachta Dála (TD) for the Dublin North-Central constituency from 1989 to 2007 and a member of Seanad Éireann from 2007 to 2011, having been nominated by the Taoiseach, Bertie Ahern. Between 2002 and 2005 he served as a Minister of State. He resigned from the Fianna Fáil party on 24 August 2010 due to an expenses scandal.

== Early life ==
Callely was born in Clontarf, Dublin and was educated at St Paul's College, Raheny.

== Politics ==
Callely first held political office in 1985 when he was elected to Dublin Corporation. He was an unsuccessful candidate at the 1987 general election but was elected to Dáil Éireann at the 1989 general election and held his seat at the three subsequent general elections.

In 1991 he became the youngest chairperson of the Eastern Health Board. Between 1993 and 1995 he served as Assistant Chief Whip in Fianna Fáil. From 1995 to 1997 he served as Fianna Fáil Policy Co-ordinator. At the 1997 general election he received the fifth highest vote in the country. This was followed up at the 1999 local elections when he received the highest vote in the country.

In 2002 Callely was appointed by the government of Bertie Ahern as Minister of State at the Department of Health and Children with special responsibility for services for older people. In a reshuffle in September 2004, he was appointed Minister of State at the Department of Transport with special responsibility for certain traffic management issues in Dublin and the major cities, road haulage and the Irish Aviation Authority. His announcements about railway projects attracted the nickname "Ivor the Engine".

On 8 December 2005, Callely resigned his ministerial post after an RTÉ News report that a building contractor involved in public contracts had painted his house for free in the early 1990s. It was also revealed that Callely had offered to personally buy a new car for one of his civil service advisers, in an attempt to persuade the adviser not to leave their job. Callely's department had an unusually high turnover of staff for some time under his stewardship.

Callely lost his seat at the 2007 general election and was also unsuccessful at the Seanad elections for the Industrial and Commercial Panel in 2007. He was subsequently appointed by the Taoiseach Bertie Ahern to the Seanad. He did not contest the 2011 general election or the 2011 Seanad election.

On 4 April 2011, Callely was fined €60 in court for using a mobile phone while driving.

== Complaint to Standards Commission ==
In 2005, the Standards in Public Office Commission received a complaint regarding an advertisement for the Operation Freeflow system which outlined traffic and travel arrangements in Dublin in the pre-Christmas period, and which featured a photograph of Callely, then Minister of State. The complainant was of the view that the Minister's appearance in the advertisement was a direct contravention of section 2.2.3 of the Code of Conduct for Office Holders as outlined above. The Standards Commission wrote to the complainant advising that they did not consider that the inclusion of a photograph of an office holder in an advertisement relating to a matter which encompassed his functions as an office holder was necessarily inappropriate. However, it also considered that the provisions of the code were insufficiently clear so as to distinguish between the appropriate use of a photograph of an office holder as part of a necessary advertising campaign and an inappropriate raising of profile in the context of a general election. The Standards Commission wrote to the Taoiseach and requested that the provisions of section 2.2.3 of the Code of Conduct for office holders be reviewed in order that office holders are provided with clear guidelines as to the circumstances in which public resources can be used in a way which avoids the inappropriate raising of profile in the context of a general election.

== Expenses scandal ==
On 30 May 2010, a Freedom of Information Act request revealed Callely had claimed expenses totalling €81,015 since 2007 for overnight and travel expenses to a house in County Cork. Callely said that following the loss of his Dáil seat in 2007, he took up residence in Cork. After his nomination to the Seanad, Callely informed Oireachtas officials in December 2007 that his "current principal residence" was Kilcrohane, Bantry in County Cork, which is 370 km from Leinster House. The Irish Independent reported that he was still politically active in Dublin, ran a constituency office on the northside of Dublin and attended Fianna Fáil meetings locally. Following pressure from the Taioseach Brian Cowen, Callely resigned the Fianna Fáil party whip on 5 June 2010. He claimed a €140 "overnight" allowance on hundreds of occasions when attending the Seanad – even though he stayed in his Dublin home on the nights in question.

Following further revelations about Callely's expenses in August 2010, he was suspended without prejudice from the Fianna Fáil party pending the outcome of an internal investigation. A further complaint against Callely followed later that month and he resigned from the Fianna Fáil organisation on 24 August.

== Arrests and conviction ==
Callely was arrested on 25 January 2012 concerning allegations he had used forged receipts for mobile phone kits. He was arrested again in April 2013, and taken to Clontarf Garda Station, where he was charged in connection with alleged fraud and theft offences. The charges were reported to relate to an ongoing investigation about the alleged use of false invoices to claim expenses for the purchase of mobile phones. Later that day he was charged with six counts of using fraudulent instruments in the Dublin Criminal Courts of Justice. In March 2014, Callely pleaded guilty to making false mobile phone expenses claims while a member of the Oireachtas, and was convicted in July 2014 and sentenced to 5 months in prison. In passing sentence, Judge Mary Ellen Ring ruled that Callely's position at the time was an aggravating factor and said that a prison term was demanded by the public interest. He served his sentence at Wheatfield Prison in Clondalkin, Dublin.

Separately, on 27 April 2012, Callely was fined €150 in court for driving without an NCT disc displayed.

In May 2012, the Irish Independent reported that Callely was overpaid almost €6,000 in mileage expenses while he was a Minister of State from 2004 to 2005. This error (separate to the invoice fraud) was discovered in 2010 but he had refused to pay back the money. When Callely was asked by the Department of Transport to make proposals for repayment on a goodwill basis, he replied that due to the need to devote his energy to other proceedings he was not in a position to deal with the issue at that time.

In May 2016 a bench order was again issued for Callely's arrest, when he failed to attend a court sitting relating to non-payment of a debt. It was subsequently reported on Tuesday 17 May that Callely had already made arrangements to pay this debt and therefore did not need to appear in court. This was explained as a breakdown in communication. It was reported on Wednesday 18 May however that this was not the case, that there was no breakdown of communication and that no arrangements had been made to pay the debt.

In July 2018, Callely was convicted of seven counts of criminal damage and one count of harassment against a GP practice in a property dispute. The offences, which involved the destruction of magazines and the smearing of tea bags on the walls of the doctor's office, were recorded on CCTV and were described as "very bizarre" by the presiding judge. Callely received a suspended sentence of eight months.

In October 2019, Callely and his estranged wife, Jennifer Foley, were sued by Everyday Finance DAC, a finance company, over an alleged €2.9 million in outstanding property loans. In March 2020, it was reported that Foley engaged and reached a settlement on her share of debt with the firm. Callely claimed that he was unable to deal with the case due to injuries sustained from a bicycle accident, and he subsequently was ordered to pay €1.5 million following a summary judgement in the company's favour.

Political offices
Preceded by Tom Moffatt	Minister of State at the Department of Health and Children; 2002–2004	Succeeded by Seán Power
Preceded by Jim McDaid	Minister of State at the Department of Transport; 2004–2005	Succeeded by Pat "the Cope" Gallagher

Dáil	Election	Deputy (Party)	Deputy (Party)	Deputy (Party)	Deputy (Party)
13th	1948	Vivion de Valera (FF)	Martin O'Sullivan (Lab)	Patrick McGilligan (FG)	3 seats 1948–1961
14th	1951	Vivion de Valera (FF)	Colm Gallagher (FF)	Patrick McGilligan (FG)	3 seats 1948–1961
15th	1954	Vivion de Valera (FF)	Maureen O'Carroll (Lab)	Patrick McGilligan (FG)	3 seats 1948–1961
16th	1957	Vivion de Valera (FF)	Colm Gallagher (FF)	Patrick McGilligan (FG)	3 seats 1948–1961
16th	1957 by-election	Vivion de Valera (FF)	Frank Sherwin (Ind.)	Patrick McGilligan (FG)	3 seats 1948–1961
17th	1961	Vivion de Valera (FF)	Frank Sherwin (Ind.)	Patrick McGilligan (FG)	Celia Lynch (FF)
18th	1965	Vivion de Valera (FF)	Michael O'Leary (Lab)	Luke Belton (FG)	Celia Lynch (FF)
19th	1969	George Colley (FF)	Michael O'Leary (Lab)	Luke Belton (FG)	Celia Lynch (FF)
20th	1973	George Colley (FF)	Michael O'Leary (Lab)	Luke Belton (FG)	Celia Lynch (FF)
21st	1977	Vincent Brady (FF)	Michael O'Leary (Lab)	Michael Keating (FG)	3 seats 1977–1981
22nd	1981	Vincent Brady (FF)	Charles Haughey (FF)	Noël Browne (SLP)	George Birmingham (FG)
23rd	1982 (Feb)	Vincent Brady (FF)	Charles Haughey (FF)	Richard Bruton (FG)	George Birmingham (FG)
24th	1982 (Nov)	Vincent Brady (FF)	Charles Haughey (FF)	Richard Bruton (FG)	George Birmingham (FG)
25th	1987	Vincent Brady (FF)	Charles Haughey (FF)	Richard Bruton (FG)	George Birmingham (FG)
26th	1989	Vincent Brady (FF)	Charles Haughey (FF)	Richard Bruton (FG)	Ivor Callely (FF)
27th	1992	Seán Haughey (FF)	Derek McDowell (Lab)	Richard Bruton (FG)	Ivor Callely (FF)
28th	1997	Seán Haughey (FF)	Derek McDowell (Lab)	Richard Bruton (FG)	Ivor Callely (FF)
29th	2002	Seán Haughey (FF)	Finian McGrath (Ind.)	Richard Bruton (FG)	Ivor Callely (FF)
30th	2007	Seán Haughey (FF)	Finian McGrath (Ind.)	Richard Bruton (FG)	3 seats from 2007
31st	2011	Aodhán Ó Ríordáin (Lab)	Finian McGrath (Ind.)	Richard Bruton (FG)	3 seats from 2007
32nd	2016	Constituency abolished. See Dublin Bay North			
