= Karolina Lewestam =

Polish philosopher and author (born 1979)

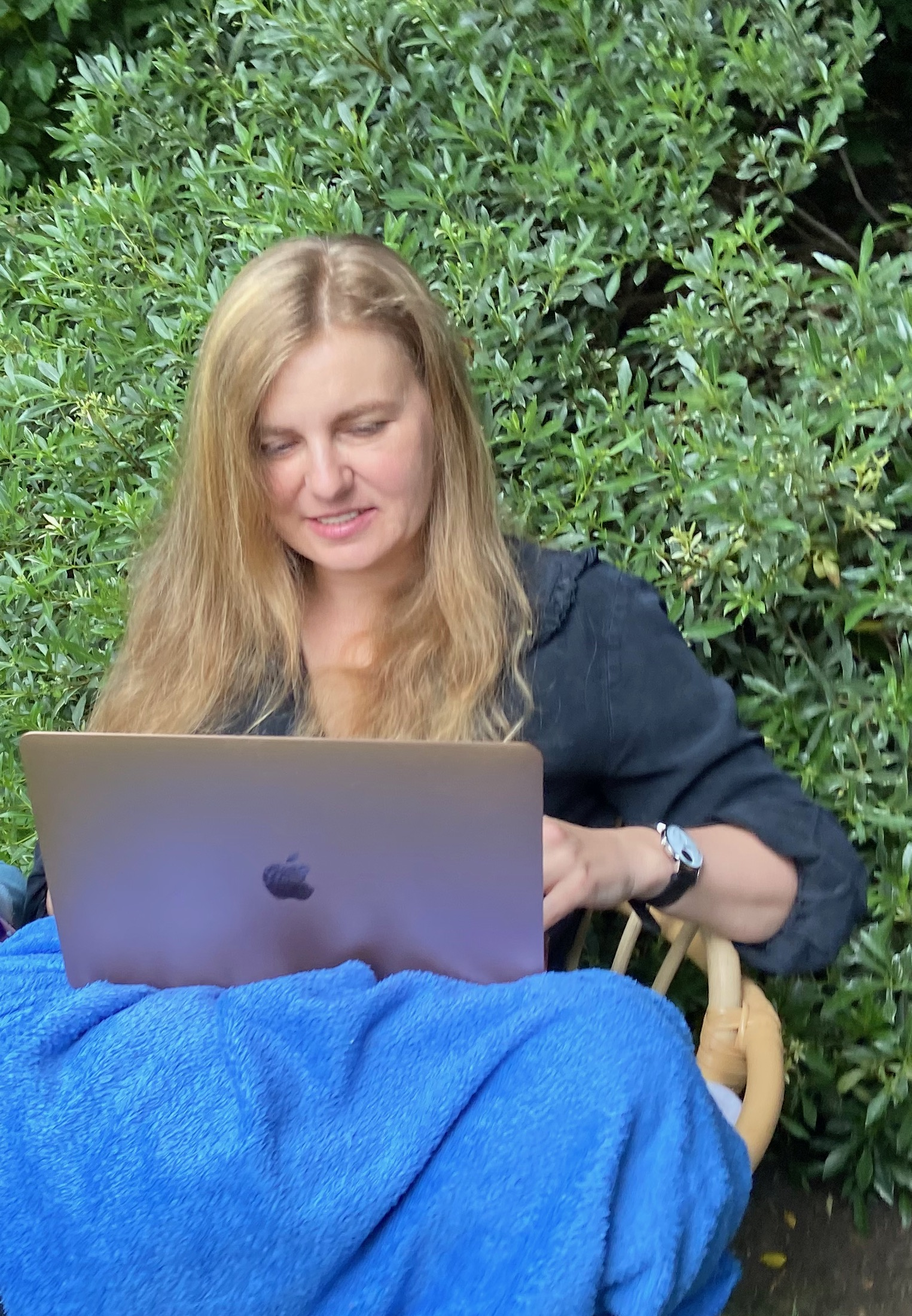
- Lewestam in 2020
- Born: October 20, 1979 (age 47)
- Occupations: publicist, philosopher, lecturer
- Children: 3

Academic background
- Education: University of Warsaw (B.A., M.A.); Boston University (PhD)
- Thesis: The Hare and the Tortoise: Problems with the Notion of Action in Ethics (2012)
- Doctoral advisor: Allen Speight

Academic work
- Discipline: Philosophy
- Website: lewestam.com

Karolina Aldona Lewestam (born October 20, 1979) is a Polish philosopher, children's book author, and member of the editorial board of the magazine Pismo.

== Education ==
Lewestam was born on October 20, 1979. She was an only child, and has described her early childhood as lonely. She became interested in reading from a young age.

Lewestam graduated from the University of Warsaw with a Bachelor's degree in sociology and a Master's degree in philosophy as part of the Interdisciplinary Individual Humanities Studies (1998–2004). She was a holder of the Minister of National Education scholarship three times. In 2002–2003 she studied at Bard College Berlin in Berlin, Germany. From 2006–2013 she studied at Boston University in Boston, Massachusetts, U.S. where in 2014 she defended her thesis, written under the supervision of Allen Speight, PhD in ethics, The Hare and the Tortoise: Problems with the Notion of Action in Ethics.

== Career ==
Lewestam worked as an assistant at the University of Warsaw (2004–2006) and at Boston University (2008–2011). She was a member of the Board of Trustees and a lecturer (2002–2004) at Collegium Invisibile. She taught at a secondary school in Warsaw in 2002.

She worked as a copywriter for 4fun.tv (2004), and for Telewizja Polska as editor of "The Summa of Events" (2004–2005), and at an advertising agency (2004–2006). She was also associated with PAFF and UW School of Education. She has published columns in the monthly publications Pismo, Dziennik Gazeta Prawna, and Gazeta Wyborcza.

She was awarded the Polish Academy of Sciences award for the best essay in 1997. She was nominated five times for the Grand Press award in the journalism category (2015, 2016 , 2017, 2018, 2020).

Her 2021 book, Mała księżniczka (The Little Princess), is a reinterpretation of the 1943 novella The Little Prince; changes include the introduction of a female protgonist and having Amelia Earhart be the book's narrator.

Her book, Dragon Shepherds, was awarded the EMPiK Discovery 2022.

Her 2023 novel Silla, and its 2024 sequel, Strażniczka perły, are fantasy novels set in the arctic. Lewestam received the 2024 Hestia Literary Journey Award for Silla.

== Personal life ==
Lewestam has three children. Following the onset of the Russian invasion of Ukraine in 2022, Lewestam and her husband hosted some displaced Ukrainians in their home. She is a feminist.

== Book publications ==
- Lewestam, Karolina (2009). Bajki o Kubuś. Katowice: Association of Publishing Initiatives: Upper Silesian Cultural Center. p. 46. ISBN 9788392185192.
- Czetwertyńska, Grażyna; Krawczyk, Magdalena; Lewestam, Karolina (2008). An idea for a classy school...: project guide. Warsaw: Centrum Edukacji Obywatelskiej. p. 124. ISBN 9788389623355.
- Lewestam, Karolina (2022). Dragon Shepherds: parents against the world (1st ed.). Wołowiec: Wydawnictwo Czarne. ISBN 978-83-8191-406-2. OCLC 1303139753.

=== Novels ===
- Lewestam, Karolina (2021). Mała księżniczka [The Little Princess]. Warsaw: W.A.B. ISBN 9788328092785.
- Silla. Warsaw: Wydawnictwo Agora. 2023. ISBN 978-83-268-4156-9.
- Strażniczka perły [Guardian of the Pearl].

==== Co-authored ====
- Lewestam, K.; Masłoń, A. (2023). Pamiętnik Magdy Kot [Magda Kot's Diary]. Warsaw: W.A.B. ISBN 9788328096851.
