= William P. Quinn =

Irish Garda commissioner (national police head)

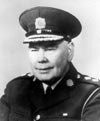

6th Garda Commissioner
- In office February 1965 – March 1967
- Preceded by: Daniel Costigan
- Succeeded by: Patrick Carroll

Personal details
- Born: 5 March 1900; Inniskeen, County Monaghan, Ireland
- Died: 10 January 1978
- Spouse: Helen Mary Walshe (m. 1928)
- Children: 8

William P. Quinn (5 March 1900 – 10 January 1978) was born in Inniskeen, County Monaghan, Ireland. He was the son of Thomas J. Quinn, the principal of the National School. He joined the Garda Síochána in December 1922 and was the first recruit to rise through the ranks to the office of Commissioner.

== Biography ==
He was educated at the Christian Brothers school in Dundalk. He joined the Ulster Bank in September 1916, leaving in 1918 to become a volunteer in the Irish Republican Army (IRA). He worked with O'Rourke's Mill and served with the Inniskeen company of the IRA. He was interned by the British in Ballykinlar, County Down in 1921. He served in the Gardaí from 1922 to 1967. He married Helen Mary Walshe in June 1928 and they had five daughters and three sons. One of his sons, James Aiden O'Brien Quinn, was a judge in several Commonwealth countries.

After his retirement, he managed Bray Credit Union. He is buried in Bray, County Wicklow. He was the uncle of the engineer Peter Rice.

== Career ==
His registration number was 2712 indicating that he was recruited in late November 1922. His early career was spent in the Waterford Division and he was promoted to Sergeant on the first of December 1922. He served as clerk to the Chief Superintendent, Waterford Division, and on the first of September 1925, was promoted to the rank of Inspector.

On 26 March 1927, he was promoted to Superintendent. He served in Cahirciveen (County Kerry), Bruff (County Limerick), and in County Wexford. On the first of June 1934, he was promoted to Chief Superintendent and took charge of the Tipperary Division, with its headquarters in Thurles. His lifelong friendship with Dan Breen began here. In 1937 he became Divisional Officer of the Dublin/Wicklow Division.

In 1959 he was promoted to the rank of Assistant Commissioner at Dublin Castle, taking charge of the Dublin Metropolitan Division (DMD). On appointment as Deputy Commissioner (1962) he was given responsibility for Crime Branch, Garda H.Q. In February 1965 he was appointed Commissioner to succeed Daniel Costigan. He introduced one-way traffic on Dublin streets in 1966. He retired on 4 March 1967. He was the first Commissioner to rise through the ranks, a precedent followed by all subsequent Commissioners.

On 25 September 1968, he was appointed a member of the Conroy Commission – established to report on conditions of service of members of the Garda Síochána.
