= Garda Commissioner =

Head of the Garda Síochána

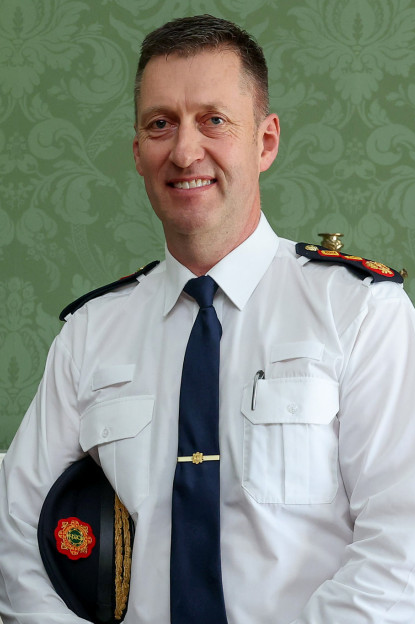
- Incumbent; Justin Kelly since 1 September 2025
- Member of: National Security Committee
- Reports to: Minister for Justice, Home Affairs and Migration
- Nominator: Minister for Justice
- Appointer: Government of Ireland
- Term length: 5 years
- Formation: February 1922
- Deputy: Deputy Commissioner Operations
- Salary: €314,512

Garda Commissioner epaulette

The Garda Commissioner (Irish: Coimisinéir na nGardaí) – officially known as the Commissioner of An Garda Síochána (Irish: Coimisinéir an Gharda Síochána) – is the head of the Garda Síochána, the national police force of Ireland. The Garda Commissioner is appointed by the Government of Ireland (Cabinet), on the recommendation of the Minister for Justice, Home Affairs and Migration. The Commissioner reports to the Minister for Justice, in charge of the Department of Justice, Home Affairs and Migration, of which the Garda Síochána is a state agency. The Garda Commissioner sits on the Irish Government's National Security Committee (NSC), and is responsible for Ireland's domestic state security apparatus.

The current Garda Commissioner is Justin Kelly, as of 1 September 2025.

== History ==
The Garda Síochána will succeed not by force of arms or numbers, but on their moral authority as servants of the people.

— Inaugural Garda Commissioner Michael Staines, 1922

Michael Staines became the first Garda Commissioner in February 1922, when the force was founded as the Civic Guard.

Traditionally, the Commissioner is the highest-ranking police officer in the state, however the selection process for the position is now open to candidates from outside the force, outside a law enforcement agency and outside of Ireland.

Nóirín O'Sullivan became the first woman to lead the force on her appointment in November 2014, having served as the acting Garda Commissioner from March 2014.

Drew Harris became the first Commissioner to be selected from outside An Garda Síochána in June 2018, having served as Deputy Chief Constable of the Police Service of Northern Ireland since October 2014.

== Office of the Garda Commissioner ==
The Garda Commissioner sits at Garda Headquarters, Phoenix Park, Dublin 8 and is supported by a senior management team generally consisting of two Deputy Commissioners, eight Assistant Commissioners and a Chief Administrative Officer. In addition to the senior management team, there are a number of executive directors leading supporting functions, along with a director of communications and the force's chief medical officer.

- Deputy Commissioner Policing & Security
- Deputy Commissioner Governance & Strategy
- Chief Administrative Officer
- Assistant Commissioner Crime and Security Intelligence Service
- Assistant Commissioner Organised & Serious Crime
- Assistant Commissioner Roads Policing & Community Engagement
- Assistant Commissioner Governance and Accountability
- Assistant Commissioner Dublin Metropolitan Region (DMR)
- Assistant Commissioner Eastern Region
- Assistant Commissioner North Western Region
- Assistant Commissioner Southern Region
- Executive Director Chief Information Officer
- Executive Director of Finance and Services
- Executive Director Human Resources and People Development
- Executive Director Legal and Compliance
- Executive Director Strategy and Transformation
- Executive Director Executive Support & Corporate Services
- Director of Communications
- Garda Chief Medical Officer

== List of Garda Commissioners ==
Name	Term of office		Notes / reason for departure
Michael Staines	February 1922	September 1922	resigned following Civic Guard Mutiny
Patrick Brennan	May 1922	September 1922	(unofficial – elected by mutineers during Civic Guard Mutiny)
Eoin O'Duffy	September 1922	February 1933	dismissed for encouraging a military coup
Eamon Broy	February 1933	June 1938	retired
Michael Kinnane	June 1938	July 1952	died
Daniel Costigan	July 1952	February 1965	resigned
William P. Quinn	February 1965	March 1967	retired
Patrick Carroll	March 1967	September 1968	retired
Michael Wymes	September 1968	January 1973	retired
Patrick Malone	January 1973	September 1975	retired
Edmund Garvey	September 1975	January 1978	replaced (lost government confidence)
Patrick McLaughlin	January 1978	January 1983	retired (wiretap scandal)
Lawrence Wren	February 1983	November 1987	retired
Eamonn Doherty	November 1987	December 1988	retired
Eugene Crowley	December 1988	January 1991	retired
Patrick Culligan	January 1991	July 1996	retired
Patrick Byrne	July 1996	July 2003	retired
Noel Conroy	July 2003	November 2007	retired
Fachtna Murphy	November 2007	December 2010	retired
Martin Callinan	December 2010	March 2014	resigned (penalty points & GSOC bugging scandal)
Nóirín O'Sullivan	March 2014 (acting); November 2014 (permanent)	September 2017	retired (whistleblower scandal & breath test scandal)
Dónall Ó Cualáin	September 2017 (acting)	September 2018	end of Acting Commissioner period / retired
Drew Harris	September 2018	September 2025	completed term (with extensions)
Justin Kelly	September 2025	Incumbent	

== See also ==
- Chief of Staff of the Defence Forces (Ireland)
