= Association of Garda Sergeants and Inspectors =

Representative body for middle rank police officers in Ireland

Association of Garda Sergeants and Inspectors (AGSI)
- Cumann Sairsintí agus Cigirí de'n Gharda Síochána
- Founded: 1978
- Headquarters: Phibsboro Tower, Phibsboro
- Location: Ireland
- Key people: Declan Higgins (President); Ronan Clogher (General Secretary)
- Website: agsi.ie

The Association of Garda Sergeants and Inspectors (AGSI; Irish: Cumann Sairsintí agus Cigirí de'n Gharda Síochána) is the statutory staff association for Gardaí (police officers) of the ranks of Sergeant, Station Sergeant and Inspector in Ireland. Irish law prohibits members of the Garda Siochana from joining trade unions because of a view from Government that police industrial action would pose a risk to public safety. The AGSI is a 1978 reconstitution of a Representative Body for Inspectors, Station Sergeants and Sergeants (RBISS) set up under 1962 regulations. Three similar organisations exist for Gardai of other ranks up to that of Chief Superintendent. As of September 2023, the association had a membership of around 2,500. It is funded by a levy on its members. All Garda members of the appropriate ranks may apply to join.

== History ==
=== The JGRB and the Representative Body for Sergeants and Inspectors ===
From 1927 to 1962, Garda members were represented for limited purposes by a Joint Garda Representative Body (JGRB); this body was criticised as dominated by senior officers and unable to secure needed changes in conditions of work. After a major and unauthorised meeting of hundreds of rank-and-file Gardaí at the Macushla Ballroom in Dublin, a chain of events led to the establishment by the Minister for Justice, Charles Haughey, of three new representative bodies, divided by rank, including the Representative Body for Inspectors, Station Sergeants and Sergeants (RBISS). That body was permitted to appoint a sergeant, on secondment, as its part-time general secretary. It was also permitted to apply to the Garda Commissioner for permission to request a subscription from members. The three bodies could, and were required to if requested by the Garda Commissioner, form a temporary joint representative body. There was cooperation at other levels too, with the magazine The Garda Review being issued by the GRA and AGSI together.

=== The 1978 reconstitution ===
Following a number of episodes, the three 1962 representative bodies were replaced by four new associations in 1978, including the AGSI. The association moved quickly to place a pay claim, and has remained very active since. Its first general secretary was the secretary of the preceding body, Derek Nally, a sergeant from County Wexford, who was succeeded in 1983 by P.J. Rogan for a year.

In 2021, two members of the National Executive raised questions about the accuracy of the AGSI accounts, and they, and then two more, resigned, and the organisation's trustees raised a formal query in their annual report. Although members of the NEC are elected from branches, the resignations were described as "human resources matters" by the AGSI president, as the association's leadership promoted constitutional changes. The accounts were signed off by the AGSI's auditors, and annual delegate conference.

In 2023, during disputes with the Garda authorities over rosters for front-line Gardai, the AGSI declined to join the Garda Representative Association in their action.
