= Garda Representative Association =

Representative body for ordinary police officers in Ireland

- Cumann Ionadaíochta an Gharda Síochána
- Founded: 1978
- Headquarters: Phibsboro Tower, Phibsboro
- Location: Ireland
- Key people: Mark O Meara (President); Niall Hodgins (Vice-President); Ronan Slevin (General Secretary)

The Garda Representative Association (GRA; Irish: Cumann Ionadaíochta an Gharda Síochána) is the staff association for police officers of the rank of Garda (equivalent to "Constable" or "Officer" in the Republic of Ireland, founded under statutory provisions. Irish law prohibits members of the Garda Siochana from joining trade unions because of a view from Government that police industrial action would pose a risk to public safety. The GRA is a 1978 reconstitution of a Representative Body for Guards (RBG) set up under 1962 regulations. Three similar organisations exist for Gardai of other ranks up to that of Chief Superintendent. As of March 2023, the association had a membership of almost 12,000. It is funded by a levy of 0.6% of the base salary of all its members.

== History ==
=== The JGRB and the Representative Body for Guards ===
From 1927 to 1962, Garda members were represented for limited purposes by a Joint Garda Representative Body (JGRB); this body was criticised as dominated by senior officers and unable to secure needed changes in conditions of work. After a major and unauthorised meeting of hundreds of rank-and-file Gardaí at the Macushla Ballroom in Dublin, a chain of events led to the establishment by the Minister for Justice, Charles Haughey, of three new representative bodies, divided by rank, including the Representative Body for Guards (RBG). The new organisation was permitted to appoint a Garda, on secondment, as its full-time general secretary, the first such appointment, in June 1962, being of Jack Marrinan. It was also permitted to form an executive committee of three, and to apply to the Garda Commissioner for permission to request a subscription from members. The three bodies could, and were required to if requested by the Garda Commissioner, form a temporary joint representative body.

=== 1978 reconstitution - the GRA ===
Following a number of episodes, the three 1962 representative bodies were replaced by four new associations, including the Garda Representative Association. Unlike the previous body, the GRA is constituted as an independent unincorporated association, albeit it is required to comply with the provisions of the establishing regulations. The new association began with 26 divisions and 110 districts, and a much-expanded structure of delegates to the central committee. It held its first annual general meeting in May 1979, and in addition to annual delegate conferences thereafter, it sometimes convened special conferences, such as one of policing reform in May 1983. 1988 saw the first female delegate to the annual conference of the association, which also received a report on a challenge by Garda detectives to the GRA's exclusive right of representation, lost in court; this later led to the formation of a breakaway Garda Federation. After the Federation merged back into the GRA in 1997, the association took a strong line in negotiations with Garda management, culminating, in May 1998, in a coordinated "blue flu" campaign. This involved Garda members making themselves unavailable for duty by calling in sick en masse, and was described by one national newspaper as "“the first major industrial action in the force's 75 year history."

In July 2023, the GRA announced that rank-and-file Gardaí would be balloted on a motion of no-confidence in the Garda Commissioner over roster disputes. Commissioner Drew Harris stated that regardless of the outcome of the vote, he would not be leaving his position. The vote was passed with 98.7% voting in favour and 1.3% against.
