= Communications & Information Services Corps =

Communications and Information Services Corps
- Irish: An Cór Seirbhísí Cumarsáide agus Eolais
- Badge of the CIS Corps
- Country: Ireland
- Branch: Army; Naval Service; Air Corps
- Type: Military communications
- Role: Installation, maintenance and operation of telecommunications and ICT systems Signals intelligence Cybersecurity
- Size: Battalion (minus) strength
- Part of: Defence Forces
- Garrison/HQ: McKee Barracks, Dublin
- Website: www.military.ie/en/who-we-are/army/army-corps/cis-corps/

Insignia
- Collar badge
- Abbreviation: CIS
- Flag

The Communications and Information Services Corps (CIS) (Irish: An Cór Seirbhísí Cumarsáide agus Eolais) – formerly the Army Corps of Signals – is one of the combat support corps of the Irish Defence Forces, the military of Ireland. It is responsible for the installation, maintenance and operation of communications and information systems for the command, control and administration of the Defence Forces, and the facilitation of accurate, real-time sharing of intelligence between the Army, Naval Service and Air Corps branches at home and overseas.

The CIS Corps is headquartered at McKee Barracks, Dublin, and comes under the command of an officer of Colonel rank, known as the Director of CIS Corps.

== Mission ==
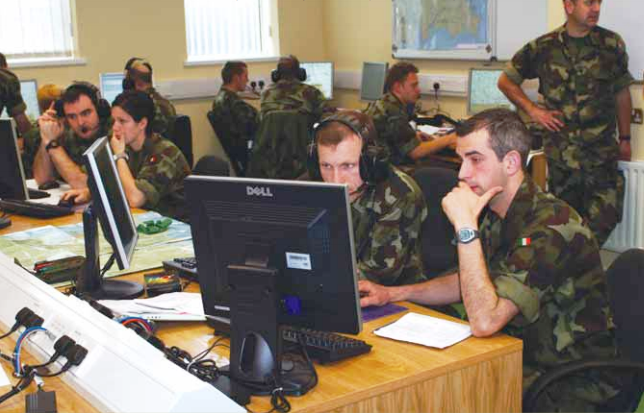
Members of the Defence Forces CIS at the Curragh Camp, County Kildare

Formerly the Army Corps of Signals, the Communications and Information Services Corps is responsible for the development and operation of Information Technology and Telecommunications systems in support of Defence Forces tasks. It is also responsible for coordinating communications – radio and line – and information systems, communications research and updating of communications in line with modern developments and operational requirements. The CIS Corps is tasked with utilising networking and information technologies in order to increase Defence Force operational effectiveness through the provision of timely and accurate information to the appropriate commander, along with the real time sharing of information and intelligence with the Army, Naval Service and Air Corps, as well as with multinational partners involved in international peacekeeping and other actors as required.

This role includes the development and maintenance of a secure nationwide Defence Forces Telecommunications Network (DFTN), which can support both protected voice and data services, and the provision and maintenance of encrypted military communications equipment for use by Defence Forces personnel at home and abroad. CIS Corps units are dispersed throughout the DF giving Communications and IT support to each of the Army Brigades; Naval Service, Air Corps, Defence Forces Training Centre (DFTC) and Defence Forces Headquarters (DFHQ). The CIS Corps have Base Workshops where detailed maintenance, research and development is conducted.

The CIS Corps collar flash features the angel Gabriel, the messenger of God, behind a signal shield and the caption "Cór Comharthaíochta". This is the Irish translation for 'Signals Corps', while the translation for Communications and Information Services Corps is "An Cór Seirbhísí Cumarsáide agus Eolais".

== Signals intelligence & cyber ==
The Communications and Information Services (CIS) Corps works with the Irish Military Intelligence Service (IMIS), with regard to signals intelligence (SIGINT), and houses a dedicated SIGINT element within the Corps. The DF CIS Corps has the ability to intercept and monitor communications, remotely collect data, and process it. Under Irish legislation, the Criminal Justice (Surveillance) Act 2009 and Interception of Postal Packets and Telecommunications Messages (Regulation) Act 1993 provides the Defence Forces with the legal authority to conduct domestic intelligence operations involving espionage, electronic communications and stored electronic information in order to safeguard and maintain the security of the state.

The CIS Corps along with the Garda Síochána, the national police force, provide a significant domestic support role to the National Cyber Security Centre (NCSC) of the Department of Justice, Home Affairs and Migration (formerly of the Department of Communications, Climate Action and Environment) in countering cyber-attacks, protecting critical national infrastructure and securing government communications. CIS is responsible for cyber security within the Defence Forces, and maintains a capability in that area for the purpose of protecting its own networks and users domestic and foreign. In 2016 the establishment of the Computer Incident Response Team (CIRT) in DFHQ CIS Company was revealed.

In July 2015, leaked email correspondence from Hacking Team – a private Italian spying and eavesdropping software company – reportedly showed members of the Irish CIS Corps in discussions with the company to purchase intrusion and surveillance "solutions" for the lawful interception of online communications, such as monitoring incoming and outgoing emails, browsing activity, Skype calls, remotely switching on webcams and microphones and remotely taking control of devices. A Defence Forces spokesperson said that for operational security reasons, it could not comment on specific elements of the activities of the CIS Corps, but confirmed that no goods or services were purchased from the company in question.

The CIS Corps deployed 'ethical hackers' to fight back against the Health Service Executive ransomware attack in mid-2021, and sent CIS personnel to hospitals and HSE offices in order to decrypt devices affected by the cyberattack onsite. Reservists were particularly useful to this effort due to their cybersecurity skills and experience gleaned from the private sector.

== CIS School ==
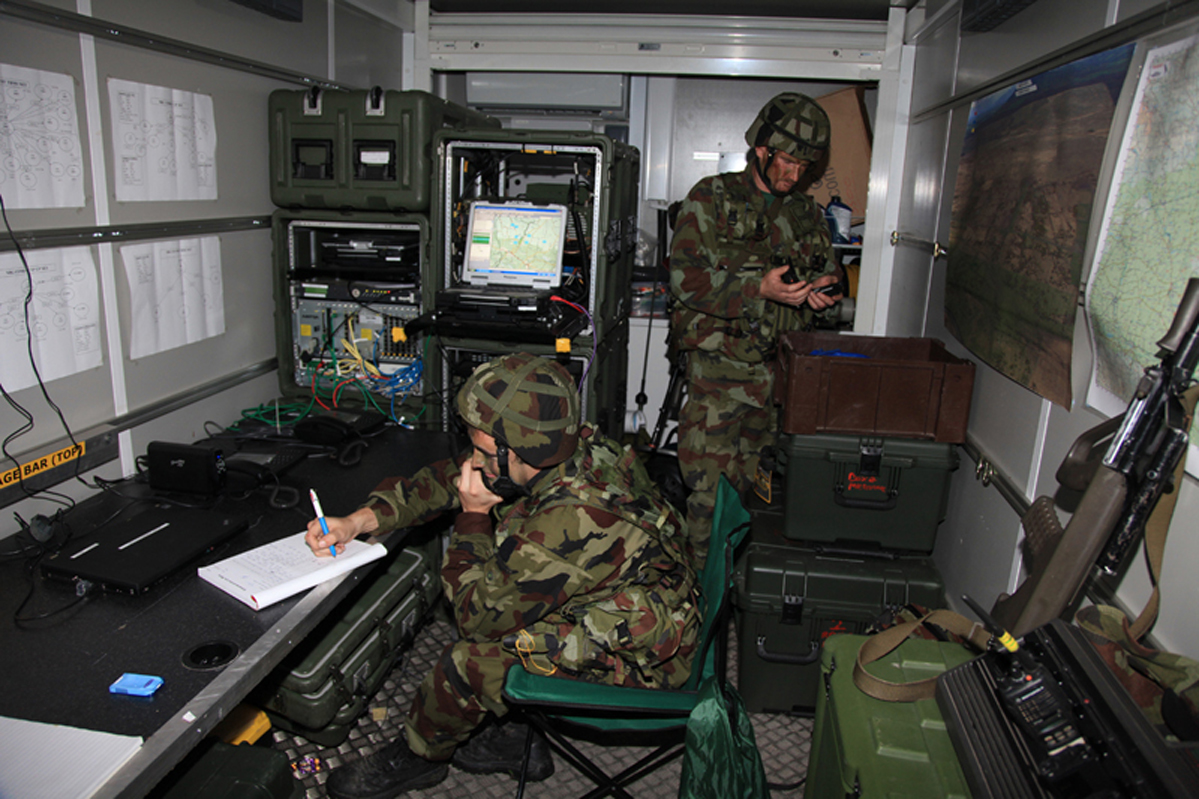
Irish Army CIS on ISTAR training as part of the EU CSDP Nordic Battlegroup

Soldiers join the Communications and Information Services Corps in one of the following apprenticeship trades;

- Communication Operative
- Electronic Engineering Technician
- Software Engineering Technician
- Information Technology Support Technician
- Communications & Information Services Technician
- Regimental Signaller
- Radio Instructor
- Telephone Maintenance Technician
- Data Communications Technician
- Microwave Systems Technician
- Network Administrator

All personnel do their basic military training.

The CIS School runs a large number of CIS related courses, including a degree programme in Military Communications for CIS technicians in association with the Institute of Technology, Carlow.

There are 3 sections to the CIS School, providing training in the areas of operational procedures, technical proficiency and simulation.

Procedural and Operations Section (Proc/Ops);

- Communications Operative Course
- Detachment Commanders Course
- Aerial Riggers Course
- Regimental Signals Course
- CIS Standard NCO Course
- CIS Young Officers Course

Technical Section;

- CIS Trainee Technician Scheme (TTS)
- Technical Training Advancement Courses
- Strategic Applications Training

Simulation Section;

- Digital Indoor Range Theatres (DIRT)
- Command and Staff Trainer

The DIRT range is a digital indoor shooting range in which trainees can be assessed on their marksmanship skills for the various small arms weapons used by the DF. It helps develop these proficiencies methodically without firing live ammunition on a regular basis. The €1 million facility is based at the Department of Defence properties at Kilworth Camp, County Cork.

== Communications and Information Services Corps Units ==
=== Active units ===
- Defence Forces Headquarters CIS Company (DFHQ CIS Coy), McKee Barracks, Dublin
- Communications Division, Naval Service (Comms Div, NS), Halbouline, Cork
- Air Corps CIS Squadron, Casement Aerodrome, Baldonnel, County Dublin
- CIS Group (including CIS School, Base Signal Workshops, Base Technical Stores) Curragh Camp, Kildare
- 1 Field CIS Company (1 Fd CIS Coy), Collins Barracks, Cork
- 2 Field CIS Company (2 Fd CIS Coy), Cathal Brugha Barracks, Dublin

=== Retired units ===
- 4 Field CIS Company (4 FD CIS COY), Custume Barracks, Athlone
- 31 Reserve Field CIS Company (31 RES FD CIS COY), Sarsfield Barracks, Limerick and Collins Barracks, Cork
- 54 Reserve Field CIS Company (54 RES FD CIS COY), Custume Barracks, Athlone and Military Post, Sligo
- 62 Reserve Field CIS Company (62 RES FD CIS COY), Cathal Brugha Barracks, Dublin

The Reserve Defence Forces (RDF) units have been integrated with the Permanent Defence Forces (PDF) units as part of the "single force concept".

== See also ==
- Signals intelligence by alliances, nations and industries
- National Cyber Security Centre (NCSC)
- Irish Military Intelligence Service (IMIS)
- Army Ranger Wing (ARW)
- Garda Crime & Security Branch (CSB)
- Garda National Surveillance Unit (NSU)
- Centre for Cybersecurity & Cybercrime Investigation (UCD CCI)
- Royal Corps of Signals
