= Infantry Corps (Ireland) =

Largest component of the Irish Army responsible for infantry

Irish Army Infantry Corps
- Irish: An Cór Coisithe
- Flag of the Irish Army Infantry Corps
- Active: 1 October 1924 – present
- Country: Ireland
- Branch: Army
- Type: Light Infantry
- Role: Multiple roles
- Size: 7 Battalions, 1 Independent Company; 1 Infantry Battalion - Galway; 3 Infantry Battalion - Kilkenny; 6 Infantry Battalion - Athlone; 7 Infantry Battalion - Dublin; 12 Infantry Battalion - Limerick; 27 Infantry Battalion - Dundalk; 28 Infantry Battalion - Ballyshannon; 1 Mechanised Infantry Company, DFTC - Curragh
- Part of: Defence Forces
- Website: www.military.ie/en/who-we-are/army/army-corps/infatnry-corps/
- Abbreviation: INF

The Infantry Corps (INF) (Irish: An Cór Coisithe) is the largest component of the Irish Army. Infantry soldiers are regarded as operational troops who must be prepared for tactical deployment in any location at short notice. In wartime, this means that they will be among the front line troops in the defence of the State. In peacetime however they can may perform operational duties in Aid to the Civil Power (ATCP) such as providing escorts to cash, prisoner or explosive shipments, patrols of vital state installations and border patrols, including check points. The infantry corps consists of a total of seven battalions, a single mechanised company and the Infantry School.

== Units ==
Active units of the Infantry Corps:

- An Chéad Chathlán Coisithe
- 3 Infantry Battalion
- 6 Infantry Battalion
- 7 Infantry Battalion
- 12 Infantry Battalion
- 27 Infantry Battalion
- 28 Infantry Battalion
- 121st Infantry Battalion
- 1 Mechanised Infantry Company
- Infantry School
  - Officer Training Wing
  - Non Commissioned Officers Training Wing
  - Infantry Weapons Wing

Disestablished units:

- 2 Infantry Battalion (1924-2012)
- 4 Infantry Battalion (1924-2012)
- 5 Infantry Battalion (1924-2012)
- 6 Infantry Battalion (1924-1929) - (Current 6 Inf Bn established in 1940)
- 7 Infantry Battalion (1924-1929, 1940-1959) - (Current 7 Inf Bn established in 2012)
- 8 Infantry Battalion (1924-1929, 1940-1946)
- 9 Infantry Battalion (1924-1929, 1940-1946)
- 10 Infantry Battalion (1924-1929, 1940-1946)
- 11 Infantry Battalion (1924-1929, 1940-1946)
- 12 Infantry Battalion (1924-1929) - (Current 12 Inf Bn established in 1940)
- 13 Infantry Battalion (1924-1929, 1940-1959)
- 14 Infantry Battalion (1924-1928, 1941-1946)
- 15 Infantry Battalion (1924-1928, 1941-1946)
- 16 Infantry Battalion (1924-1928, 1941-2005)
- 17 Infantry Battalion (1924-1927, 1941-1946)
- 18 Infantry Battalion (1924-1927, 1941-1946)
- 19 Infantry Battalion (1924-1927, 1941-1946)
- 20 Infantry Battalion (1924-1927, 1941-1946)
- 21 Infantry Battalion (1924-1927, 1941-1946)
- 22 Infantry Battalion (1924-1927, 1941-1946)
- 23 Infantry Battalion (1924-1927, 1941-1946)
- 24 Infantry Battalion (1924-1927, 1941-1946)
- 25 Infantry Battalion (1924-1927, 1941-1946)
- 26 Infantry Battalion (1924-1927) - see also 26th Infantry Battalion (26ú Cathlán), formed during The Emergency
- 27 Infantry Battalion (1924-1927) - (Current 27 Inf Bn established in 1973)
- 29 Infantry Battalion (1976-1998)
- 30 Infantry Battalion (1977-1998)
- 31 Infantry Battalion (1941-1946)
- 125th Infantry Battalion (2024-2025)

Disestablished reserve units:

- 32 Reserve Infantry Battalion (Made up of 14, 15 and 22 Battalions of the FCA) (2012)
- 33 Reserve Infantry Battalion (2012)
- 34 Reserve Infantry Battalion (2012)
- 51 Reserve Infantry Battalion (2012)
- 56 Reserve Infantry Battalion (2012)
- 58 Reserve Infantry Battalion (2012)
- 62 Reserve Infantry Battalion (made up of 20 and 21 Battalions of the FCA) (2012)
- 65 Reserve Infantry Battalion (made up of 7 FCA Battalion) (2012)
- 67 Reserve Infantry Battalion (2012)

== An Chéad Chathlán Coisithe ==
An Chéad Chathlán Coisithe (English: the First Infantry Battalion) was established as an Irish language speaking unit in Galway in 1924. The role of An Chéad Chathlán Coisithe was seen as important as far as the status and use of the first official language (Irish) of the state was concerned. All the armed forces units except An Chéad Cathlán functioned exclusively through the medium of the State's second official language (English).

== Ceremonial Military Guard ==
The Ceremonial Military Guard (Garda Míleata Searmanais) of the Irish Defence Forces is a guard of honour unit drawn from every battalion in the corps. It is also known as the Garda Onóra ('guard of honour' in English).

The Ceremonial Military Guard participates in state ceremonial events connected with Presidential inaugurations, visits to Ireland by other heads of state and government, the presentation of credentials by ambassadors, state funerals, and events such as the National Day of Commemoration. During these ceremonies, the guard may be inspected by the President of Ireland, Taoiseach or visiting military and political dignitaries. It also takes part in the changing of the guard at Merrion Square park in Dublin.

Personnel of the guard carry Steyr AUG rifles. The Ceremonial Military Guard wears Service Dress (SD) on ceremonial occasions.

== Gallery ==
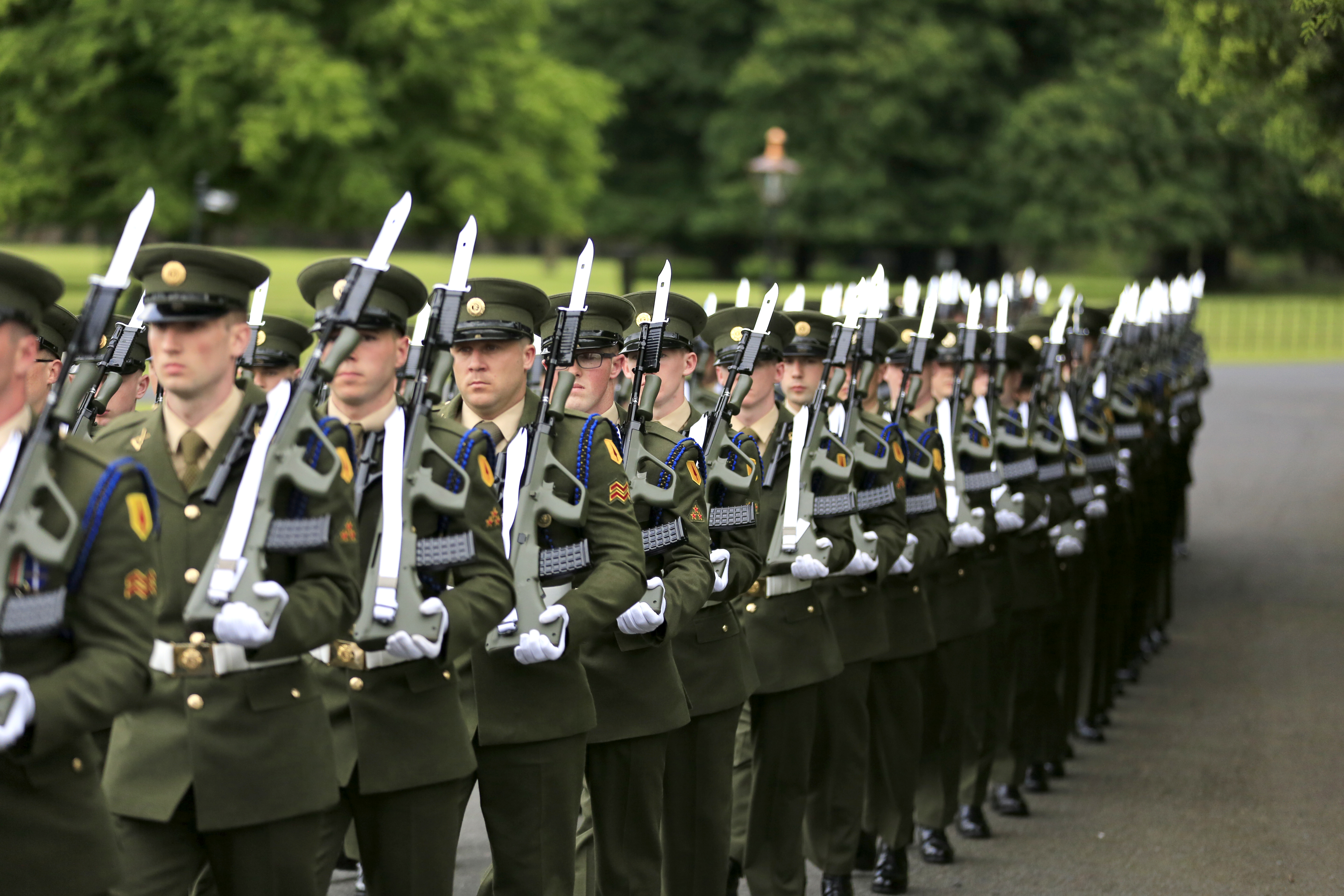
A ceremonial military guard provided by the 7th Infantry Battalion

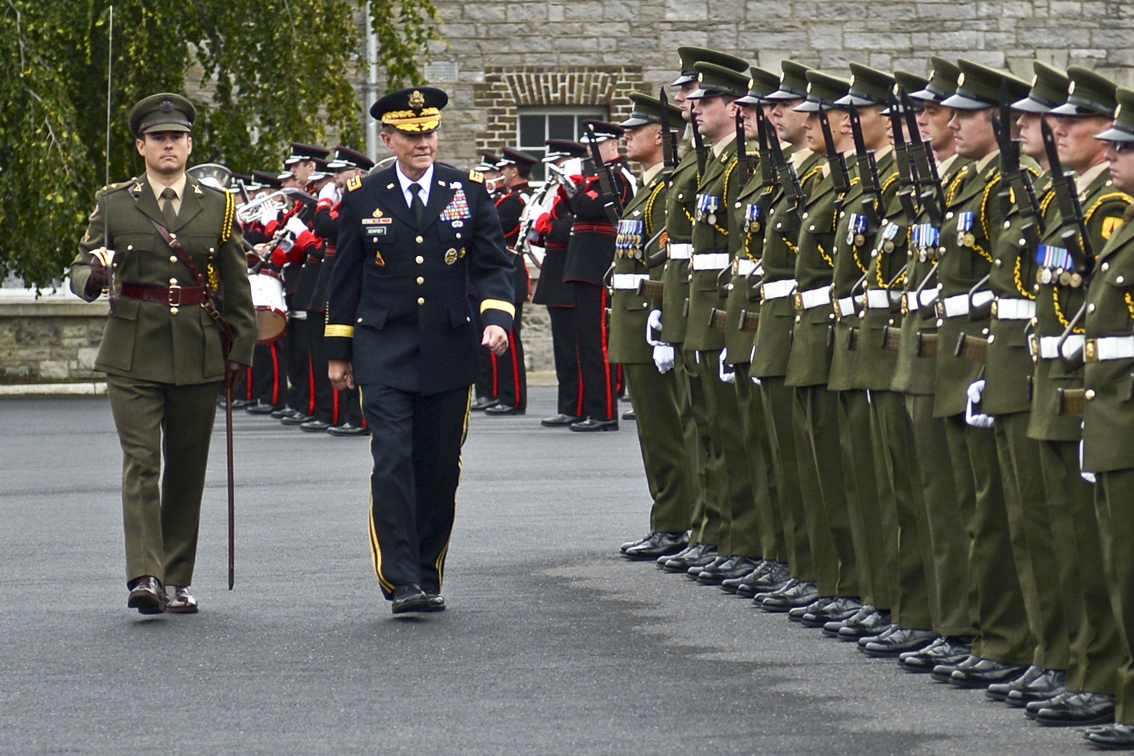
Gen. Martin E. Dempsey, chairman of the Joint Chiefs of Staff, reviews an honor guard at Brugha Barracks in Dublin, August 2012

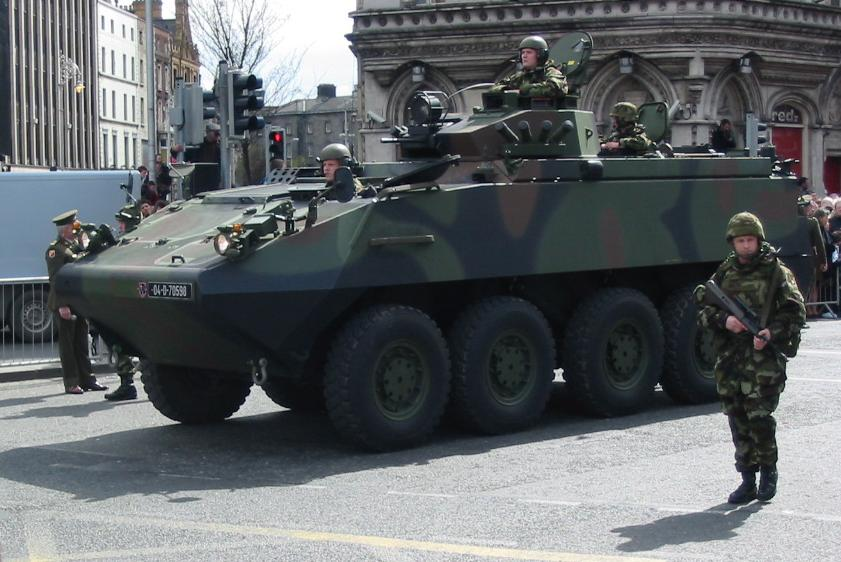
A Mowag Piranha of the 3rd Infantry Battalion at the 2006 Easter parade Dublin.
