= Caught in a Free State =

- Genre: Drama series
- Written by: Brian Lynch
- Directed by: Peter Ormrod
- Opening theme: Rosc Catha na Mumhan, as arranged by A. J. Potter
- Ending theme: Finnegan’s Wake, as arranged by A. J. Potter
- Composers: A. J. Potter and Seóirse Bodley
- Country of origin: Ireland
- Original language: English
- No. of episodes: 4

Production
- Production company: RTÉ

Original release
- Network: RTÉ One
- Release: 1983

Caught in a Free State is a dramatised television series made by RTÉ in 1983. This four-part series was about German spies in neutral Ireland during World War II, known in Ireland as "The Emergency".

== Episodes ==
The spies are frequently depicted as out of touch with the realities of Irish life. They are also often depicted as individuals highly unsuited for espionage. At times, the absurdities take on a comic dimension - such as in the arrest of Henry Obed, an Indian working for Abwehr. It is notable that the German plans for Operation Green (the intended invasion of Ireland) also included a considerable amount of outdated information.

Whilst dramatised (and some names have been changed, notably that of Schütz to "Schultz") the plots in Caught in a Free State are based on actual events and persons. The anachronistic reference to "Free State" is deliberate as the Irish Free State had been superseded by the new Constitution of Ireland of 1937, which is a recurring theme. Both Günther Schütz and Dan Bryan were still alive during the filming (in 1983), hence the change of names.

- Episode 1: Hermann Görtz is parachuted into Ireland. He tries to return to Germany by boat but is intercepted by the Irish Navy and interned.
- Episode 2: Ernst Weber-Drohl, a 60-year-old former circus strongman, is landed by submarine on the coast of County Wexford.
- Episode 3: "Gunter Schultz" is arrested, interrogated and threatened with execution for spying.
- Episode 4: The end of the War. Herman Görtz commits suicide rather than face deportation.

== Cast ==
- Goetz Burger as "Gunther Schultz" (based on Günther Schütz of Abwehr)
- Peter Jankowsky as Hermann Görtz (chief spy of Abwehr in Ireland)
- John Kavanagh as "Colonel Brian Dillon" (based on Colonel Dan Bryan of the G2 section of the Irish Army)
- Barry McGovern as Éamon de Valera (Taoiseach)
- Niall Tóibín as Stephen Hayes (IRA)
- O. Z. Whitehead as David Gray (US Ambassador to Ireland)

== Production ==
The series was written by Brian Lynch, with music by Seóirse Bodley and A. J. Potter - notably Potter’s arrangements of Finnegan’s Wake for the close and Rosc Catha na Mumhan for the opening. It was directed by Peter Ormrod and designed by Pat Molloy. Parts of the dialogue were recorded in German with English subtitles, partly in the hope of a sale of the series to a German television station.

== Broadcast ==
After first being shown in Ireland in 1983, it was also broadcast in the United Kingdom on Channel 4 in April 1984, and was repeated in July 1986.

== Awards and nominations ==
The series was the winner of the best drama award at the Banff World Television Festival in Canada and also won a Jacob's Award in Ireland.

== See also ==
- History of the Republic of Ireland
- Irish neutrality
- Irish neutrality during World War II
- IRA/Abwehr collaboration in World War II
- Plan Kathleen
- Operation Green
- Oskar Metzke
