= Centre for Cybersecurity & Cybercrime Investigation =

Centre for research and education in cybersecurity

Centre for Cybersecurity and Cybercrime Investigation
- Director: Joe Carthy
- Parent organization: University College Dublin
- Website: https://www.ucd.ie/cci/

The University College Dublin Centre for Cybersecurity & Cybercrime Investigation (UCD CCI) is a centre for research and education in cybersecurity, cybercrime and digital forensic science in Dublin, Ireland.

The UCD Centre for Cybersecurity & Cybercrime Investigation was established in 2006, and has developed collaborative relationships with law enforcement and industry from across the world. The Centre for Cybersecurity & Cybercrime Investigation is widely regarded as Europe's leading centre for research and education in cybersecurity, cybercrime and digital forensics. UCD CCI trains specialist officers from the Irish national police service, the Garda Síochána, Irish military personnel from the Defence Forces, as well as international law enforcement agencies Interpol and Europol, and authorities from over 40 countries. The CCI also runs educational qualifications and training for the industry sector and multinational corporations. The centre's director is Professor Joe Carthy BSc., PhD.

There is a Memorandum of Understanding between the Centre for Cybersecurity & Cybercrime Investigation at UCD and the National Cyber Security Centre (NCSC) at the DCCAE, the Irish government's computer emergency response team. Additionally, UCD CCI has formal relationships with the Garda Síochána, Irish Defence Forces, INTERPOL, Europol, Visa Inc., the Irish Banking Federation, as well as collaborations with the United Nations Office on Drugs and Crime (UNODC), the Organization for Security and Co-operation in Europe (OSCE), European Anti-Fraud Office (OLAF), Microsoft, Citibank and eBay.

== See also ==
- National Cyber Security Centre (NCSC)
- Garda Bureau of Fraud Investigation (GBFI)
- Communications and Information Services Corps (CIS)
- Garda National Cyber Crime Bureau
