= Director of Military Intelligence (Ireland) =

Head of Irish Military Intelligence Service

- Incumbent; Currently unknown
- Irish Military Intelligence Service; Defence Forces
- Reports to: Minister for Defence
- Appointer: Chief of Staff of the Defence Forces
- Salary: €135,955

The Director of Military Intelligence ("D J2") (Irish: Stiúrthóir Faisnéise Míleata) serves as the commanding officer of the Irish Military Intelligence Service, the intelligence section of the Irish Defence Forces, and the main foreign and domestic intelligence gathering service of Ireland. The D J2 is appointed by the Chief of Staff.

The Director of Military Intelligence is responsible for the provision of timely and accurate defence and security assessments to; the Chief of Staff, Minister for Defence and Secretary General of the Department of Defence, relating to internal and external threats to the security of the state and the national interest, and the safety and security of Defence Forces personnel deployed overseas on peace support operations. The Chief of Staff and the Secretary General are both members of the Government of Ireland's National Security Committee (NSC) and advise the committee on security and defence matters. Scheduled monthly intelligence summaries, threat assessments and briefings are provided in person by the Director to the Minister for Defence, who advises the cabinet and Taoiseach. The Director of Intelligence is usually a senior officer from the Irish Army, and holds the rank of Brigadier General.

The current Defence Forces Director of Military Intelligence is not publicly known.

== See also ==
- National Security Committee (Ireland)
- Chief of Staff of the Defence Forces (Ireland)
- Minister for Defence (Ireland)
- Colonel Dan Bryan
