= 62 Res CIS Company =

62 Reserve Field Communication & Information Services Company
- Unit Flash of the 62 Res CIS Coy
- Active: 2005-2013
- Country: Ireland
- Branch: Army
- Type: Communication and Information Services
- Role: Brigade Communications
- Size: Company
- Part of: Communications and Information Services Corps
- Garrison/HQ: Cathal Brugha Barracks
- Colors: Blue & Yellow

The 62 Reserve Field Communication and Information Services Company was an Irish Reserve Defence Forces Company of the Communications and Information Services Corps.

== Unit heritage ==
=== The Emergency ===
62 Reserve Field Communication & Information Services Company can trace its origin to 27 Parnell Square, Dublin in 1940 as the 11 Field Communications Battalion Local Defence Forces (LDF) under the command of Capt. M. Egan. It comprised a Headquarters (HQ) Company and seven other Companies. The unit was equipped with Field Telephone Exchanges, Signal Lamps and D. 3 cable. Training parades involved the use of this equipment in the field. On 31 March 1946 the LDF was disbanded and 596 members were awarded with the 'Emergency' service medal. The Battalion Penant was handed over to the Permanent Defence Forces (PDF) in Clancy Barracks for safe keeping.

=== An Forsa Cosanta Áitiúil (FCA) ===
An Forsa Cosanta Áitiúil (FCA) was founded on the first day of April 1946 and the unit reformed as a Field Signal Company under the command of Capt. P. Walsh FCA. 11 Field Signal Company FCA consisted of 44 members in 4 platoons based in Collins Barracks, Dublin. The unit was integrated into the 6 Infantry Brigade and came under the command of Comdt. J. Newman.

The unit was part of the Eastern Command's 6th Brigade from 1959.

=== The Troubles ===
11 Field Signals helped with refugees from Northern Ireland at the start of the troubles and completed a stint on the border. When 6th Brigade was disbanded in 1977 the unit transferred to the 2nd Brigade, remaining within Eastern Command.

=== Re-organisation ===
With the reorganisation of the Permanent Defence Forces (PDF) and the formation of the Communication and Information Services Corps from the old Signal Corps and Information Technology group the 11 Field Signal Company was re-established as the 11 Field Communication and Information Services Company (11 Field CIS Coy)

=== Reserve Defence Forces (RDF) ===
11 Field Communication and Information Services Company FCA was re-established as the 62 Reserve Field Communication and Information Services Company on the establishment of the Reserve Defence Forces from the An Forsa Cosanta Áitiúil (FCA). In April 2013 the unit was disestablished and its members integrated into its associated PDF unit, 2 Bde CIS Coy

== Locations and operations ==
The unit is based in Dublin: The unit headquarters is in Cathal Brugha Barracks.
