= 62nd Reserve Infantry Battalion (Ireland) =

- Shoulder Flash of the 62nd Reserve Infantry Battalion
- Active: 2005 - 2013
- Country: Ireland
- Branch: Army Reserve
- Type: Infantry
- Role: Light Role
- Size: Battalion
- Part of: Infantry Corps
- Garrison/HQ: Cathal Brugha Barracks, Dublin

The 62nd Reserve Infantry Battalion was an Infantry Battalion in the Irish Reserve Defence Forces (RDF).

== Unit Heritage ==
The 62nd Reserve Infantry battalion was formed from the 20th and the 21st Infantry battalions of the FCÁ after the re-organization of the Reserve Defence Forces in 2005. Individual sub units of the 20th Battalion had a rich history, such as D company which traced its roots from the original Regiment of Pearse. The 21st Battalion's Flash Bore the name and coat of arms of "The Wicklow Chief" Michael Dwyer.

== Location and Operations ==
The 62nd Reserve Infantry battalion was divided into six companies. A Coy - Casement Aerodrome (West Dublin). B Coy - Cathal Brugha Barracks, Rathmines, HQ Coy - Bray (County Wicklow). C Coy- County Wicklow. D Coy & Support Coy - Cathal Brugha Barracks, Rathmines.

In the RDF re-organisation of 2013, the 62nd Inf Bn was itself wound up (along with all other RDF units) as part of the new 'Single Force Concept', with members given the choice of either exiting service or transfer into new RDF sub-units integrated into PDF formations. The successor Infantry unit is the new 7th Inf Bn (itself a PDF re-org amalgamation of 2nd Inf Bn and 5th Inf Bn).
