= 26th Infantry Battalion =

26th Infantry Battalion may refer to:

- 26th Infantry Battalion (Ireland) (26ú Cathlán), a World War II unit
- 26th Infantry Battalion "Bergamo", an Italian unit in Pesaro
- 26th Infantry Battalion (Romania) (the Red Scorpions), in Craiova
