= Irish Military Intelligence Service =

- Seirbhís Faisnéise Míleata na hÉireann (Irish)
- Country: Ireland
- Branch: DFHQ
- Type: Military intelligence
- Role: Counterintelligence; Counter-terrorism; Security of critical infrastructure
- Size: Unknown
- Part of: Defence Forces
- Garrison/HQ: McKee Barracks, Dublin

Commanders
- Director of Military Intelligence: Brigadier General; Currently unknown

Insignia
- Abbreviation: "IMIS", formerly "J2" / "INT"

The Irish Military Intelligence Service (IMIS) (Irish: Seirbhís Faisnéise Míleata na hÉireann) is the military intelligence branch of the Irish Defence Forces, and the national intelligence service of Ireland. Previously known as the Directorate of Military Intelligence (J2) until July 2025, the organisation has responsibility for the safety and security of the Irish Defence Forces, its personnel, and supporting the national security of Ireland. The service operates domestic and foreign intelligence sections, providing intelligence to the Government of Ireland concerning threats to the security of the state and the national interest from internal and external sources.

Military Intelligence is a constituent part of Defence Forces Headquarters (DFHQ) and is the intelligence section of all Defence Forces branches. IMIS is a joint service and draws military staff (both permanent and reservists) from the Army, Naval Service and Air Corps. The Irish military special operations forces, the Army Ranger Wing (ARW), carries out physical tasks in support of Military Intelligence in Ireland and overseas, and the Communications and Information Services Corps (CIS) provides technical and electronic support. IMIS works closely with the Garda Síochána Special Detective Unit (SDU), the national police counter-terrorism and counter-espionage unit.

== Mission and organisation ==
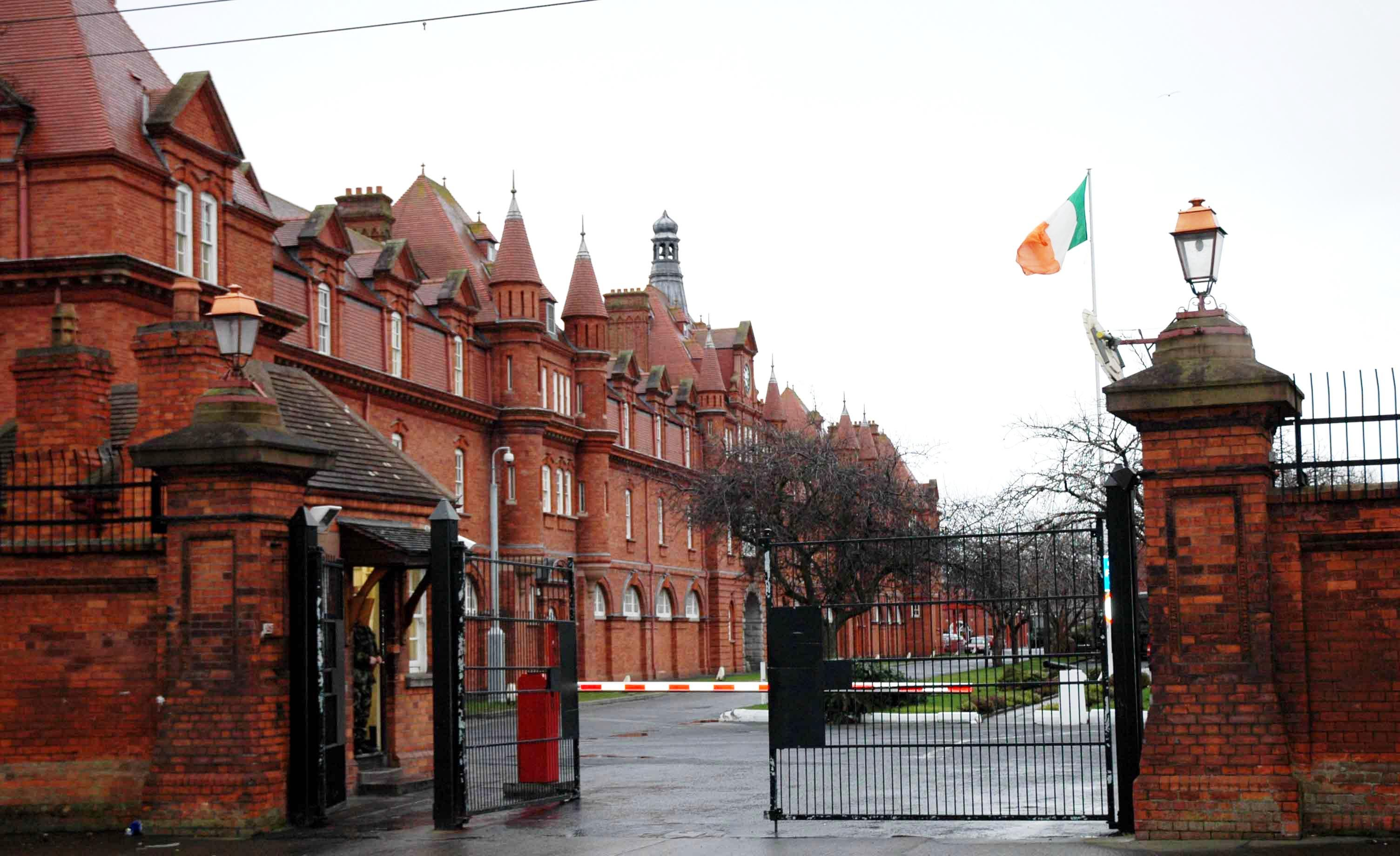
McKee Barracks in Dublin is the reported headquarters of IMIS

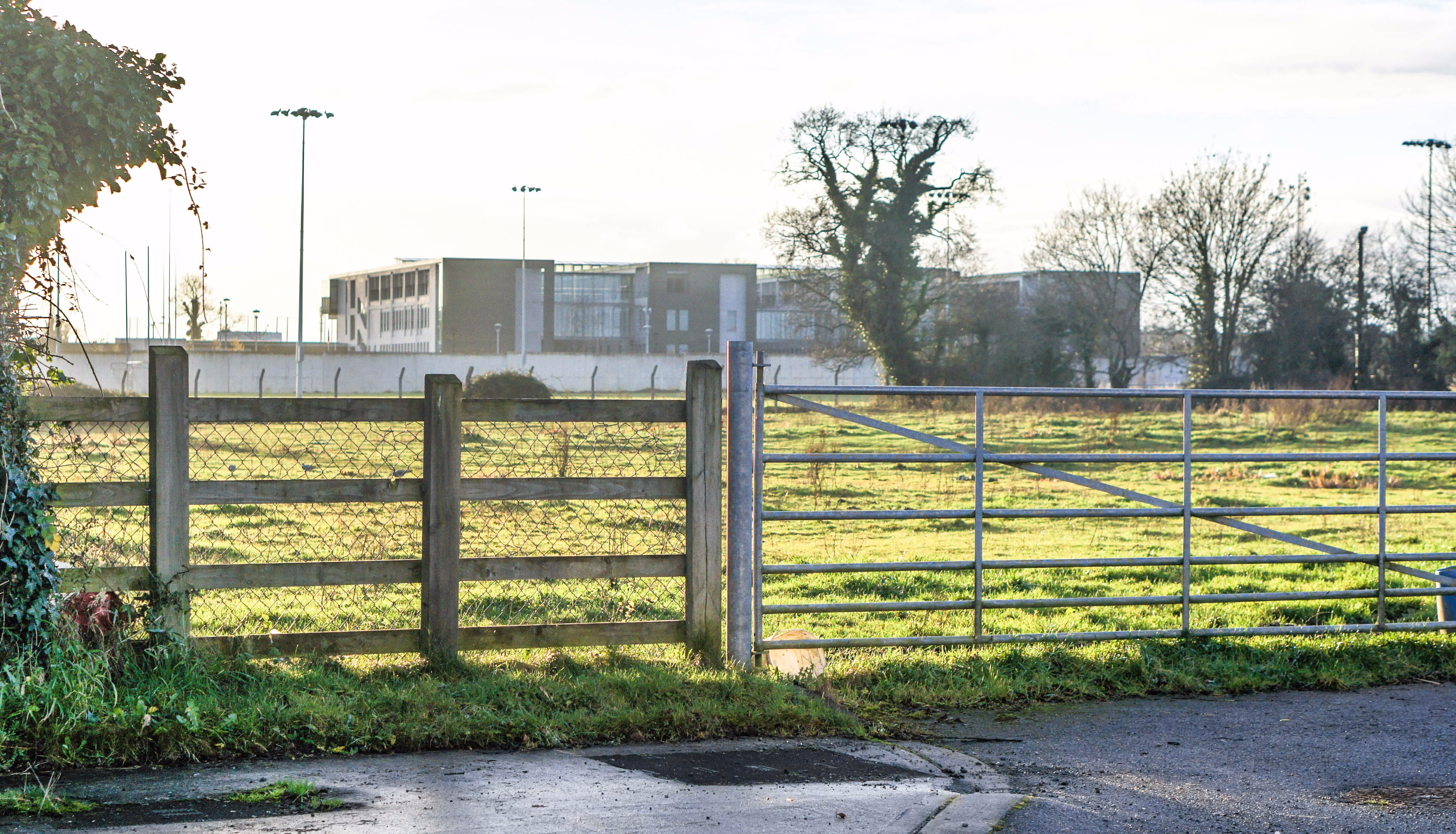
Military Intelligence is also believed to operate out of the Defence Forces Headquarters complex in Newbridge, County Kildare

The primary roles of IMIS are;

- To provide strategic warning to the General Staff and Government of Ireland on threats to Irish sovereign interests on the island;
- Ensuring National Security with other state agencies;
- To provide operational intelligence and security to deployed Irish forces globally;
- To act as the State's external intelligence service.

IMIS members are drawn from the entire Defence Forces (Army, Naval Service and Air Corps), both permanent and reservist military personnel and civilians who then serve with IMIS. Military Intelligence personnel regularly train, liaise and deploy with foreign intelligence, government and non-government agencies to share knowledge and best practices. This ensures they keep abreast of threats and are able to collate essential intelligence to further protect the state, the Defence Forces and its interests.

The service is under the command of a Brigadier General, known as the Director of Military Intelligence, who provides regular intelligence briefings to the Chief of Staff of the Defence Forces. The Director provides a monthly intelligence briefing in-person to the Minister for Defence. The Chief of Staff briefs the cabinet on matters of state security, as well as the secretive National Security Committee (NSC).

The organisation's number of employees and budget are classified, with a further 150-200 operatives in the Army Ranger Wing (ARW), who can conduct missions at the behest of Military Intelligence. Funding comes from the overall Department of Defence budget (€1.35 billion in 2025). The only publicly known funding is that for the budget to pay confidential informants, through the "Secret Service" budget, which is shared with the Garda Crime & Security Branch (CSB). In 2024, this figure was €2 million.

Operatives from Military Intelligence can carry firearms on operations both at home and abroad, and those in the service may not wear uniforms on operations. The Garda Special Detective Unit (SDU) works closely with the Intelligence Branch on domestic matters. Military Intelligence operates out of a number of locations in Dublin and County Kildare, and their headquarters are understood to be based at McKee Barracks, Dublin and the Department of Defence Headquarters in Newbridge, County Kildare. The latter is rumoured to house sophisticated modern technology for espionage; the building was completed in 2010 after a number of years of construction, at a cost of €30 million. Intelligence and language training takes place at the Military College, Defence Forces Training Centre (DFTC), Curragh Camp.

In Ireland, national security is primarily the responsibility of the Garda Síochána (national police service), while the Defence Forces are responsible for intelligence.

== Structure ==
=== Intelligence School ===
The Defence Forces Intelligence School is based at the Defence Forces Training Centre, Curragh Camp in County Kildare and was formalised in 2025. It is responsible for professionalising standards and training in the development of joint military intelligence capabilities for IMIS and the delivery of specialised capabilities for IMIS, such as HUMINT, SIGINT, GEOINT and OSINT. The development of the standalone school was a result of the recommendations from the Report of the Commission on Defence Forces (published in 2022). It establishes a professional pathway for military intelligence careers within IMIS. The Intelligence School is responsible for ensuring the Defence Forces remain aligned with international best practice and emerging technologies to identify and counter potential hostile threats.

=== Defence Intelligence Section ===
The Defence Intelligence (DI) Section is staffed by military commissioned and non-commissioned officers. It is tasked with providing intelligence support to the Defence Forces. Staff actively monitor relevant political, economic, social and military situations globally to produce intelligence reports and strategic studies to support operations. Personnel in this section can be found briefing all the way up to the Minister for Defence. IMIS is responsible for conducting background checks of all Defence Forces personnel through close cooperation with the Garda National Vetting Bureau (GNVB). The Defence Intelligence Section is tasked with keeping members of the Defence Forces safe, be it in Ireland or abroad during active military engagements. The Army Ranger Wing Intelligence Section deploys in foreign countries alongside Military Intelligence soldiers during Irish military deployments, which are generally peacekeeping missions on behalf of the United Nations, European Union and NATO (Partnership for Peace), due to Ireland's policy of military neutrality.

=== National Security Intelligence Section ===
The National Security Intelligence Section (NSIS) deals with threats to the state and the Defence Forces. This includes identifying, monitoring and assessing possible threats to the state and Irish national interests at home and abroad, be it by hostile intelligence services, terrorist groups and/or criminal organisations. Counter-intelligence forms a large part of the section's remit, in addition to fulfilling counter-terrorist, counter-subversion, counterinsurgency, counter-sabotage roles, and physical security of critical infrastructure. The National Security Intelligence Section works very closely with the Garda SDU and Garda National Surveillance Unit (NSU) to spy on potential terrorism threats, particularly from Islamic terrorists and dissident republicans. Military Intelligence has a number of Arabic speakers in their ranks as a result of Defence Forces deployments overseas.

Separately, outside of Defence Forces Headquarters, the Naval Service maintains a Naval Intelligence Cell within its Intelligence and Fishery Section at Naval Operations Command, Haulbowline Naval Base, Cork Harbour, which is responsible for the collection, collation and dissemination of Naval Intelligence. The Air Corps maintains an Air Intelligence Section at its HQ at Casement Aerodrome, Baldonnel, County Dublin responsible for aviation intelligence.

During 2025, a number of designated regional IMIS intelligence "hubs" were established at military installations in Ireland, reporting centrally into IMIS.

== History ==
Founded in the mid-1920s following the Anglo-Irish Treaty, the Office of the Directorate of Intelligence was originally the intelligence arm of the Irish Army, hence its code-name "G2", which is a designation in NATO's continental staff system used to refer to an army intelligence, security, and information branch. Later, the Directorate became the intelligence service for the entire Irish armed forces; it was then referred to as "J2" (which refers to joint services, i.e. the Army, Naval Service and Air Corps) and took on more national security roles. G2 spent much of its early efforts combating the Anti-Treaty IRA, in the Republic of Ireland, and also operated in Northern Ireland.

=== World War II ===
G2 first came to public attention during World War II (1939–1945), known in Ireland as The Emergency. Although Ireland had a policy of military neutrality and was "non-belligerent" during WWII, G2 formed secret agreements with the United Kingdom's Military Intelligence Section 5 (MI5) and the United States' Office of Strategic Services (OSS), the predecessor to the Central Intelligence Agency (CIA). During this period, G2 intercepted German naval and aerial communications through listening stations located across Ireland, sharing the information with Allied forces. Under Colonel Daniel "Dan" Bryan, Director of Intelligence, G2 apprehended all thirteen Nazi spies sent to Ireland, notably Hermann Görtz, and broke German codes during the war, under the supervision of cryptologist Richard J. Hayes.

During this period, G2 also undertook intelligence operations in Europe, including a notable covert mission in April 1943 where G2 officers travelled to neutral Portugal by flying boat, using the cover of the Irish Red Cross delivering supplies to refugees in Spain, in order to gather information on the Irish minister (precursor to ambassador) in Madrid whom the Irish government had become increasingly suspicious about, due to his close links with Germany. Leopold H. Kerney had been visited by Edmund Veesenmayer, a senior Waffen-SS officer, who was one of the main Nazis involved in plotting secret Nazi operations in Ireland. G2 made contact with British spies in Lisbon and Madrid and concluded that Kerney was in fact neutral.

=== The Troubles in Northern Ireland ===
G2 was involved throughout The Troubles (late 1960s to 1998), and Army officers were sent across the border into Northern Ireland on intelligence-gathering missions from 1969.

In August 1969 Taoiseach Jack Lynch asked Irish Army Intelligence to draft proposals for a military intervention and guerrilla operations in Northern Ireland in order to protect Irish nationalists there from sectarian attack from Ulster loyalist mobs, under a plan known as Exercise Armageddon. However, it was deemed unworkable and was not adopted by the cabinet. Nationalist areas were later given a form of protection by British forces under Operation Banner.

In 1970, the Arms Crisis and subsequent trial engulfed the state in a political scandal in which Irish Army intelligence officer Captain James Kelly was implicated in an unauthorised covert operation with the knowledge of Minister for Finance Charles Haughey and Minister for Agriculture and Fisheries Neil Blaney whereby £50,000 of a secret Irish government humanitarian fund of £100,000 (which had been set-up to help refugees fleeing Northern Ireland) was diverted and used to illegally import and smuggle arms and ammunition for the Provisional Irish Republican Army (IRA). The Garda Special Branch became aware of the unsanctioned operation and informed Minister for Justice Mícheál Ó Móráin and Taoiseach Lynch, who were slow to take action. Sensing this inaction, the Special Branch leaked the information to the press and the leader of the opposition Fine Gael leader Liam Cosgrave, who put pressure on Lynch to act. This resulted in Ministers Haughey (who later became Taoiseach) and Blaney being sacked from their posts, Captain Kelly was forced to resign, and the subsequent trial of all three in which the case collapsed and they were cleared of charges.

=== Cold War ===
During the Cold War, G2 monitored known and suspected communists as well as agents of communist governments operating in Ireland, primarily through embassies in Dublin, sharing information with western allies.

Declassified intelligence files marked "Confidential" released at the end of 2019, after 30 years, show Irish government concerns over the possibility of British nuclear weapons in Northern Ireland. Colonel L Buckley, then Director of Intelligence, briefed Peter Barry, then foreign minister, in November 1983 on the possibility of British/NATO nuclear missiles on the island of Ireland. Col Buckley believed nuclear weapons could be situated at underground facilities inside Benbradagh mountain in Derry, which US forces used as a communications hub in order to communicate with its North Atlantic fleet, but which were also designed for the storage of conventional high explosives. Col Buckley complained that he did not have "the monitoring or surveillance systems" to confirm the presence of nuclear weapons in Northern Ireland, but that the British strongly denied land-based systems in the territory and refused to confirm the movements of air and sea-based nuclear weapons.

A separate file marked "Secret" from June 1985 shows that Irish military intelligence carried out reconnaissance on a British Army installation at Forkhill, Armagh (Northern Ireland), after it received information of "strong rumours" from locals that it was being converted into a nuclear facility. Their findings "strongly discounted the possibility". Materials had been brought into the base in night convoys, but this was done for security reasons, and it was noted that there were underground facilities at Forkhill, but that these were for accommodation and protection in the event of a mortar attack. Military intelligence did, however, have a reservation that Forkhill was "now on a microwave communications network which would have a NATO function in relation to possible nuclear attack".

IMIS has been deployed numerous times alongside Irish forces on peacekeeping duties globally, mainly to ensure the safety and security of Irish troops, but also to provide intelligence on hostile forces. It is considered one of the most secretive intelligence agencies in Europe, and the Irish government and Defence Forces rarely allude to its very existence.

== Operations ==
=== Foreign activities ===
Following the September 11 attacks on the United States in 2001, the Directorate of Military Intelligence significantly expanded its operations both internally and externally to provide the Irish government with a better intelligence picture in relation to terror threats emanating from al-Qaeda and affiliated groups, working with western partners. The 2004 Madrid train bombings (11-M) in Spain and 7 July 2005 London bombings in the United Kingdom also saw an increase in the budget and deployments of Irish intelligence officers.

From 2006 to 2014, it has been reported that Military Intelligence and ARW Intelligence Section operatives were on the ground in; Afghanistan, Syria, Lebanon, Israel, Sudan, Ivory Coast, Liberia, Kosovo and Bosnia-Herzegovina as part of various international missions. IMIS receives intelligence reports from civil servants posted at Irish diplomatic missions overseas, via the Department of Foreign Affairs (DFA). Irish Military Intelligence works closely with the British Security Service (MI5) and Secret Intelligence Service (SIS/MI6), American Central Intelligence Agency (CIA) and National Security Agency (NSA), and is understood to have a relationship with Israeli Mossad.

The Defence Forces and Garda Síochána provide security briefings to Department of Foreign Affairs employees and their families regarding potential terrorist attacks in host countries they are posted to.

In May 2019, J2 was reported to have drawn up a plan to extract Lisa Smith – a former Irish Army soldier who converted to Islam before fleeing Ireland to join ISIS – and her two-year-old child from Syria by working with US military intelligence, who agreed to the plan. She would have been brought by Kurdish forces who had arrested her south to the Jordanian border by US military intelligence where Irish military intelligence would have escorted her back to Ireland. The plan was presented to the government by Minister Kehoe but was rejected by the government. There was reported to be significant dissatisfaction within J2 and the higher levels of the Defence Forces with the government's decision, as intelligence officers believed their experience put them in the best position to extract Smith and her child safely and quietly, rather than the DFA or Gardaí. Later, in October 2019 it was reported the Army Ranger Wing had been deployed to the Syrian border in order to try and extract Smith and her child in a Non-Combatant Evacuation Operation after the 2019 Turkish offensive into north-eastern Syria resulted in Kurdish-held ISIS prisoners escaping, including Smith, although the Defence Forces did not confirm this.

=== Domestic activities ===
It has been alleged that Ireland facilitated the CIA's extraordinary rendition program of terrorism suspects in the aftermath of 9/11, including the secret detention and interrogation of suspects. It is claimed that Irish airports Casement Aerodrome (military) and Shannon International Airport (civilian) – used by the US military as stopover hubs – have been used by the CIA for rendition operations, with support from the Irish government.

Military Intelligence and the Garda Special Detective Unit's Middle Eastern Desk are tasked with monitoring potential jihadists in Ireland and Irish citizens who fight abroad in warzones – specifically Syria and Iraq – for Muslim extremist organisations such as the self-proclaimed "Islamic State".

=== Electronic surveillance ===
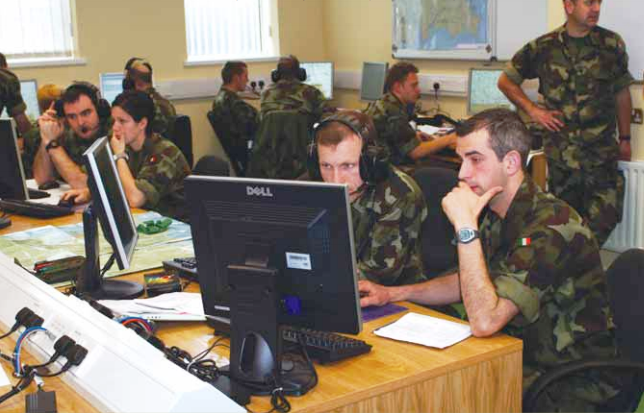
The Defence Forces CIS Corps have a signals intelligence role

Ireland has been reported to be a member of the ECHELON SIGINT (signals intelligence) network, sharing and receiving information with its members (Australia, Canada, New Zealand, United Kingdom and United States). The Defence Forces CIS Corps is jointly responsible with IMIS for SIGINT and cyber operations within the Defence Forces.

According to the Department of Defence: "The Defence Forces adheres to the provisions of all legislation regulating the conduct of intelligence gathering. The Interception of Postal Packets and Telecommunications Messages (Regulation) Act 1993 does provide the Defence Forces with the authority to conduct intelligence-led operations involving surveillance, electronic communications and stored electronic information in order to safeguard and maintain the security of the State. The Criminal Justice (Surveillance) Act 2009 also provides for surveillance to be conducted by the Defence Forces in order to safeguard the security of the State."

The Directorate of Military Intelligence ceased the practice of providing transcripts of intercepts on mobile phone calls, landlines, texts, emails and other raw intelligence to the CIA in 2011/2012. It now provides information on Irish residents to foreign intelligence services through a mutual assistance programme instead. A warrant signed by the Minister for Defence or the Minister for Justice, Home Affairs and Migration is required to intercept a telephone call or email of an Irish citizen.

IMIS maintains a secure information technology network and a registry of classified documentation. All intelligence electronically transmitted to IMIS from abroad comes via secured data links to the Army's Intelligence Comcen (Communications Centre), where messages are encrypted and electronically logged before being passed on for analysis. IMIS computer systems are linked with the Garda CSB for the purpose of information sharing and cross-analysis.

A report in late 2018 found that the Defence Forces had received 1,380 disclosures of communication data (mobile, landline and internet) based on requests to phone and internet firms over the five years 2013 to 2017 under the powers of the Communications (Retention of Data) Act 2011. The Defence Forces can only seek data for state security – and averaging more than 5 requests per week – they were the next biggest user of such data after the Garda Síochána, ahead of the Revenue Commissioners and Garda Síochána Ombudsman Commission.

== Training and selection ==
Individuals can apply to be selected for IMIS, and they must be Officers or NCOs to be considered for appointment. Unlike a number of similar military forces, the Irish Defence Forces actively include intelligence as part of Officer and NCO education, but those selected to join IMIS receive further specialist training. The Defence Forces run their own Defence Intelligence & Security Course (DISC). The course runs for a number of months and covers the main areas of intelligence operations, including the principles of intelligence operations, defence intelligence, intelligence analysis, and combat intelligence. The course is supported by additional "on-the-job" training. This includes additional weapons, surveillance and communications training to support ongoing operations. Further training in languages is available, and specialist training on sensitive subjects such as religion, culture, ethnicity and radicalisation are also provided. Members of the Intelligence Branch may also receive further training with friendly forces overseas, such as in imagery intelligence.

IMIS consists of a high proportion of commissioned officers, most of whom will enter IMIS with third-level education, a Level 7 or Level 8 Bachelor's degree as per modern Defence Forces education standards and may go on to undertake further academic studies (such as a Level 9 Master's or higher) in a relevant field.

== Known locations ==
- McKee Barracks, Blackhorse Avenue, Cabra East, Dublin 7
- Defence Forces Headquarters (Department of Defence), Station Road, Newbridge Town, County Kildare
- Defence Forces Intelligence School, Defence Forces Training Centre, Curragh Camp, County Kildare (Defence Intelligence and Security, languages)
- Naval Operations Command, Haulbowline Naval Base, Cork Harbour (Naval Intelligence Cell, Intelligence and Fishery Section)
- Casement Aerodrome, Baldonnel, County Dublin 22 (Air Intelligence Section)

== See also ==
- List of intelligence agencies
- Signals intelligence by alliances, nations and industries
- National Cyber Security Centre
