= Office of Emergency Planning =

Office of Emergency Planning may refer to:

- Office of Emergency Planning (Ireland), a civil/military body within Ireland's Department of Defence.
- Office of Civil and Defense Mobilization, an abolished office of the Executive Office of the President of the United States.
