= 5th Infantry Battalion (Ireland) =

Former Irish Military Unit

- 5ú Cathlán Coisithe
- Unit flash of the 5 Infantry Battalion
- Active: 1 February 1923 – 30 November 2012
- Disbanded: 2012
- Country: Ireland
- Branch: Army
- Type: Infantry
- Size: Battalion
- Part of: 2nd Brigade
- Headquarters: Collins Barracks, Dublin. (1928-1940) (1959-1997); McKee Barracks, Dublin (1997-2012)
- Nickname: Fighting Fifth
- Mascot: Wolfhound
- Anniversaries: 1 February

The 5th Infantry Battalion (5th Inf Bn; Irish: 5ú Cathlán Coisithe) was an Infantry Battalion of the Irish Army from 1923 to its disbanding in 2012.

The battalion was usually associated with Collins Barracks for most of its existence, but McKee Barracks was its final headquarters, after Collins Barracks was converted into a museum in 1997.

== History ==
=== Formation and early history ===
The 5th Infantry Battalion was formed in Athlone on February first 1923 under the Athlone Command of the Irish Army. A large amount of the battalion's Staff Officers had seen combat during the War of Independence as members of the North Longford Flying Column under rebel leader Sean MacEoin, specifically during the Battle of Ballinalee.

The battalion was relocated several times in its early years, first in 1924 to the Curragh Camp, then again in 1928 to Portobello Barracks in Dublin, and one more time in 1929 to Collins Barracks, which remained its headquarters until 1941.

=== The Emergency ===
Shortly after the start of The Emergency in 1940, the battalion's companies were put on a rotating garrison duty in a number of locations in County Meath. In August 1941 the battalion returned to Portobello Barracks. While headquartered there it participated in the Blackwater military exercises, which included a march from Dublin to Cork, a month of exercises and a march back to Dublin. In October 1942 it was transferred to Bray. While headquartered in Bray, the 5th maintained garrisons in a number of locations elsewhere in the country, including Killiney and Greystones. The 5th Battalion relocated again in January 1946 when it was transferred back to Gormanston Camp. While back in Gormanstown the 18th Infantry Battalion was merged with the 5th. The battalion left Gormanston Camp in November 1946. It was moved a few more times towards the end of The Emergency, including to Griffith Barracks and Cathal Brugha Barracks.

=== Later History ===
Shortly after the end of the Emergency, the 5th completely absorbed the 18th. In an Army reorganisation in 1959 the battalion also absorbed the remnants of the recently disbanded 7th Infantry Battalion, and was moved back to Collins Barracks.

Soldiers of the 5th participated in the United Nations Operation in the Congo as part of the 33rd Infantry Battalion, during the Niemba Ambush several members of the battalion were killed, representing the 5th's first overseas casualties. During ONUC, Lieutenant Patrick Riordan, Corporal Gerard Francis and Corporal Patrick Gregan were all awarded the Distinguished Service Medal, Ireland's most prestigious military award.

In 1997, it was announced that Collins Barracks was being incorporated into the National Museum of Ireland. The 5th Battalion would thus have to be relocated. A ceremony was held on 18 April that year, after which the 5th marched out of the barracks. The battalion moved to its new headquarters, McKee Barracks, just a short distance away.

The 5th Infantry Battalion provided the Guard of Honour for Queen Elizabeth II during her visit to Ireland in 2011, with Captain Thomas Holmes commanding the Guard.

The 5th was disbanded in November 2012 after a significant reorganisation of the Defence Forces. Its remnants were mainly incorporated into the reformed 7th Infantry Battalion, a unit it had ironically absorbed 53 years prior.
