= Dan Bryan =

WWII Irish Army officer (1900–1985)

Colonel Dan Bryan (1900–1985) was an officer in the Irish Army and Director of Military Intelligence G2 (the Irish Army's intelligence section) during World War II, known in neutral Ireland as "The Emergency", who "masterminded the most sophisticated security operation in the history of the Irish state."

Daniel Bryan (more often known as Dan) was born in Dunbell, Gowran, County Kilkenny in 1900. From 1916, he studied medicine for two years at the National University of Ireland. In November 1917 he joined the Irish Volunteers to fight against British rule in Ireland.

The Irish Free State was created in 1922. During the subsequent Irish Civil War Bryan opted to join the National Army (later known as the Irish Army). He was commissioned to the rank of Captain in September 1923. He would remain in the Irish Army until his retirement in 1955.

For much of his career, he served with the Headquarters Staff, specialising in intelligence. In 1940 when a cipher was found on the first German agent to be captured in Ireland, Wilhelm Preetz, Bryan recruited Richard J. Hayes Director of the National Library of Ireland as a codebreaker and closely co-operated with him in the breaking of German codes. In 1942 he succeeded Liam Archer as Director of G2; he exercised a decisive personal contribution toward the detection and arrest of German spies in Ireland, such as Hermann Görtz and Günther Schütz. Bryan remained head of G2 for the remainder of the War.

In 1952 he was appointed Commandant of the Irish Military College.

In 1983, RTÉ made a dramatised television series (Caught in a Free State) about German spies in Ireland during World War II. A character closely based on Dan Bryan – "Colonel Brian Dillon" – was played by the Irish actor John Kavanagh.

== See also ==
- Irish neutrality
- Irish neutrality in World War II
