= Garda National Cyber Crime Bureau =

The Garda National Cyber Crime Bureau is the branch of the Garda Síochána that investigates computer crime, including providing digital forensics.

== History ==
The unit was established in 1991 as part of the Garda National Economic Crime Bureau and known as the Cyber Crime Investigation Unit. With the growth in computer crime and the Commission on the Future of Policing in Ireland report, the unit was re-established in 2017.

== Organisation ==
The unit is divided into Computer Forensics 1 (CFE1) and 2 (CFE2), the Cybercrimes Investigations Unit, the Cyber Intelligence Unit, the Cyber Security Unit and Cyber Safety Unit.

The unit has headquarters in Harcourt Square, Dublin and in 2021 four hubs were established in Cork, Galway, Mullingar and Wexford.

== Responsibilities ==
1. The unit provides digital forensics capabilities and examines digital media seized in criminal investigations.
2. It also trains people to be digital first responders who work with local District Detective Units.
3. It investigates child exploitation cases and tries to identify the makers of child abuse material.

== Cases ==
=== Park Magic hack ===
David Young of Cloyne, County Cork was charged with intentionally accessing an information system without lawful authority or reasonable excuse, intentionally hindering or interrupting the functioning of an information system at the Vodafone Ireland data centre at Clonshaugh Business and Technology Park, operating a computer in Cork city with an intent to make a gain for himself and a loss for others and also making a demand with menaces by threatening to release customer information. His mother and a third person were also charged. This followed a two-year investigation by the Bureau. Detective Garda Paul Fitzpatrick testified to the arrest, charge and caution of all involved.

In October 2021 David Young pleaded guilty to the charges.

=== HSE ransomware attack ===
After the National Cyber Security Centre had restored the Health Service Executive computers, the bureau began investigating the case.
