= Garda National Economic Crime Bureau =

Division of Ireland's police

- Biúró Náisiúnta an Gharda Síochána um Choireacht Eacnamaíoch

Agency overview
- Formed: 1 April 1996; 30 years ago
- Preceding agency: Fraud Squad, Central Detective Unit
- Jurisdiction: Ireland
- Headquarters: Harcourt Square, Dublin, Ireland
- Agency executive: Pat Lordan, Detective Chief Superintendent in charge of NECB
- Parent agency: Garda Síochána
- Website: www.garda.ie/en/about-us/organised-serious-crime/garda-national-economic-crime-bureau/

The Garda National Economic Crime Bureau (GNECB; formerly Garda Bureau of Fraud Investigation/GBFI) – informally known as the Fraud Squad – is a specialised division of Ireland's national police force, the Garda Síochána, that investigates economic crimes. The Bureau operates as part of the Garda Special Crime Operations branch and works alongside other sections of the force, as well as the external Office of the Director of Corporate Enforcement (ODCE), an agency tasked with investigating white-collar crime. The Economic Crime Bureau is responsible for the investigation of serious financial fraud and corruption. It was established in April 1996 and is based at Harcourt Square, Dublin 2. The GNECB is headed by an officer of Detective Chief Superintendent rank, who reports to the Assistant Commissioner of Special Crime Operations.

The Economic Crime Bureau investigates serious and complex cases of commercial fraud, money laundering, terrorist financing, cheque and payment card fraud, counterfeit currency, advance fee fraud, bribery and corruption and breaches of the Companies Acts and competition law. As an investigative unit, all members are experienced investigators, and include trained financial, legal and specialists, such as forensic accountants.

The GNECB is divided into a number of operational units with a Detective Superintendent or Detective Inspector in charge of each specialist area:

- Assessment Unit
- Serious Economic Crime Investigation Unit
- Anti-Corruption Unit
- Money Laundering Investigation Unit (MLIU)
- Financial Intelligence Unit (FIU)
- Payment Crime and Counterfeit Currency Investigation Unit
- Corporate Enforcement Unit (GNECB detectives are seconded to the Director of Corporate Enforcement)

Until 1 September 2016, the Garda National Cyber Crime Bureau (GNCCB) was housed within the National Economic Crime Bureau, including its time as the Computer Crime Investigation Unit (CCIU). However, it was subsequently constituted as a separate Bureau within the Special Crime Operations section of the Garda Síochána, with oversight by the Detective Chief Superintendent of the GNECB. The Bureau is headed by a Detective Superintendent and is responsible for the investigation of cybercrime and cyber-related crime, and for the provision of a computer forensic service to the Garda Síochána.

The Economic Crime Bureau focuses on major and complex economic crimes based on the following criteria: monetary loss, investigations involving a significant international dimension, investigations concerning widespread public concern, investigations requiring specialised knowledge and investigations involving complex issues of law or procedure. The Bureau's responsibility includes the gathering of information and financial intelligence (FININT) for the force and Irish government, extending to terrorism financing, and proactively detecting and preventing fraud through sting operations.

As part of European Union (EU) counter-terrorism initiatives on tackling Islamic extremism and jihadism, the Garda National Cyber Crime Bureau monitors suspects in Ireland and outside the jurisdiction using the internet to distribute propaganda such as videos linked to terror groups, especially the Islamic State of Iraq and the Levant. It was established in 2016.

The GNECB works particularly closely with the Office of the Director of Corporate Enforcement, Revenue Commissioners, Criminal Assets Bureau (CAB) and internally with the Garda National Bureau of Criminal Investigation (NBCI) relating to investigations concerning issues such as monetary fraud, suspicious transaction reports (STR), racketeering, embezzlement, corruption and bribery. The GNECB is a member of the Egmont Group of Financial Intelligence Units.

== See also ==
- Director of Corporate Enforcement (ODCE)
- Criminal Assets Bureau (CAB)
- Garda National Bureau of Criminal Investigation (NBCI)
- National Cyber Security Centre (NCSC)
- Centre for Cybersecurity & Cybercrime Investigation (UCD CCI)
- Irish competition law
- Criminal Justice (Theft and Fraud Offences) Act 2001
