= 4th Infantry Battalion (Ireland) =

- 4ú Cathlán Coisithe
- Active: 1923 – 2012
- Disbanded: 2012
- Country: Ireland
- Branch: Army
- Type: Infantry
- Size: Battalion
- Headquarters: Collins Barracks, Cork

The 4th Infantry Battalion was an Infantry Battalion of the Irish Army from 1923 to 2012 based out of Collins Barracks, Cork. It was one of the oldest units of the Irish Army before its disbandment.

== History ==
=== Irish Civil War ===
The 4th Infantry Battalion formed during the Irish Civil War in 1923 when all troops then based in Renmore Barracks in Galway were so designated. In 1924 the new unit was transferred to Castlebar where it was commanded by Commandant John Haughey, father of Charles Haughey.

=== Second World War ===
In 1930, the battalion had been transferred to Cork City, its base for the next eighty years. Following the declaration of The Emergency in 1939, the battalion was tasked with the protection of Foynes seaplane base and the transatlantic cable on Valentia. In May 1940 the unit became the core of a mobile column tasked with the defence of the southwest coast, and the following year became the spearhead of the newly formed 3rd Infantry Brigade.

The 4th Infantry Battalion at this time continued intensive training for their task and in 1944 carried out a 42-mile march with forty pounds of kit in under twelve hours, later recognised as a world record achievement.

=== Congo Crisis ===
In 1960, troops from the 4th Battalion deployed to the Congo with B Company of 32nd Inf Bn. Four Distinguished Service Medals DSMs were won by 4th Battalion soldiers including Lieutenant Colonel Patrick Barry for his rescue of 250 civilians at Manono, CS Walter O’Sullivan and CQMS Anthony Connolly.

=== The Troubles ===
In August 1969 a company was hurriedly despatched from Collins Barracks to the border due to the outbreak of violence in Northern Ireland. They remained under canvas in Camp Arrow near Letterkenny until the winter. It would be the first of many border deployments, the men from Cork carrying out patrols, checkpoints and guarding vital installations in the border region as well as many other ATCP duties as for example when the 4th Battalion secured Baldonnel for the visit of British Prime Minister Edward Heath in 1973.

On 26 May 1977, Support Company was conducting a mortar shoot in the Glen of Imaal when a tragic explosion took place, killing five soldiers.

=== United Nations ===
In 1978, 4th Infantry Battalion deployed to UNIFIL, and provided two platoons for B Company of 43 Irishbatt, the first personnel arriving at Ben-Gurion Airport in Tel-Aviv on 20 May after which they were driven to Haris and then marched to Coy HQ in Tibnine. That October, Cpl Noel Mullins won the battalion’s fifth Distinguished Service Medal "for displaying calmness, courage and dedication to duty above the average, when unarmed and isolated from his parent unit and under severe physical and psychological duress, Corporal Mullins gave first aid to a wounded comrade and continued to function effectively as an observer at an isolated observation post [OP RAS] in South Lebanon." However, tragedy followed on 18 April 1980 when Pte Thomas Barrett (30) was one of two Irish soldiers disarmed and murdered by the DFF, in the wake of the fighting for At-Tiri.

By 1983, nearly 1200 members of the battalion had served on UN Peacekeeping missions. The Battalion was kept busy on home service also; the ATCP commitment continued, for example the permanent military guard on Mount Gabriel radar station following a terrorist attack in 1982, and the deployment of personnel to Leitrim in December 1983 to assist in the large scale search for kidnapped supermarket executive Don Tidey. The battalion provided security during the visit of US President Ronald Reagan in 1984 and was also deployed in support of the operation to recover wreckage and human remains in the wake of the Air India disaster in 1985.

In November 1987, a company was deployed to the border a short notice to participate in Operation Mallard, an intensive search operation for PIRA arms dumps.

In November 1991, Cpl Michael McCarthy (33) from Buttevant was killed in action by the DFF near At-Tiri. By the late nineties, the ATCP commitment was easing. Members of the battalion continued to serve with Peacekeeping forces including Iran/Iraq, Cambodia, Ethiopia, Liberia, East Timor, and Kosovo.

=== Recent history ===
The 4th Battalion was deployed for emergencies such as the 2009 Cork floods and the severe winters of 2009/2010. It was also involved in the security operation for the state visit by Queen Elizabeth II in 2011, and provided the guard of honour for the Queen on her departure from Cork Airport. It then provided security for Barack Obama’s visit during his presidency.

In November 2012, the 4th Infantry Battalion was disbanded as part of a Defence Forces reorganisation, the remnants were incorporated into other low strength units within the Irish Army.

== Bibliography ==
- O'Reilly, Terrence (September 2019). "4 Infantry Battalion". digital.jmpublishing.ie. An Cosantóir.
- O'Reilly, Terrence (27 February 2020). "Quick march, into the record books:The night Cork soldiers made history". echolive.ie. The Echo.
