= National Security Committee (Ireland) =

Government of Ireland National Security Committee

Committee overview
- Formed: 1974
- Committee executive: John Callinan, Secretary General to the Government and Department of the Taoiseach, Chair
- Parent department: Department of the Taoiseach

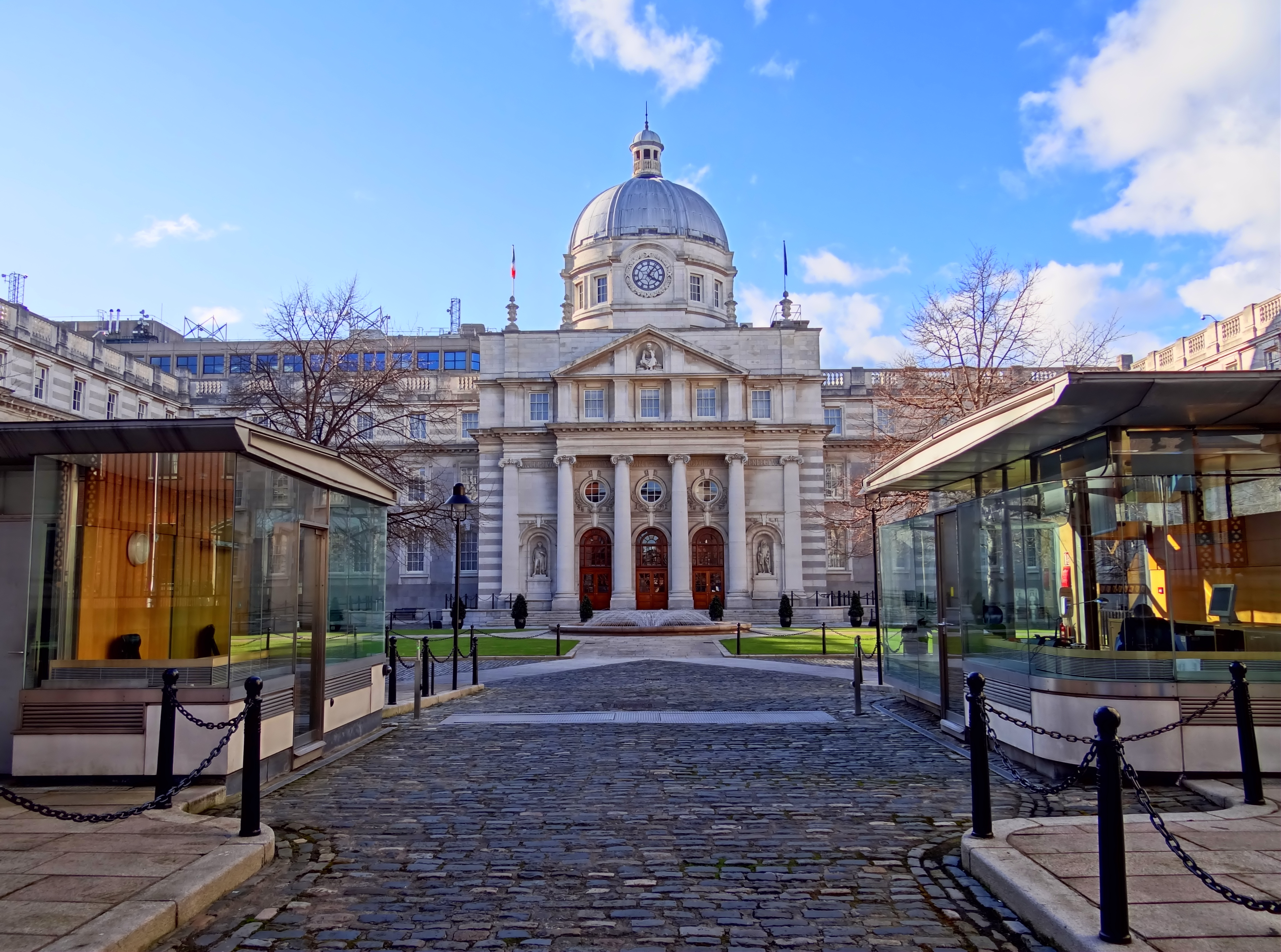
The National Security Committee meets at Government Buildings in Dublin

The National Security Committee (NSC) of Ireland is a secretive inter-departmental committee responsible for ensuring that the Taoiseach and Government of Ireland are kept informed of high-level national security, intelligence and defence issues, and the state's response to them.

The National Security Committee is chaired by the Secretary General to the Irish Government/Secretary General of the Department of the Taoiseach, and comprises; the Commissioner of the Garda Síochána, the Secretary General of the Department of Justice, Home Affairs and Migration, the Chief of Staff of the Defence Forces, the Secretary General of the Department of Defence, and the Secretary General of the Department of Foreign Affairs. The Revenue Commissioners, and the Department of Transport also have intelligence roles, but are not full members of the NSC.

The NSC meets on a regular scheduled basis and convenes additionally when required. The Taoiseach's office is responsible for calling meetings of the NSC. It was established in 1974 tasked with advising the Taoiseach and cabinet on high-level security issues. The committee receives threat assessments from the Garda Commissioner and the Chief of Staff, and reviews the overall security situation in the domestic and international environment. The Minister for Defence receives monthly intelligence, state security and defence briefings from the Director of Military Intelligence.

== Members ==
Structure of the Irish National Security Committee
| Chair | Secretary General to the Government of Ireland |
| Statutory Attendees | Secretary General of the Department of Justice, Home Affairs and Migration; Commissioner of the Garda Síochána; Secretary General of the Department of Defence; Chief of Staff of the Defence Forces; Secretary General of the Department of Foreign Affairs |
| Intelligence Advisor | Director of Military Intelligence |
| Regular Attendees | Revenue Commissioners; Department of Climate, Energy and the Environment; Department of Transport |

== Terrorism threat level ==
The constituents of the National Security Committee deliberate on Ireland's International Terror Threat Level. Five levels are used to grade the international threat of a terrorist attack to Ireland; low, moderate, substantial, severe and critical. The gradings are based on a series of factors, including information supplied by international authorities. The threat level is administered by the Garda Síochána.

International Terror Threat Level:

- Low – An attack is deemed unlikely.
- Moderate – An attack is possible, but not likely.
- Substantial – An attack is a strong possibility.
- Severe – An attack is highly likely.
- Critical – An attack is imminent.

The International Terror Threat Level was raised from low to moderate following the January 2015 Île-de-France attacks.

== National Civil Aviation Security Committee ==
The National Civil Aviation Security Committee (NCASC) is a standing committee established in 1974. The purpose of the NCASC is to advise the Irish government and civil aviation industry of security policy for civil aviation, to recommend and review security measures at airports and to co-ordinate the various interests involved. The National Civil Aviation Security Committee meets at a minimum biannually. The NCASC comprises senior representatives of government departments, Irish airports, Irish airlines, the Garda Síochána, the Defence Forces, An Post, Customs & Excise (Revenue), the Irish Aviation Authority (IAA), and the Irish Airline Pilots Association (IALPA). The committee was established under the National Civil Aviation Security Programme (NCASP) which is classified on security grounds, and therefore the deliberations of the committee are confidential.

== Continuity of government ==
The National Security Committee is the conduit for officials to communicate with the Taoiseach and/or cabinet members if their minister – the normal channel – became unavailable (or was killed). In preparation for such extreme events drafts of emergency powers legislation have been drawn up in secret by officials from the Department of Justice, including legislation to deal with circumstances such as an attack on cabinet involving numerous deaths.

== Government Security Committee ==
In July 2017, a new Government Security Committee designated Cabinet Committee F (named after the room in which it held its first meeting) was established. Chaired by Taoiseach Leo Varadkar, the new committee is modelled on the British government COBRA crisis management committee with the aim of bringing together more senior cabinet-level ministers on matters of state security. Its inaugural meeting was attended by the Tánaiste; the Minister of State at the Department of Defence; Ministers and senior officials from the Departments of Justice, Home Affairs and Migration; Defence; Enterprise, Tourism and Employment; Finance and Public Expenditure, Infrastructure, Public Service Reform and Digitalisation; Foreign Affairs and Trade; Health; Housing, Local Government and Heritage; Climate, Energy and the Environment; and Transport, where senior Defence Forces and Garda officers briefed them on the international terrorism threat.

== See also ==
- Director of Military Intelligence (Ireland)
- Office of Emergency Planning (OEP)
