= A. J. Potter =

Irish composer

Archibald James Potter (22 September 1918 – 5 July 1980) was an Irish composer and teacher, who wrote hundreds of works including operas, a mass, and four ballets, as well as orchestral and chamber music.

== Early years ==
Potter was born in Belfast to a Presbyterian family who, oddly, lived on the Falls Road, a republican (Catholic) stronghold. His father was a church organist and piano tuner who was blind since childhood. His mother was, in Potter's own words, "a raging alcoholic". The young Potter escaped a rather grim childhood when he went to live with an aunt in Kent, England.

Possessed of a good voice and natural musical ability, Potter was accepted as a treble by the world-famous choir of All Saints, Margaret Street. In 1933, after four years as a chorister, he was sent to Clifton College, Bristol. From there he went to the Royal College of Music on a scholarship and studied composition under Vaughan Williams. While at the Royal College he won the Cobbett prize for chamber music.

World War II interrupted Potter's music education, and he left college to serve with the London Irish Rifles in Europe and the Far East. After the war Potter settled in Dublin, where he continued his studies at Trinity College Dublin, gaining a Doctorate in Music in 1953.

== Life and career ==
Potter had already started composing chamber and vocal music before the war. Now, established in Dublin, he chose the orchestra as his principal means of expression. His early pieces, such as Rhapsody under a High Sky and Overture to a Kitchen Comedy, showed that Potter had absorbed Vaughan Williams' pastoral style and his love of folk music. In 1952, both pieces were awarded Radio Éireann's "Carolan Prize" for orchestral composition by the adjudicator Arnold Bax. A year later Potter repeated this success when his Concerto da Chiesa, a concerto for piano and orchestra, also won the Carolan Prize.

In 1955 Potter was appointed Professor of Composition at the Royal Irish Academy of Music, where he became an effective administrator and teacher.

In the 1960s, Potter turned to ballet, writing four orchestral scores for the Cork Ballet company. The first of these, Careless Love, became the composer's own favourite of all his compositions. Several years later, following a successful battle with alcoholism, he wrote what some regard as his magnum opus, Sinfonia "de Profundis" (1969). The première was given at the Gaiety Theatre, Dublin on 23 March 1969 in a performance by the RTÉ Symphony Orchestra under the baton of Albert Rosen. The Irish Times referred to the concert as a "major national event". In December 1969, Potter received a Jacob's Award for the composition.

Potter's last substantial work, an opera entitled The Wedding, received its first public performance in Dublin in 1981, almost a year after the composer's death.

In 1984, some of his music was used in the RTÉ television series Caught in a Free State, notably his arrangements of Finnegan’s Wake and Rosc Catha na Mumhan.

== Death ==
Potter died suddenly at his home in Greystones, County Wicklow at the age of 61. His body is buried in the nearby Redford cemetery.

== Selected works ==
Stage

- Careless Love, ballet, libretto: Donagh MacDonagh (1959)
- Gamble, No Gamble, ballet, libretto: Patrick Kavanagh (1961)
- Caitlin Bhocht, ballet, libretto: Patricia Ryan (1963)
- Full Moon for the Bride, ballet, libretto: Micheál Mac Liammóir (1964; orch. 1974)
- Patrick, television opera, libretto: Donagh MacDonagh (1964)
- The Wedding, opera, libretto: A. J. Potter (1979)

Orchestra

- Overture to a Kitchen Comedy (1950)
- Rhapsody Under a High Sky (1950)
- Concerto da Chiesa for piano and orchestra (1952)
- Fantasia Gaelach No. 1 (1952)
- Aiste O na Gleannta: Rhapsody on Corrymeela (1953)
- Variations on a Popular Tune (1955)
- Finnegan's Wake (1957, revised 1970)
- Fantasia Eireannach (1957)
- Irish Rhapsody for violin and orchestra (1963)
- Hunters Holiday. Concertino for horn and orchestra (1964)
- Fantasy for clarinet and strings (1965)
- Spanish Point. Concertino for guitar and orchestra (1965)
- Rhapsody for the End of the Day for violin and orchestra (1966)
- Tuama an dragúinín. Concerto for double bass and orchestra (1966)
- Concerto for Orchestra (1967)
- Concertino Benino for trumpet and orchestra (1967)
- Binneadtin Beil. Concertino for harmonica and orchestra (1967)
- Ceithre fichid lá. Concertino for cello and orchestra (1968)
- Sinfonia de Profundis (Symphony No. 1) (1969)
- A Hundred Thousand Welcomes for orchestra (1972-4)
- Symphony No. 2 (1976)
- The Grey Dog of the Sea. Concertino for cor anglais and orchestra (1977)
- An Trumpa Mor. Trombone concertino (1978)

Choral

- The Voice of the Rising for chorus and orchestra (1966)
- The Cornet of Horse for contralto, male chorus and orchestra (1975)
- Four Petrarch Sonnets for mixed choir SATB (1979)

Brass/military band

- Finnegan's Wake (1970)
- Irish March and Trio (1972)
- Clare Rhapsody (1978)
- Catstone Cassation (1979)
- Trombones at Templemore (1979)
- Phoenix Park (1979)
- Salala's Castle (1980)

Chamber music

- Fantasie No. 1, for string quartet (c.1937)
- Fantasie No. 2, for string quartet (c.1938)
- Fugue, for string trio (1938)
- String Quartet (1938)
- A House Full of Harpers: Concerto Grosso, for 2 concert harps and 12 Irish harps (1963)
- Céad mile bienvenues, for brass septet (1972)
- Hail to the Glasshouse, for brass quartet (1976)
- Arklow Quartet, for brass quartet (1977)
- Quartet, for four trombones (1979)

Solo instrument

- Scherzo, for piano (1936)
- Nocturne, for piano (1936)
- Suite for Solo Piano (1965)
- Étude bitonal (1968), for Irish harp

Songs for voice and piano

- The Violet (Walter Scott) (1932)
- Pippa's Song (Robert Browning) (1932)
- The Hag (Robert Herrick) (1935)
- Six Songs from The Glens of Antrim (Moira O'Neill) (1949)
- Ode to Dives (Hilaire Belloc) (1956)
- Song Suite (Sidney Bell) (1958)
- The End of the Day (W. B. Yeats) (c.1973)
- Nancy Brown (Lee McMaster = A. J. Potter) (1974)
- Homage to Belloc (H. Belloc) (1976)
- Corner of My Heart(L. McMaster) (1977)
- En passant par la Guyenne (Yvonne Bonnin-Hauterre) (1979)

== Recordings ==
- Dreaming (features Nocturne in A Minor for piano), Anew NEWD 406 (CD, 1994)
- Romantic Ireland (features Rhapsody under a High Sky), Marco Polo 8.223804 (CD, 1996)
- Sinfonia de Profundis", Finnegan's Wake, Fantasia Gaelach No. 1, Variations on a Popular Tune, Overture to a Kitchen Comedy, Marco Polo 8.225158 (CD, 2001)
- Sinfonia de Profundis (with Seóirse Bodley's Symphony No. 3). RTE 61. (LP, 1981)
- Ceol Potter (features arrangements of traditional Irish tunes), Gael Linn CEFCD 034 (CD, 2006; re-issue of LP, 1973)

== Further references ==
- Contemporary Music Centre profile of A. J. Potter, including full list of compositions
