= 26th Infantry Battalion (Ireland) =

WWII Irish infantry battalion

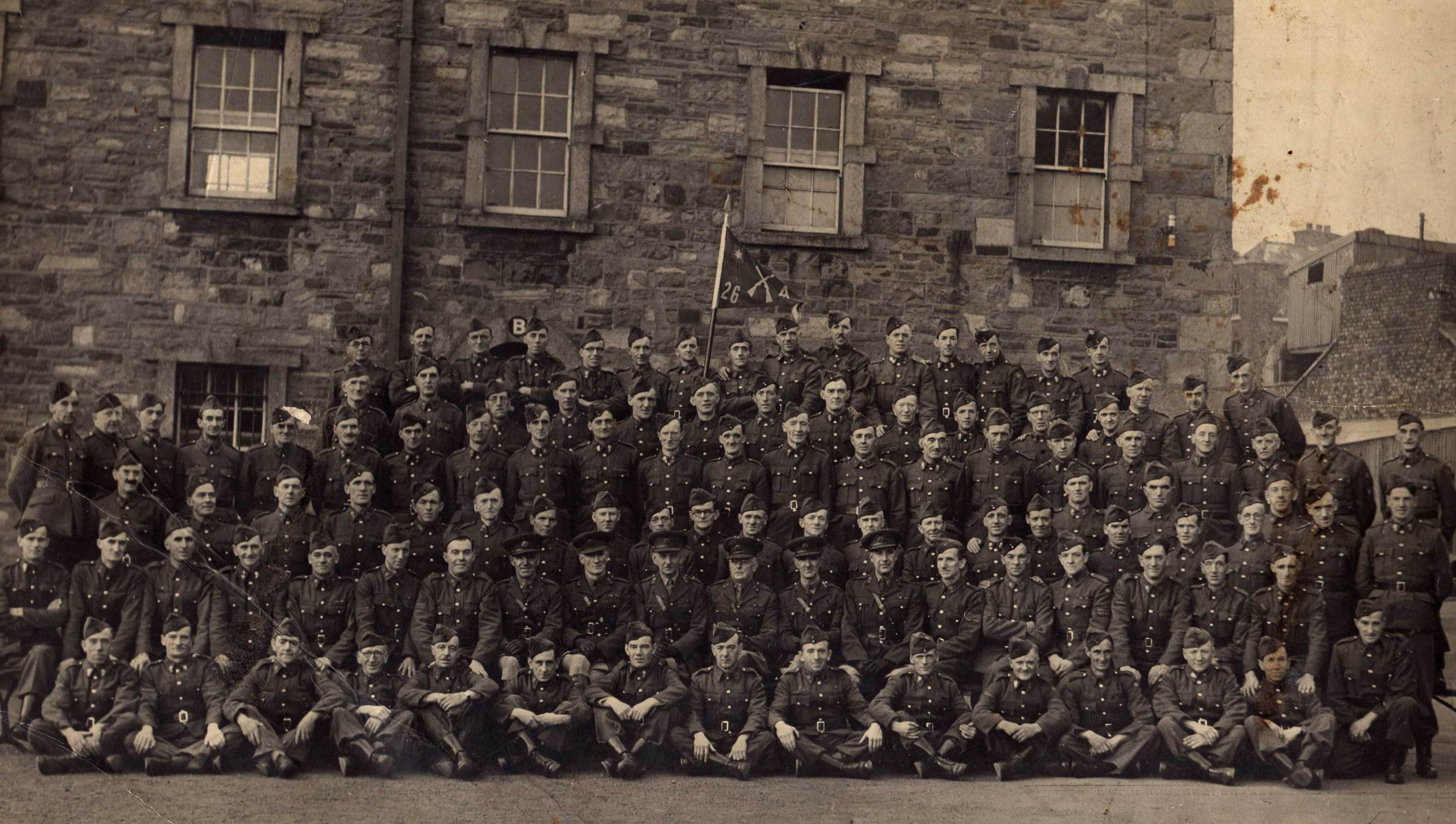
26th Infantry Battalion ("Old IRA").

The 26th Infantry Battalion (26ú Cathlán) was formed during "The Emergency" in Ireland at the time of the Second World War. This battalion was part of the second line reserve and comprised almost exclusively men who had seen active service in the War of Independence 1919–21, and some who had been out in the 1916 Rising. It was often referred to as the "Old IRA" battalion. Notably it brought together members of the pro and anti- treaty factions who had fought during the Irish Civil War.

== Officers ==
Its first commanding officer was Patrick ("Paddy") Holahan (also misspelled as Holohan). Commandant Holahan was later transferred from the 26th to the regular Army (O.C. 1st Battalion Construction Corps). Frank Henderson became the new O.C. of the 26th. He subsequently resigned due to ill health and was succeeded by Paddy Rigney, with Captain Joe O'Connor as second-in-command.

== Recognition ==
There is little online reference to the 26th Battalion and their activities during The Emergency. One non-military reference is to a show called "Signal Fires" at the Theatre Royal during Easter Week 1943.

== Medal series ==
A medal series was instituted on 6 October 1944, but not issued until after the cessation of hostilities when production and issue commenced in 1947.

== See also ==
- Infantry Corps (Ireland)
