= Irish competition law =

Irish Competition Law is the Irish body of legal rules designed to ensure fairness and freedom in the marketplace. The main (but not the only) purpose of Irish competition law is to enhance consumer welfare. The key provisions of Irish competition law: (a) usually outlaw anti-competitive arrangements between businesses and economic operators (known as "undertakings"); (b) always outlaw the abuse of dominance by undertakings; (c) control certain mergers, acquisitions and joint ventures; and (d) control certain activities in the grocery sector.

Irish competition law is primarily statute-based with some judge-made rules (the so-called "common law"). The statute rules are embodied primarily in the Competition Act 2002 (which replaced the Competition Acts 1991-1996), the Competition (Amendment) Act 2006; the Competition (Amendment) Act 2012; and the Competition and Consumer Protection Act 2014.

Irish competition law is comparable to, but quite different in certain key respects, from European Union competition law. There are some similarities to the antitrust law of the United States of America but the differences (particularly in relation to merger control, abuse of dominance and the way in which breaches are punished) are substantial. So it is best to see Irish competition law as sui generis. For example, the Irish competition agency (the Competition and Consumer Protection Commission (the "CCPC")) may not impose fines while many competition agencies worldwide may do so.

Irish competition law is enforced by the courts (which have the power to find breaches, permit unannounced visits by the CCPC) and impose penalties), the CCPC (which has the power to institute investigations and take court actions) and private action by "aggrieved persons" (the latter do not have to be undertakings). Unlike many other competition agencies (such as the [European Commission]), the CCPC does not, and may not, have the power to impose fines; this is due to the Irish Constitution which limits the power to impose penalties and sanctions to the judicial system (i.e., the courts); some would argue that Irish competition law is a better system for having the filter of the CCPC having to make its case to the police (the Garda Siochana) and the Director of Public Prosecutions before cases are instituted with the extra protection of the judges and, in criminal cases, juries acting as a filter to ensure robust cases are taken.

== Relationship with EU Competition Law ==
Irish competition law, Irish law must not contradict or inhibit the operation of EC law, but it may outlaw things which are legal under EU law, or punish breaches more severely. It also exercises a persuasive force over the jurisprudence of Irish competition law. Due to the requirement of compliance with EU law and the similar understanding and goals, Irish Courts will examine cases and precedents in the European Courts to see how it has been interpreted or to ensure that they are consistent. EU competition law has jurisdiction over cases which affect inter-state trade in the Union.

Regulation 1/2003 of the European Commission "decentralised" the enforcement of competition law with a number of reforms designed to increase the enforcement of EC rules in national courts.

The Irish competition law is based on the European Union competition law. Irish law cannot conflict with or prevent the application of EU law; it may outlaw acts that are authorised in EU legislation or provide stiffer penalties in case of violation. The EU competition law has jurisdiction over cases that involve trade between member states. In a case where either Article 101 or 102 TFEU is involved, the Irish authorities and courts must guarantee alignment with EU principles and case law.

Irish jurisprudence is also influenced by the impact of EU competition law. Since there is a requirement of consequentiality with the EU legislature and the objectives are generally the same, the courts of Ireland will often give attention to the interpretation taken by the Court of Justice of the European Union when interpreting the Irish legislation of similar competencies to the EU competition legislation. This will provide consistency in implementing competition policy within the member states. Articles 101 and 102 TFEU The EU competition law is decentralised by Regulation 1/2003, allowing national competition authorities and courts to apply Articles 101 and 102 TFEU directly.

In Ireland, the Competition and Consumer Protection Commission is a member of the European Competition Network, which also works with the European Commission and other authorities in national jurisdictions in matters concerning cross-border trade or conduct that has consequences in more than one Member State.

This framework becomes especially applicable in markets with a platform and digital nature, where online marketplaces like Alibaba and multi-sided platform activity can produce effects both inside Ireland and in incorporated EU jurisdiction. Complementary EU law, such as the Digital Markets Act, is a subset of the overarching regulatory framework in which the Irish competition law operates, but does not imply any particular determination by the law.

== Enforcement ==
The law is primarily enforced by the Competition and Consumer Protection Commission (which replaced the Irish Competition Authority on 31 October 2014), who review mergers, and investigate cartels and abuse of dominance by undertakings. They can fine offenders, when can be appealed to the High Court. Private enforcement is also possible. An aggrieved party may sue the offender for damages under the Competition Act. However this facility has not been exercised much, possibly due to the difficulty of gathering evidence to prove such a breach. Regulation 1/2003 of the European Commission sought to increase private and public enforcement of EC rules in national courts to allow the commission to concentrate on bigger cases.

The CCPC operates a Cartel Immunity Programme which allows for immunity or leniency in sentencing for offenders which supply information to them that allows the prosecution of other breaches of the law. The rule mirrors the European Commission's Leniency policy.

Irish competition law also regulates certain mergers, acquisitions and joint ventures. Part III of the Competition Act 2002 provides that the Competition Authority must approve transactions which fall within the scope of Part III before they may be lawfully implemented.

Ireland has achieved considerable success in enforcing competition law by virtue of successful criminal prosecutions against various individuals and companies. It has almost thirty convictions for competition law breaches including jury convictions for cartel-related activity.

Irish competition law is enforced by the Competition and Consumer Protection Commission and (where the conduct in question involves trade between Member States) uses Articles 101 and 102 of the TFEU in conjunction with EU institutions via the European Competition Network.

== See also ==
- List of acts of the Oireachtas
