= Office of Emergency Planning (Ireland) =

The Office of Emergency Planning (OEP) is a civil/military body within Ireland's Department of Defence responsible for the co-ordination and oversight of emergency planning between state agencies. It is answerable to the Minister for Defence.

== Structure ==
The Office of Emergency Planning was established in 2001 to oversee Ireland's emergency planning process. The OEP encompasses both civil and military staff and is located in the Department of Defence Headquarters. The OEP chairs the Government Task Force Subgroups on Emergency Planning. These subgroups comprise senior officials representing government departments and public authorities with support roles in the state's emergency plans. The Government Task Force on Emergency Planning charges the subgroups with carrying out specific studies and developing particular aspects of emergency planning. The subgroups are the means by which expertise is shared between different government departments and public authorities on emergency planning. Their role is to minimise the potential consequences of any given emergency.

Major emergencies in Ireland are categorised under;

- Severe weather
- Flooding
- Chemical spills
- Transport accidents (air, sea, rail, road)
- Accidents at sea
- Major pollution incidents at sea
- Bomb explosions, terrorism and suspicious packages
- Nuclear incidents
- Influenza pandemic
- Animal disease outbreak

== Government Task Force on Emergency Planning ==
The Government Task Force on Emergency Planning was formed following the September 11 attacks in 2001 on the United States. The Task Force is the top-level structure which gives policy and direction to the Office of Emergency Planning, and which coordinates and oversees the emergency planning activities of all government departments and public authorities. The Minister for Defence chairs this Government Task Force, which includes Ministers, senior officials of government departments, senior officers of the Defence Forces, the Garda Síochána and officials of other key public authorities which have a lead or support role in the government's emergency planning.

== Emergency Planning subgroups ==
- Interdepartmental Group on Emergency Planning
- Emergency Planning subgroup on National Risk Assessment
- Emergency Planning subgroup on Roles & Responsibilities
- Emergency Planning subgroup on CBRN
- Emergency Planning subgroup on Severe Weather Events
- Emergency Planning subgroup on Communications & Flooding
- Emergency Planning subgroup on Electricity Contingency Planning
- National Steering Group on Major Emergency Management
- National Emergency Planning Group on Nuclear Accidents (NEPNA)

== See also ==
- National Security Committee (NSC)
- Radiological Protection Institute of Ireland (RPII)
- National Cyber Security Centre (NCSC)
- Civil Defence Ireland
