= 65th Reserve Infantry Battalion (Ireland) =

65th Reserve Infantry Battalion Ireland
- 65th Infantry Battalion insignia
- Active: 2005—2013
- Country: Ireland
- Branch: Reserve Defence Forces
- Type: Infantry
- Size: Battalion
- Part of: 2nd (Eastern) Brigade; Reserve Defence Forces
- Garrison/HQ: McKee Barracks, Dublin
- Colours: Yellow & Purple

Commanders
- Current commander: Comdt J. Cremin 2006-
- Notable commanders: M. Delaney 2005-2006

The 65th Reserve Infantry Battalion (65 Res Inf Bn, or 65 Bn) was an infantry battalion of Ireland's Reserve Defence Forces from 2005 to 2012.

== Unit heritage ==
65 Bn was formed on 1 October 2005 as part of the reorganisation of the Reserve Defence Forces, when the former 7th Infantry Battalion of the Irish Army's second-line reserve, the Fórsa Cosanta Áitiúil (FCA), was abolished. A new Army Reserve unit was then formed up as 65 Res Inf Bn in a ceremony at McKee Barracks. The Battalion provided troops for ceremonial events including the 1916 Anniversary Commemoration Parade and National Day of Commemoration. 65 Bn took part in a number of training exercises.

In 2013, after 8 years of service, 65 Bn was stood down on Easter Sunday as part of the reorganisation of the Defence Forces, with its members redeployed to units of the 7th Infantry Battalion.

== Locations and operations ==
The Battalion was composed of a Headquarters Company, three rifle Companies A, B and C and a Support Company. The Battalion was spread across north Dublin with HQ and Support Company based in McKee Barracks, A Company in Swords, B Company in Navan and C Company in Kells. 65 Bn linked directly to the 5th Infantry Battalion who were also based in McKee Barracks.
