= Günther Schütz =

German spy in Ireland during WW2

Günther Schütz (17 April 1912 – 1991) was a German citizen who worked for German Intelligence (Abwehr) during World War II. During the war he was deployed to Ireland, but after parachuting to the wrong location he was apprehended by Irish police. Except during one failed escape attempt, he spent the rest of the war in prison,

== Early life ==
Schütz was born on 17 April 1912 in the Silesian town of Schweidnitz. He was born into a prosperous upper-middle-class family which owned a metal manufacturing business.

== Military career ==
He had served in the local army reserve unit from 1934–1935 and later attended a five-week training course with the 2/58 Mounted Artillery Regiment at Oldenburg in 1938. From 1938–1939 Schütz attended the German Commercial College at Eaton Rise, Ealing, in London and also acted for the Abwehr while in Britain.

=== Abwehr ===
His selection for Abwehr training took place when on home leave in Christmas 1938, he had been asked to attend the Hamburg Ast. and on arrival had been introduced to Hauptmann Dr. Friedrich Karl Praetorius, the senior officer in the economic section of Abwehr I. He was asked not to be a spy but to do his 'patriotic duty' and to keep his eyes open. He was expected to send reports on the economic and industrial situation around him to an address in Hamburg. Schütz agreed and returned to Britain as a representative of Remy & Co., an Abwehr front company.

Schütz travelled the country taking pictures of factories, bringing with him a Portuguese man called Pierce who also shared the building where he lived. Schütz attempted to recruit Pierce and he agreed to work for the Abwehr. Pierce also went to MI5 and was asked to act as a double agent called "RAINBOW", with an MI5 handler based in Antwerp. The Abwehr asked Pierce to assess bomb damage from IRA S-Plan attacks, report on internal transport facilities and British air defences. Pierce did so but in his capacity as RAINBOW he fed the Abwehr faulty information until June 1943.

Schütz returned to Germany in August 1939 and was immediately activated for military service. He was assigned to Abwehrstelle I/Wi Generalkommando Hamburg, the branch dealing with economic espionage. As a cover, Schütz was posted to the 'translator company' for Wehrkreis X. From December 1939 he carried out a variety of tasks for Abwehr I/Wi in particular visiting Belgium, Italy and Switzerland primarily to collect letters from live-letter drops sent by German agents overseas. He was also sent to Spain periodically from June 1940 and during this period acted as handler for agent Werner Unland. In December 1940, Schütz was recalled to Hamburg and told about a mission to Ireland. His mission would be to collect and send weather information (desired by Abwehr section I-L Air Intelligence), observe British convoy traffic (for Abwehr section I-M Naval Intelligence) and conduct economic espionage against selected targets in Northern Ireland. In particular, Abwehr wanted data on the

- condition of harbours,
- the location and capacity of plants producing corn oil, margarine, soap and sugar,
- oil refineries,
- carbide works,
- oil lines and storage tanks,
- shipyard activity,
- bomb damage assessments of Luftwaffe raids,
- and the amount of food being sent from Ireland to Britain.

His mission was dependent on regular radio contact and he received training in the basics of radio transmitting. Gaelic scholar and SS officer Ludwig Mühlhausen also became involved in training Schütz. He was taught the basics of Morse code and meteorology and was the first agent sent to Ireland with the new microdot system. He was given £1,000 sterling and $3,200 US, some of which was counterfeit. In the event of trouble Schütz was to contact the German Legation for assistance. He was also to give some of his money to two Abwehr agents, Werner Unland, and Johannes Ernstberger who remained on an Abwehr retainer.

== Mission ==
Schütz's mission to Ireland was cancelled in July 1940, but rescheduled in September 1940. In preparation for his mission he met with Oscar Pfaus and requested some Irish contact names. This request was denied by the Abwehr who made it clear to Schütz that he was not to contact the IRA for any reason. On 5 March 1941 his first attempt to parachute into Ireland failed when his transport He 111 was forced to return to base in Amsterdam. One week later he parachuted again, but was dropped into the wrong location in Ireland. The planned dropzone was Newbridge near Dublin; but he was dropped 100 mi (160 km) away near the Taghmon, a village in County Wexford. He was spotted and reported to the Garda Síochána. After his arrest, police found a transmitter, money, a microscope and a bottle of German cognac in his case. Schütz immediately confessed to the police he was an Abwehr agent. He was initially sent to The Bridewell (former barracks of the Royal Irish Constabulary) in Cork before being transferred to Arbour Hill Prison on 15 March 1941.

During his interrogation by Irish Military Intelligence (G2) he was told about the German agents Wilhelm Preetz and Walter Simon who had also been caught; it was a sign of his unpreparedness that he was entirely unaware of these men. Through the interrogation of Schütz, G2 were able to arrest Unland although they were already aware of his activities in Dublin.

== Internment, escape and the IRA ==
German Intelligence internees were held in a number of locations throughout "The Emergency" – Sligo Gaol, Arbour Hill Prison, Mountjoy Gaol, The Bridewell and Custume Barracks, Athlone. Although three of them, Görtz, Tributh and Gärtner (Operation Mainau and Operation Lobster I) were serving members of the Wehrmacht, they were deemed enough of a security threat to be separated from the regular prison population.

Schütz was to make two efforts to escape from captivity. The first involved digging a tunnel from Mountjoy Gaol with the help of Dutch internee Jan van Loon, but it failed after the tunnel filled with water. The second was more successful and involved enlisting the help of the IRA through internee Jim O'Hanlon, who gave Schütz his own address and those of several other volunteers. Schütz made his escape attempt on 15 February 1942 and reached the house of Jim's brother, Joe O'Hanlon.

From this point on he was sheltered and protected by the IRA, first by O'Hanlon, then by Caitlin Brugha in Rathmines. Brugha wanted Schütz to re-establish contact with the Abwehr and facilitate a resupply of arms, ammunition and money to the IRA.

Through Mrs Brugha's contacts Schütz met with the representatives of the "Northern Group", the Belfast IRA who had taken over the organisation following the arrest of Stephen Hayes on charges of treason. The men explained to Schütz that they had a plan; they wanted communications equipment, arms, ammunition and money to rebuild the IRA.

In exchange they would arrange for Schütz to leave Ireland and arrive in occupied France. These arrangements were made directly with the new IRA Adjutant General Eoin McNamee and another IRA member who is presumed to have been Seán McCool. The intended skipper of the vessel that was to take Schütz to France was IRA volunteer and Irish Naval Service Captain Charles McGuinness. The departure was planned for 30 April 1942. McGuinness was collected and taken to the vessel at Bray just south of Dublin, but the house where Schütz was staying was raided and Schütz was taken into custody by Irish Special Branch.

The irony is that when they raided the property, the detectives were looking for Nóinín Brugha, not for Schütz.

Schütz was returned to the Bridewell and thence to Arbour Hill, where his room, which had once housed Éamon de Valera, had a carpet and radio. He sat out the remainder of the war in prison.

== Life after "The Emergency" ==
Schütz was put on the list for deportation after the war ended, but he married Irish citizen Una Mackey on 1 May 1947. By this time he was on permanent parole and had a flat in Haddington Road, Dublin. He had also begun a small business making desk lamps. He appeared at the aliens' office at the same time that Hermann Görtz committed suicide and following this was flown from Baldonnel to Frankfurt. He was taken to a US Army interrogation camp near Oberursel but was released soon after. He and his wife began all over again in Hamburg and he took up his desk lamps business again. He successfully established his own import/export business and eventually moved back to Ireland in the 1960s. For some years he ran a hotel in County Wicklow and eventually retired to his home in Avoca. He died in his sleep in Shankill, Dublin, 1991.

RTÉ made a dramatised television series on German spies in Ireland ("Caught in a Free State") in 1983. One of the four episodes focused on Günther Schütz (in which he was played by the German actor Goetz Burger).

== See also ==
- IRA Abwehr World War II – main article on IRA Nazi links
- Northern Campaign (IRA)

== Further information ==
- Extensive records exist for Schütz in the Irish Military Academy records.
- Mark M. Hull, Irish Secrets. German Espionage in Wartime Ireland 1939–1945, 2003, ISBN 0-7165-2756-1
- Enno Stephan, Spies in Ireland, 1963, OCLC 1349261 ASIN B0000CLX8F
- J Bowyer Bell, The Secret Army – The IRA 1997 3rd Edition, ISBN 1-85371-813-0
