= Cathal Brugha Barracks =

Irish Army barracks

- Dún Chathail Bhrugha
- Dublin, Ireland
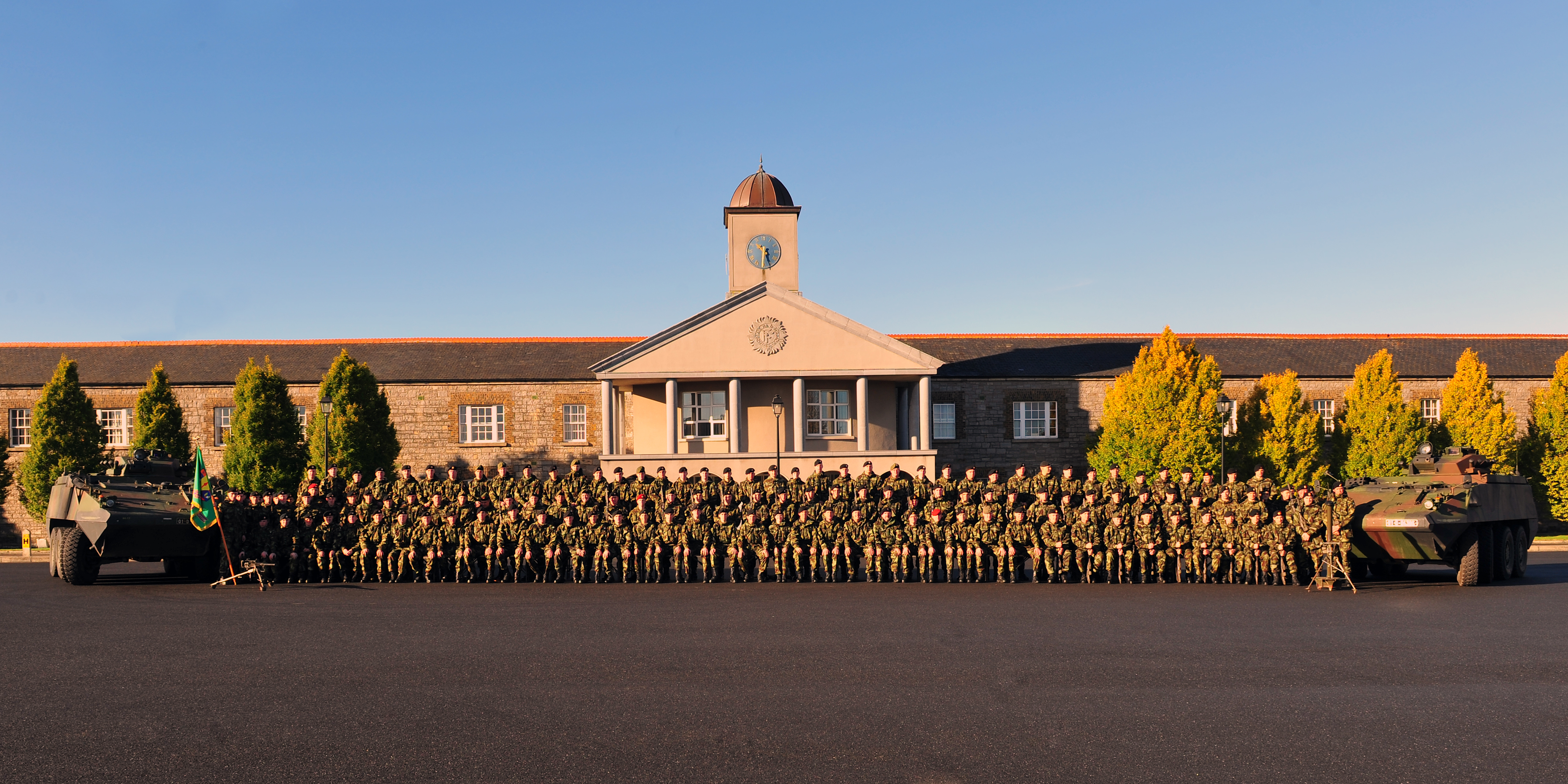
- A group photo in 2013

Site information
- Type: Barracks
- Operator: Irish Army
- Open to the public: Partial (Barracks museum and archives are open to public at certain times)

Location
- Location within Dublin
- Coordinates: 53.3270°N 6.2691°W

Site history
- Built: 1810
- Events: 1916 Easter Rising, Irish War of Independence

Garrison information
- Current commander: Brigadier General Tony Cudmore
- Garrison: 2 Brigade of Irish Army

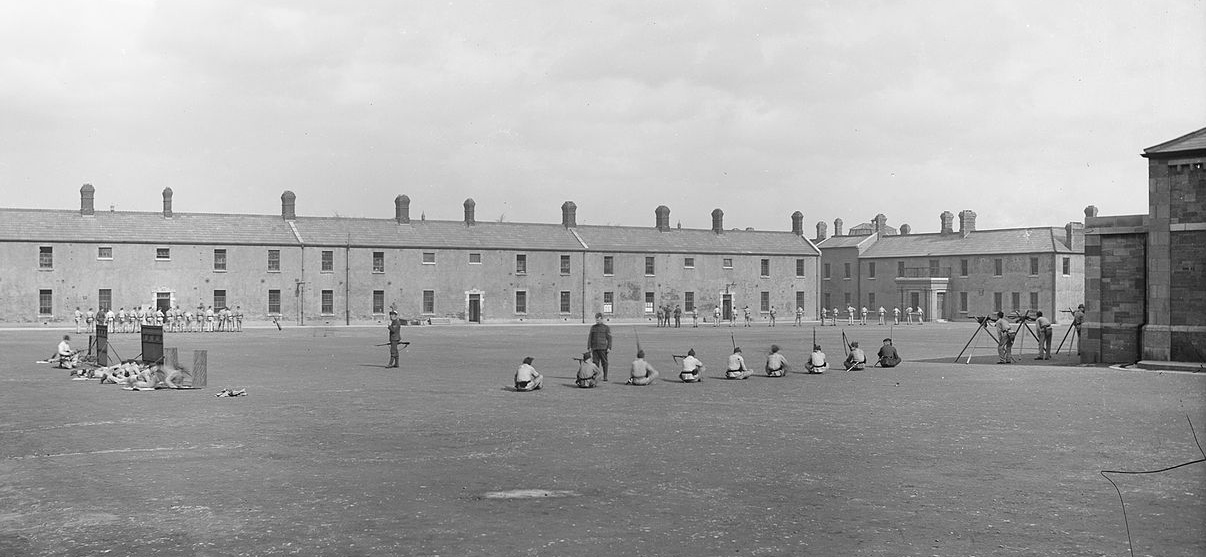
Drills on the barracks' square (then known as Portobello Barracks) early in the 20th century

Cathal Brugha Barracks (Irish: Dún Chathail Bhrugha) is an Irish Army barracks in Rathmines, Dublin. A key military base of the Irish Defence Forces, it is the headquarters of 2 Brigade, and houses the Military Archives of the Department of Defence. Originally known as Portobello Barracks, the main structures of the barracks date from the early 19th century.

== History ==
The barracks was originally constructed between 1810 and 1815, and named Portobello Barracks for the area in which it was sited. The area was named after the British victory at the Battle of Porto Bello during the War of Jenkins' Ear.

In 1817, Windham William Sadler, the son of balloonist James Sadler, set off in a hot air balloon from the grounds of the barracks landing in Holyhead in North Wales. Originally designed as a cavalry barracks, it saw some development along these lines, with additional land being purchased, and the addition of a church in 1842 and a canteen block in 1868. Edgar F. Keatinge, writing in the Dublin Historical Record in 1947, recalled his youth growing up in the vicinity of the barracks, at a time when Ireland was still part of the United Kingdom:

We children used to haunt the barracks at Portobello ... we became quite expert in the names and characteristics of the regiments quartered there. We could, for instance, knowingly distinguish the quick step of the Rifle Brigade from the more measured tread of the Surreys, and even before we were near enough to recognize them by sight, our ears told us who they were. A great thrill was a cavalry regiment and our joy was complete when the mounted bands struck up.

Troops stationed in the barracks fought during the Easter Rising and the Irish War of Independence. During the Easter Rising, three nationalist writers, including the radical Francis Sheehy-Skeffington, were summarily executed in the guardroom exercise yard on the orders of Royal Irish Rifles captain John Bowen-Colthurst. In a subsequent court-martial, Bowen-Colthurst was controversially found guilty of the murders but was also declared insane and detained indefinitely at Broadmoor Hospital.

On 17 May 1922, Irish troops took possession of the barracks and it became the National Army's Headquarters under General Michael Collins. In 1952, it was renamed after Cathal Brugha, a rebel leader during the Easter Rising who served as Minister for Defence in the First Dáil and lived in the local area for a time. Brugha, a leader in the Anti-Treaty IRA, was killed by the National Army on O'Connell Street during the Battle of Dublin.

== Current use ==
Since the end of the Irish War of Independence, the barracks has housed units of the Irish Defence Forces, and has more recently been developed as a result of the force's reorganisation. It became the Eastern Command HQ (again) in 1994. Following the 2012 reorganisation of the army, the barracks became headquarters of the reorganised 2 Brigade.

As of 2014, Cathal Brugha Barracks housed the following units:

- 2 Brigade Headquarters
- 7 Infantry Battalion
- 2 Cavalry Squadron
- 2 Brigade Field CIS Company
- 2 Brigade Military Police Company
- 2 Brigade Transport Company
- 2 Brigade Ordnance Company
- 2 Brigade Training Centre
- 2 Brigade Detachment Central Medical Unit
- Army School of Music and No 1 Army Band
- (Plus reserves units such as a CIS Radio Platoon and the Dublin Unit of the Naval Service Reserve (DUNSR))

== Literary references ==
He had a good slice of luck, Jack Mooney was telling me, over that boxing match Myler Keogh won again that soldier in the Portobello barracks. By God, he had the little kipper down in the county Carlow he was telling me

— Ulysses, Chapter 8, Lestrygonians episode, James Joyce

== See also ==
- List of Irish military installations
