= Department of Defence (Ireland) =

Irish government department

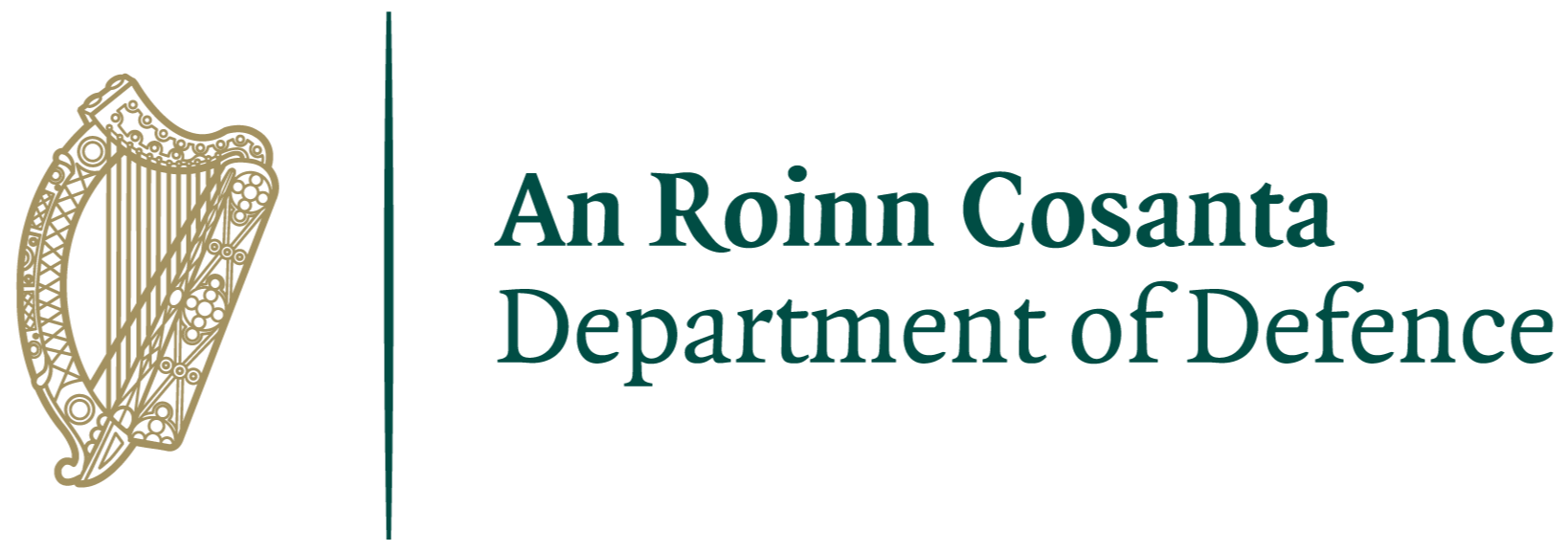

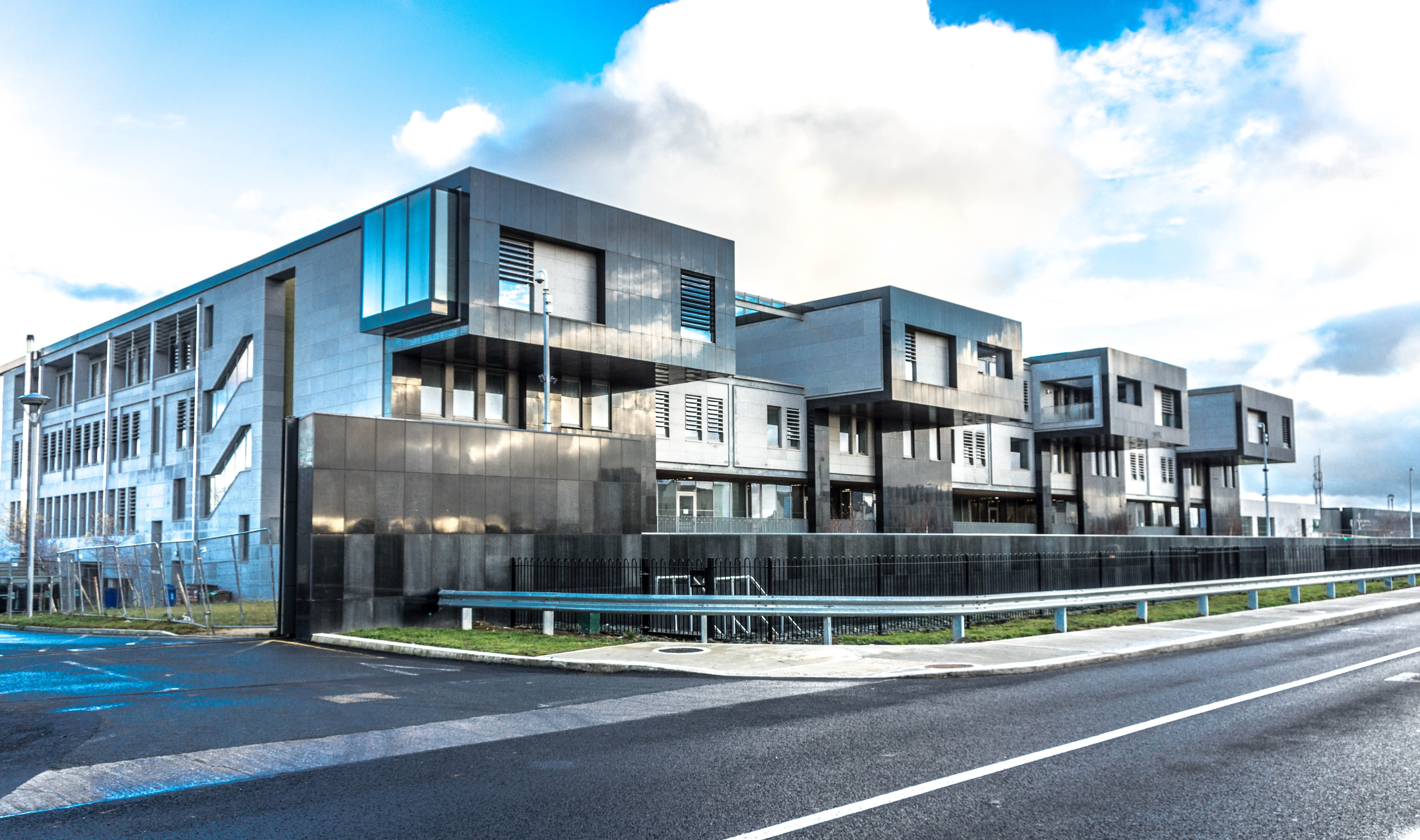
- Department of Defence headquarters

Department overview
- Formed: 22 January 1919
- Jurisdiction: Government of Ireland
- Headquarters: Station Road, Newbridge, County Kildare; 53.18042°N 6.79590°W
- Minister responsible: Helen McEntee, Minister for Defence
- Department executive: Jacqui McCrum, Secretary General
- Website: Official website

The Department of Defence (Irish: An Roinn Cosanta) is the department of the Government of Ireland that is responsible for preserving peace and security in Ireland, and administers the Irish Defence Forces. The department is led by the Minister for Defence.

== Departmental team ==
The official headquarters of the department are at Station Road, Newbridge, County Kildare. The departmental team consists of the following:

- Minister for Defence: Helen McEntee, TD
  - Minister of State at the Department of Defence: Thomas Byrne, TD
- Secretary General of the Department: Jacqui McCrum

== History ==
The Department of Defence was created at the very first meeting of Dáil Éireann on 21 January 1919. The Ministers and Secretaries Act 1924, passed soon after the establishment of the Irish Free State in 1922, provided it with a statutory basis. This act provided it with:

the administration and business of the raising, training, organisation, maintenance, equipment, management, discipline, regulation, and control according to law of the Military Defence Forces of Saorstát Eireann, and all powers, duties and functions connected with the same, and of which Department the head shall be, and shall be styled, an t-Aire Cosanta or (in English) the Minister for Defence, and shall be assisted by a Council of Defence as hereinafter provided.

The department's head office moved from Infirmary Road, to Newbridge in 2011 as part of government decentralisation.

== Structure ==
The mission of the Department of Defence is to meet the needs of Government and the public by providing value for money defence and civil defence services and by co-ordinating and overseeing the emergency planning process via the Office of Emergency Planning (OEP). The Department is also concerned with ensuring the secure and stable environment necessary for economic growth and development in Ireland. The military budget was €1.005 Billion in 2007 (estimated) and €1.354 Billion in 2010. By 2015 the budget had been cut to €885 Million and was projected to stay at that level until 2017 according to a report by the Department of Finance.

The Department oversees the operations of the Irish Defence Forces whose roles are:

- to defend the State against armed aggression; this being a contingency, preparations for its implementation will depend on an ongoing Government assessment of the security and defence environment
- to aid the civil power (meaning in practice to assist, when requested, the Garda Síochána, who have primary responsibility for law and order, including the protection of the internal security of the State)
- to participate in multinational peace support, crisis management and humanitarian relief operations in support of the United Nations and under UN mandate, including regional security missions authorised by the UN
- to provide a fishery protection service in accordance with the State's obligations as a member of the European Union
- to carry out such other duties as may be assigned to them from time to time, e.g. search and rescue, air ambulance service, Ministerial air transport service, assistance on the occasion of natural or other disasters, assistance in connection with the maintenance of essential services, assistance in combating oil pollution at sea

The Department has also had responsibility for the Irish Red Cross since 1939.

When not engaged in military operations at home or overseas, most defence organisations concentrate on training and preparation and not on the provision of non-military services. The Defence Forces have achieved very high levels of training and preparation in recent years while also providing a wide range of services to other Government Departments and agencies. The Defence Forces Training Centre at the Curragh Camp is staffed by 1,300 soldiers and 300 civilians.

Records are maintained by the Irish Military Archives.

== Relationship with Defence Forces ==
The 2020 Defence Forces Review was published for the Military Authorities by the Public Relations Section at the Chief of Staff's Branch, in academic collaboration with the Dublin City University School of Law and Government and containing the following disclaimer:

This Review contains an article examining the relationship between the Department and the Defence Forces. The article outlines the background to an apparently very high level of detailed civilian control in the military environment and contrasts this with other, reasonably similar, defence structures in Europe. Retired Senior Officers and RACO (Representative Association of Commissioned Officers) are cited as describing the relationship as variously “toxic”, “divisive” and “dismissive”. The matter was reported as being subject to an investigation ordered by the Chief of Staff.

An apparent dispute between the Department of Defence Secretary General and the Chief of Staff of the Defence Forces in relation to the release of documents under Freedom of Information Legislation was also reported in April 2021.
