= Michael Hewson =

Irish librarian (died 1992)

- Born: c. 1930; Ballynacally, County Clare, Ireland
- Died: 1992; Mater Misericordiae University Hospital, Dublin
- Occupation: librarian

Michael Hewson (c. 1930-1992) was an Irish librarian and director of the National Library of Ireland (NLI) from 1982 to 1988.

== Life and family ==
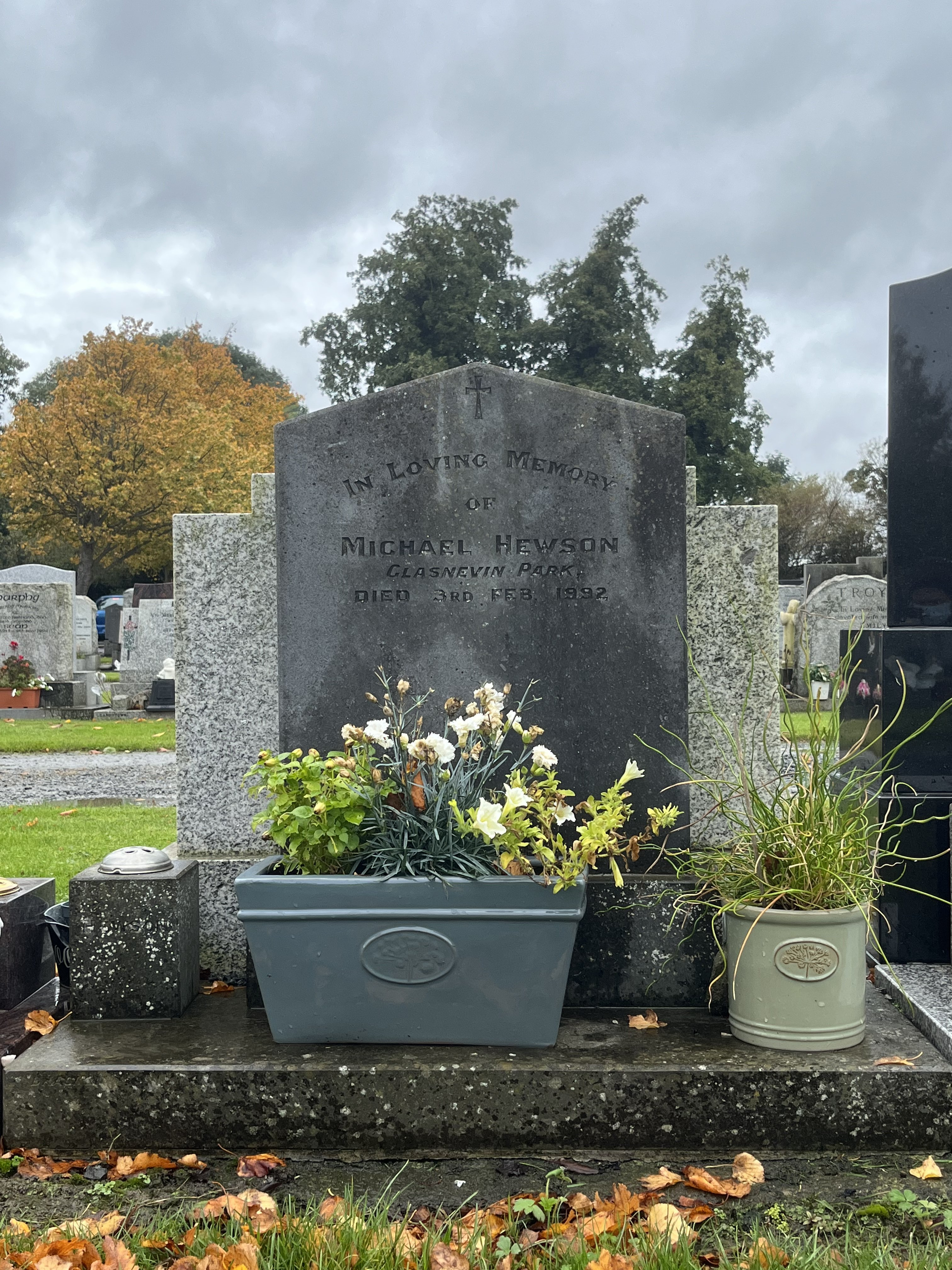
Hewson's Gravestone

Michael Hewson was born in Ballynacally, in the parish of Kilchreest, County Clare, c. 1930. His parents were John Hewson and Bridget Hewson (née Kelly) and were known to be very active in the Ballynacally community. John Hewson was a "well-known" draper, and was involved in a number of local organisations and a member of the executive committee of the Comhaltas Ceoltóirí Éireann, an organisation dedicated to the promotion of the Irish language, music, song and dance. Bridget Hewson was also a leading member of the Irish Countrywomen's Association and the Apostolic Work Society.

Hewson was the oldest of four siblings, including two sisters Mary and Marguerite. Mary joined The Missionary Sisters of the Holy Rosary, Killashandra and would later move to the United States to continue her work as a nun. He also had a brother, William. In 1949, at age 18, William and his cousin drowned while bathing off the coast of Doughmore, Doonbeg, near Kilkee, County Clare. There was an inquest held which stated that when they were found their hands were "clasped together".

Hewson was raised Roman Catholic and was educated in St Flannan's College in Ennis. He completed his Leaving Certificate in 1948 and would go on to study classics at University College Dublin.

He took up a job as an assistant librarian in Ennis public library before moving to Dublin in 1953. He took part in several leisure activities, including orienteering, mountain walking, and bridge. He also competed in four marathons, with a best time of approximately three hours. Hewson stated in an interview with The Irish Times that he believed that this was a "respectable time" for a man of his age.

While living in Dublin, he met his wife, Una. They moved to Glasnevin and had five children, two boys and three girls. Hewson died on 3 February 1992. He had continued to visit the Library as a reader, including the Saturday before he died.

He was buried in Dardistown Cemetery, Dardistown, County Dublin.

== Career ==
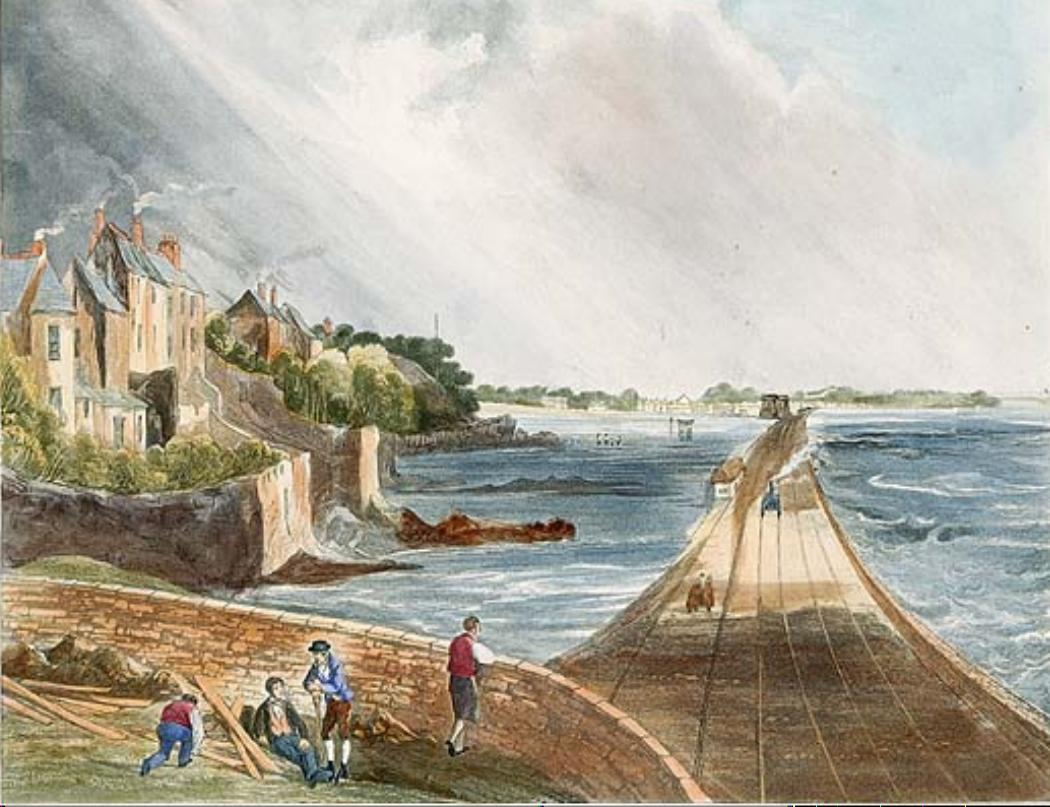
An image from Catalogue of Irish Topographical Prints and Original Drawings, by Michael Hewson and Rosalind M Elmes. Watercolour painting by John Harris Jr.: Dublin and Kingstown Railway, From Blackrock, looking across Dublin Bay towards WIlliamstown & Merrion. Dublin in the distance.

Hewson began his career as an assistant keeper in the NLI in 1953. He went on to be appointed keeper in the Department of Manuscript in 1973. In 1975, Michael Hewson published The Catalog of Irish Topographical Prints and Drawings in the National Library of Ireland. This was sponsored by the National Library of Ireland Society.

Later, in 1976, he was appointed keeper of printed books which he managed for 3 years. In 1982, he was appointed the Director of the NLI immediately after the resignation of Alf Mac Lochlainn. He also became the Honorary Secretary of the National Library of Ireland Society for a year, handing the position over to Dònall Ò Lùanaigh in 1983.

Hewson's directorship coincided with the most difficult time in the Library's history. In 1986, the government decided to change the department responsible for the Library from the Department of Education to first the Taoiseach's Department and then the Department of Arts and Culture. This resulted in issues with funding, leading to diminished staffing and shorter library hours to the point where the National Library of Ireland Society filed a motion with the Taoiseach in order for it to provide its accustomed high standard of scholarly services.

In 1985, W.B. Yeats' son donated a collection of 1,000 of his father's writings to the Library. Hewson was instrumental in establishing cooperation with the British Library with the founding of the Newsplan project, a co-operative preservation project for newspapers in Ireland and the United Kingdom. Hewson retired from the National Library in 1989, handing off the directorship to Dr Patricia Donlon.

As well as working for the NLI, Hewson was a keen user of the NLI's manuscript collection, seeing it as an important resource for Irish history. As such he researched and wrote various articles on local and national history. Between 1965 and 1981 he published four articles in the North Munster Antiquarian Journal on various aspects of the history of Munster and County Clare, his home county. Between 1962 and 1964 Michael Hewson published five popular history articles in The Irish Independent on a wide array of Irish social history topics: the history of the animal designs on early coinage of the Republic of Ireland, the history of Edward Jenner, inventor of the smallpox vaccine, the surprising history of sedan chairs in 1800s Dublin, the story of Henry Ford’s connection with County Cork, and of Vere Foster, inventor of a style of handwriting copybook for young school children.

== Publications ==
- Michael Hewson, (Monday 29 January 1962) "Edward Jenner's Great Discovery." Irish Independent. p. 6.
- Michael Hewson, (Monday 5 March 1962) "Did our coinage depend on a wrong address?" Irish Independent. p. 7.
- Michael Hewson, (Thursday 7 March 1963) "In the days of the sedan chair." Irish Independent. p. 10.
- Michael Hewson, (Tuesday 30 July 1963) "The Father of Tin Lizzie." Irish Independent. p. 8.
- Michael Hewson, (Thursday 13 February 1964) "Vere Foster: generous friend of Ireland.” Irish Independent. p. 10.
- Michael Hewson, (1965) "A word-list from south-west Clare", North Munster Antiquarian Journal 9/4 182–86.
- Michael Hewson, (1965) "A source for 19th century Clare history", North Munster Antiquarian Journal 9/4 194–95.
- Michael Hewson, (1965) "The diaries of John Singleton, of Quinville, Co. Clare", North Munster Antiquarian Journal 17 103–09.
- Rosalind M. Elmes and Michael Hewson, (1975) Catalogue of Irish topographical prints and original drawings.
- Hewson, Michael, (1977) Robert Stearne's diary of the Williamite campaign. An Cosantóir, 33 49–53.
- Michael Hewson, (1981) "Emigration to the 'North American Colonies' from the port of Limerick in 1841", North Munster Antiquarian Journal 23 67–76.
- Ainsworth, J. F., & Hewson, M. (1985). Manuscript Collections in Private Keeping: Reports in National Library of Ireland. Analecta Hibernica, 32, 27–33.
