= Royal Air Force Museum London =

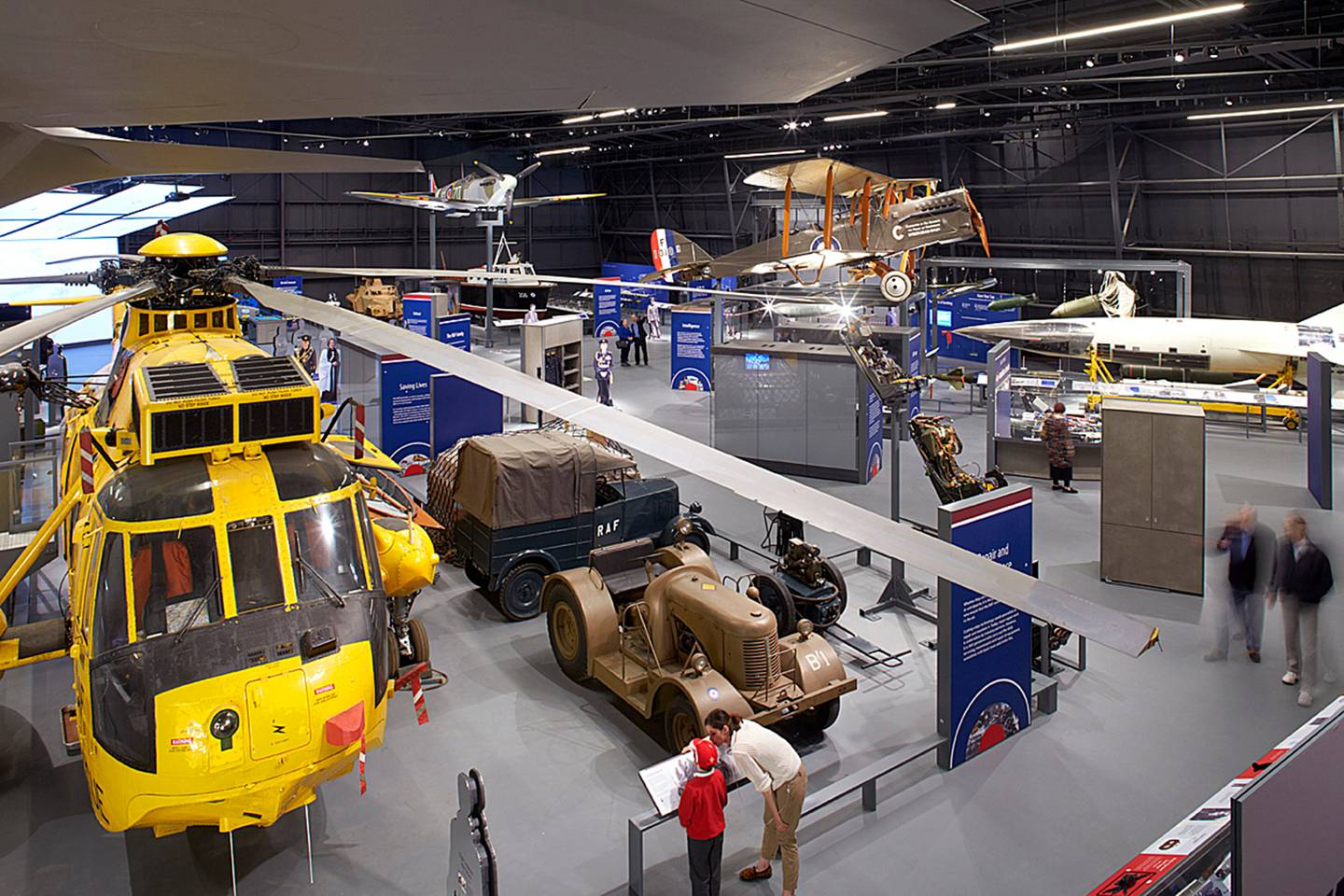

- Location within Greater London
- Former name: Royal Air Force Museum, Hendon
- Established: 15 November 1972; 53 years ago
- Location: Grahame Park Way, Colindale; London, NW9 5LL; United Kingdom
- Coordinates: 51°35′56″N 0°14′19″W
- Type: Aviation museum
- Visitors: 431,037 (2025)
- Public transit access: Colindale; RAF Museum 303, 632, 642
- Website: www.rafmuseum.org.uk

The Royal Air Force Museum London (also commonly known as the RAF Museum) is located on the former Hendon Aerodrome, in North London's Borough of Barnet. It includes five buildings and hangars showing the history of aviation and the Royal Air Force. It is part of the Royal Air Force Museum.

There is another site at Royal Air Force Museum Midlands at RAF Cosford in Shropshire.

== History ==
The museum site at Colindale was once part of the RAF Hendon station and prior to that, one of the first civilian airfields, acquired by Claude Grahame-White in 1911.

In 1914, the aerodrome was requisitioned for Home Defence during the First World War. Hendon became a Royal Naval Air Station, training new pilots in the flying schools on site. Operations ceased after the end of the Great War.

From 1927 to 1939 Hendon housed No. 601 Squadron, nicknamed the 'Millionaires' Squadron' due to the wealth and upper social class of its volunteers. In 1939, the outbreak of war saw Hendon once again become an operational RAF station, home to No. 24 Transport and Communications Squadron. RAF Hendon also served briefly as a fighter station during the Battle of Britain.

The last flight to Hendon by a fixed-wing aircraft took place on 19 June 1968, when the last operational Blackburn Beverley was delivered to the museum prior to its royal opening in 1972. Soon afterwards, the runways were removed to make way for the Grahame Park Housing Estate. The official closure of RAF Hendon took place on 1 April 1987.

The museum was officially opened at the Colindale (then part of Hendon) London site on 15 November 1972 by Queen Elizabeth II. The hangars housed 36 aircraft at opening. Over the years, the collection has increased in size substantially, and aircraft not on display at Hendon were stored or displayed at smaller local RAF station museums.

The first director of the museum was Dr John Tanner, who retired in 1987. In 1988, Dr Michael A. Fopp (who had previously directed the London Transport Museum) was appointed director general of all three sites (London, Cosford and Stafford) operated by the museum. Retired Air Vice-Marshal Peter Dye replaced Fopp as director general on 9 June 2010. In October 2014, it was announced that Maggie Appleton was to be appointed as CEO of the museum.

The Battle of Britain Museum (later Hall) was opened by Queen Elizabeth The Queen Mother in November 1978. On 3 October 2016 the Battle of Britain Hall was permanently closed and refurbished.

The London site has been regularly expanded. For example, in recent years landscaping has taken place to illustrate what the former Hendon airfield was like, in what has become a heavily urbanised area.

As of 2012, it had over 100 aircraft, including the Avro Lancaster S-Sugar, which flew 137 night sorties. It also includes the only complete Hawker Typhoon. Added in 2018, as part of the RAF Centenary exhibitions, were a Westland Sea King helicopter (once flown by Prince William, Duke of Cambridge), a Gnat jet trainer of the Red Arrows, and a full-scale mock-up of the F-35 Lightning II stealth fighter.

== Description ==
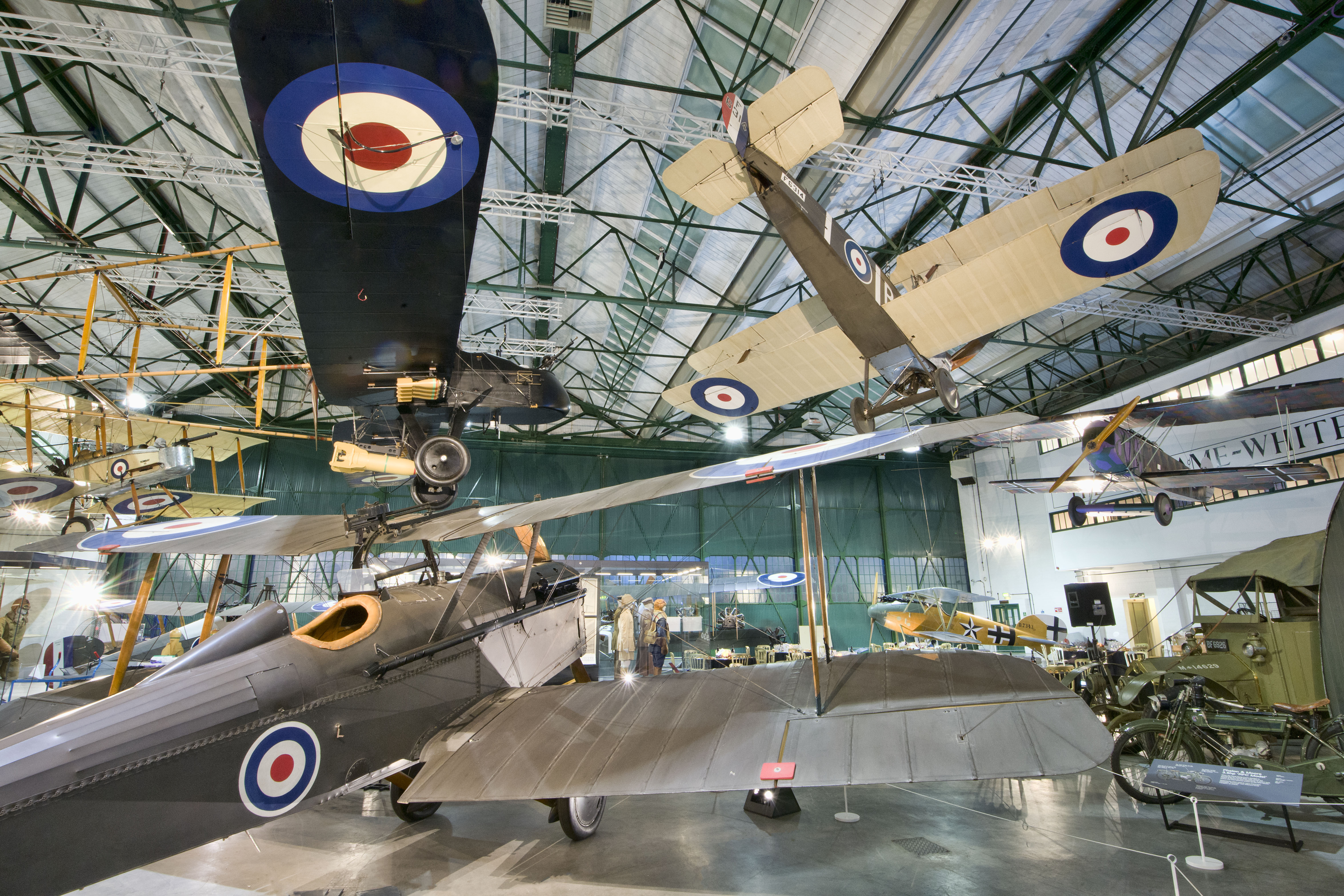
Hangar 2, Grahame-White Factory interior, Royal Aircraft Factory SE.5a in the foreground, FE.2b, Sopwith Camel and Fokker D.VII suspended from the ceiling

The Royal Air Force Museum is a National Museum, a Government non-departmental public body (NDPB) and also is a registered charity.

The Royal Air Force Museum London is displayed over six hangars.

=== Hangar 1, RAF Stories and First to the Future ===
Two exhibitions, RAF Stories and RAF First to the Future, opened in 2018 to commemorate the RAF centenary:

RAF Stories, The First 100 years 1918–2018 of the RAF. This exhibition observes the RAF's first 100 years, from its creation in 1918 as the world's first independent air force. It explores the different roles of the people of the RAF, alongside the changes in technology.

Hangar 1 forms the main point of entry to the museum.

=== Hangar 2, the Grahame-White Factory ===
The factory shows the earliest days of flight on the site of The London Aerodrome, through to the formation of the independent Royal Air Force in 1918.

=== Hangars 3 and 4, The Historic Hangars ===
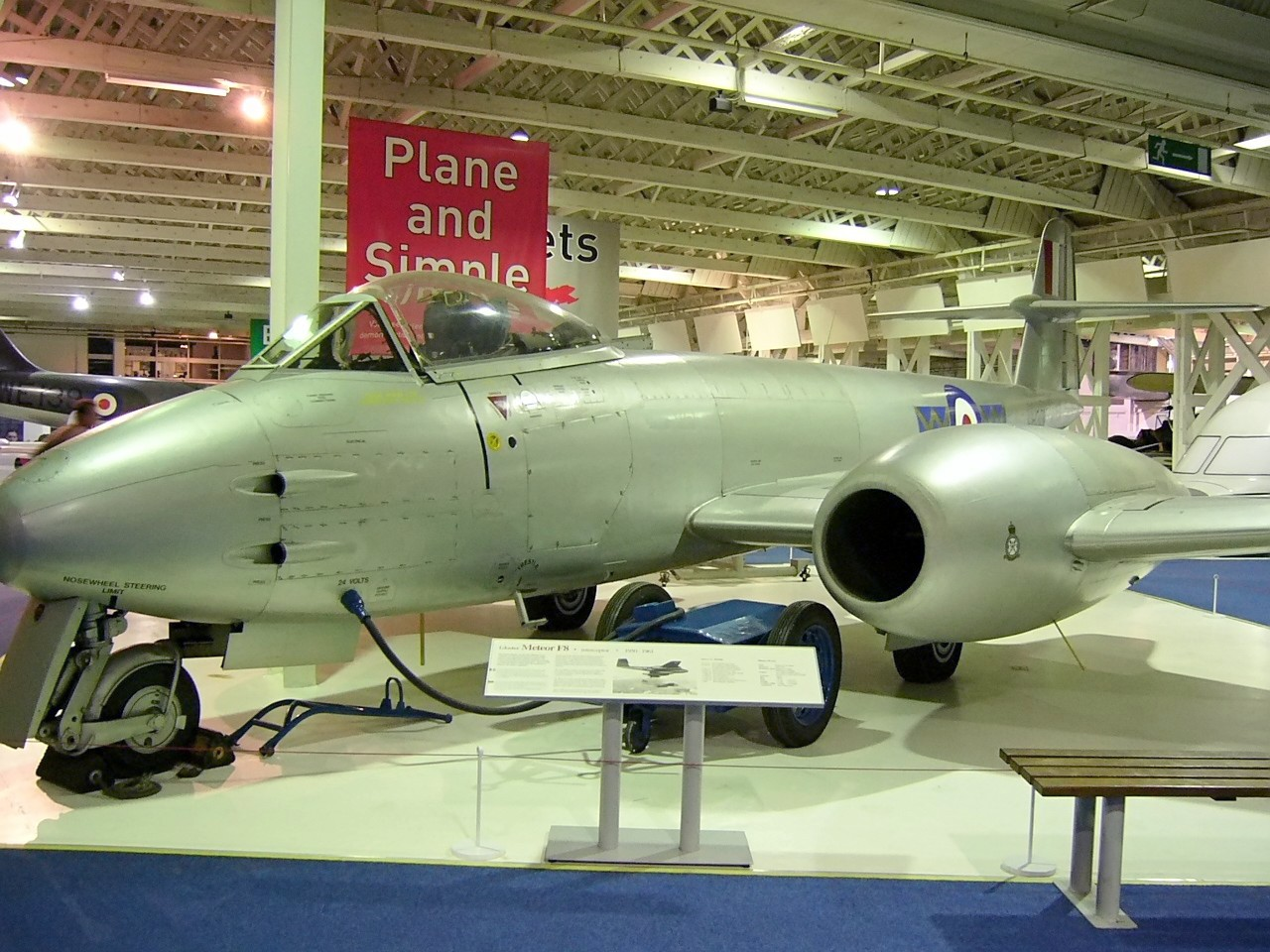
The Gloster Meteor on display in the Historic Hangars

These hangars focus on the aircraft of the Second World War and the Cold War. It includes original Battle of Britain fighter aircraft: the Hawker Hurricane, Messerschmitt Bf 109 and Supermarine Spitfire; helicopters, and some Cold War jet aircraft.

=== Hangar 5, the Bomber Hall ===
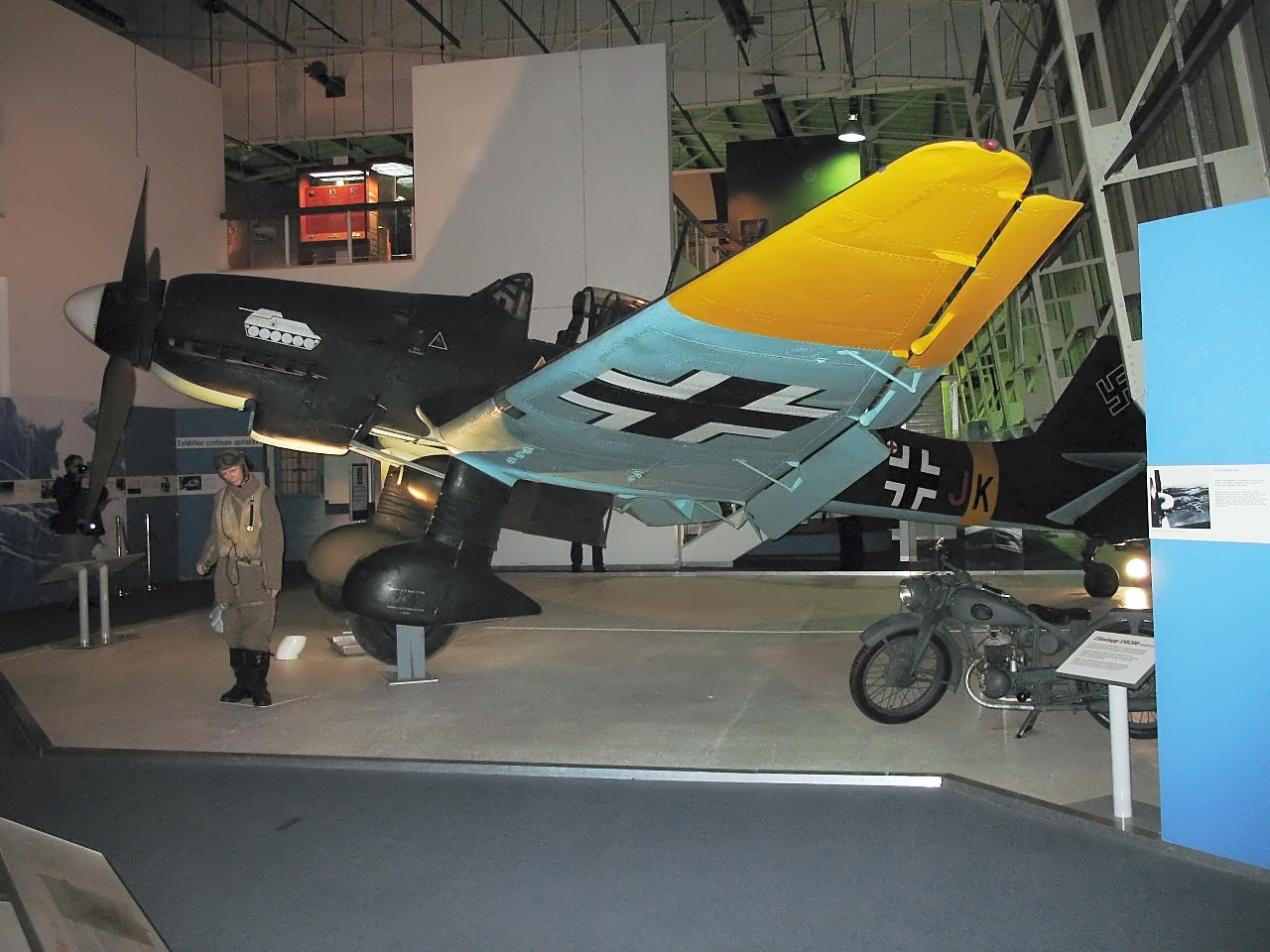
Junkers Ju 87 Stuka on display in the Bomber Hall as part of the Battle of Britain exhibition

Battle of Britain: shows the German Junkers Ju 87 Stuka and Heinkel He 111 bombers which were types used during the Battle of Britain.

=== Hangar 6, RAF in an Age of Uncertainty ===
The RAF from 1980 to the 21st century.

=== Other facilities ===
The museum contains a public restaurant built within a 1930s mess store building. Next to it is a children's play area with mini RAF aircraft, vehicles and buildings. A volunteer centre has been created within Building 69, originally a parachute packing RAF building.

The museum's archives, containing thousands of paper documents, books and photographs are situated on the top floor of Hangars 3/4/5.

== See also ==
- List of aerospace museums
