= Irish Museums Association =

The Irish Museums Association (IMA) is an all-Ireland professional membership body dedicated to the promotion and development of museums.

== Purpose and activities ==
The IMA aims to support the Irish museum sector through activities that highlight the value of collections and the contribution of museums to society as places of learning, conservation, research, and interpretation. Their programme, funded by the Heritage Council and the Department of Culture, Communications and Sport, includes professional development, advocacy, research and dissemination strands: annual conferences, publications such as the sectoral journal Museum Ireland (ISSN 0961-9690), relevant training, and original research.

== History ==
The Irish Museums Association grew out of the Ireland branch of the International Council of Museums in 1977, established by a voluntary executive committee led by James White, director of the National Gallery of Ireland (1964–80), to protect the interests of Irish museums. In 2004, it registered as a operating as a non-profit company limited by guarantee and hired its first member of staff.

=== Leadership ===
Audrey Whitty, Director of the National Library of Ireland and previously Deputy Director and Head of Collections and Learning at the National Museum of Ireland, is the current chair of the governing board of directors, succeeding William Blair, Director of Collections at National Museums NI in 2020. Former chairs also include Brian Crowley, museum curator at Kilmainham Gaol (2013-2017), Paul Doyle, registrar at the National Museum of Ireland (2011-2013) and Dr Marie Bourke, keeper and head of education at the National Gallery of Ireland (2006-2011).

== Conferences ==
The main annual conference takes place each year in a different venue with an overarching theme for the proceedings:

- 2021 Decolonising the Catalogues. Online, 19 to 30 November. Contributors included: Dr Dan Hicks (archaeologist), Ananda Rutherford, research associate, provisional semantics, Tate, Oein DeBhairduin, and Miranda Lowe.
- 2020 Transforming Museums. Athlone, 21 to 22 February. Contributors included: Dr Patrick J. Greene (director of EPIC The Irish Emigration Museum), David Anderson (director general, Amgueddfa Cymru), and Simon O'Connor (director of Museum of Literature Ireland).
- 2019 We are all Engagers. Cork, 01 to 02 March. Contributors included: Dr Graham Black (professor, School of Arts & Humanities at Nottingham Trent University), Lynn Scarff (director of the National Museum of Ireland), and Dr Gillian O'Brien, (reader in Modern Irish history at Liverpool John Moores University).
- 2018 Collecting the ‘now’. Dublin, 10 to 11 May. Contributors included: Finbarr Whooley (director of content at Museum of London), Kasandra O'Connell (head of the Irish Film Archive at the Irish Film Institute), Corinna Gardner (senior curator of design and digital at the Victoria and Albert Museum).
- 2017 Cultural Tourism and the Contemporary Museum. Galway, 3 to 4 March. Contributors included: John Concannon (director of Creative Ireland), Michael Day (chief executive of Historic Royal Palaces), Lee Jolliffe (professor of hospitality and tourism at University of New Brunswick, Canada).
- 2016 Museums for Society: Towards a Cultural Democracy. Dublin, 26 to 28 February. Contributors included: Nazia Ali (curator of Collecting Birmingham, Birmingham Museums Trust), Ciarán Benson (professor emeritus of psychology, University College Dublin), Dr. Marie Bourke (museum professional and former keeper and head of education, National Gallery of Ireland).
- 2015 Museums in Society: Navigating Public Policy. Belfast, 27 February to 1 March. Contributors included: David Anderson (director general, Amgueddfa Cymru), Rebecca Blake (regeneration and community partnerships coordinator, Tate Britain), Siebe Weide (director general, Museumvereniging).
- 2014 Museums & Memory: Challenging Histories. Waterford, 21 to 23 February. Contributors included: Dr Guido Gryseels (director, Royal Museum of Central Africa), Catriona Crowe (senior archivist and head of special projects, National Archives of Ireland), Dr Roisin Higgins (senior lecturer in history, Teesside University).
- 2013 The Porous Museum: Building Partnerships - Making Connections. Kilkenny, 22 to 23 February. Contributors included: Dr Brian Kennedy (director, Toledo Museum of Art), Dr Vicki Porter (head of discovery and engagement, The Wellcome Trust), Mark Taylor (director, Museums Association UK).
- 2012 Rising to the Challenge. Limerick, 24 to 26 February. Contributors included: Julien Anfruns (director general, International Council of Museums), Michael Starrett (chief executive officer, Heritage Council), Chris Bailey (director, Northern Ireland Museums Council).

== See also ==
- Museums Association, United Kingdom
- International Council of Museums
- Heritage Council (Ireland)
