= Museums Association =

British professional association

- Logo for the Association, used since 2020
- Abbreviation: MA
- Formation: 1889
- Legal status: Non-profit company
- Purpose: Museum, Gallery and Heritage
- Region served: United Kingdom
- Website: www.museumsassociation.org/home

The Museums Association (MA) is a professional membership organisation based in London for museum, gallery and heritage professionals and organisations of the United Kingdom. It also offers international membership.

== History ==
The association was started in 1889 by a small group of museums to protect the interests of museums and galleries. Its inaugural meeting was held at the invitation of the Council of the Yorkshire Philosophical Society in York on 20 June 1889. The MA is the oldest museum association in the world.

== Function ==
The MA advocates for museums, sets ethical standards and runs training and professional development for members wishing to further their careers.

== Activities ==
The association organises an annual conference. This is Europe's largest event for museum and heritage professionals.

Members receive the monthly Museums Journal. The MA also produces Museum Practice online. The latest case studies and best practice by museum professionals around the UK, with an interactive platform for users to share their ideas.

Through its work with the Esmee Fairbairn Foundation, the MA has created the Esmee Fairbairn Collections Fund, building on its 2005 report, Collections for the Future.

The MA charts the health of UK museums through its annual survey, Museums in the UK.

In 2018, the MA launched Collections 2030, a research project looking at the long-term purpose, use and management of museum collections.

== Membership ==
The MA has over 8,000 individual members, 580 institutional members, and 250 corporate members.

It runs a professional development scheme, with mentoring and regular training events. "AMA" denotes an Associate of the Museums Association. "FMA" denotes a Fellow of the Museums Association.

== Governance ==
The association is independently funded by its membership, and it is governed by a board of trustees, from all parts of the UK museum community, elected by members. In April 2018, Maggie Appleton replaced David Fleming as president; she is also the CEO of the RAF Museum. Previous presidents include David Anderson, Stuart Davies, David Fleming, William Henry Flower, Jane Glaister, Max Hebditch, Charles Saumarez Smith, Virginia Tandy, and Barbara Woroncow. Kinvara Jardine Paterson joined the MA board as climate champion trustee in Feb 2025.

== See also ==
- MDA (formerly the Museum Documentation Association)
- British Association of Friends of Museums
- Irish Museums Association
