= Audrey Whitty =

Irish curator and national librarian

Director, National Library of Ireland
- Incumbent
- Assumed office February 2023
- Preceded by: Sandra Collins, with an acting director between

Personal details
- Education: University College Dublin (B.A., M.A.); Trinity College Dublin (Ph.D.)
- Occupation: Librarian, curator

Audrey Whitty (born May 1977) is an Irish archaeologist, librarian and curator. As of February 2023, she is the director of the National Library of Ireland. She was deputy director of the National Museum of Ireland (NMI), a curator at the Corning Museum of Glass and a curator of glass and ceramics at the NMI.

== Early life and education ==
Whitty is one of the three children of Eileen (née Stack) and Richard Whitty. She studied at University College Dublin, where she obtained a Bachelor of Arts in History and Archaeology, and a Masters in Archaeology.

== Career ==
=== Museums ===
Whitty worked for the National Museum of Ireland (NMI) from 2001. She was curator of the ceramics, glass and Asian collections, in the Art and Industrial Division of the museum. While working with the museum, she was awarded a doctorate in the History of Art by Trinity College Dublin, and her thesis about the donations of Albert Bender to the National Museum was published as a book in 2011. Bender had given a significant collection to the museum in memory of his mother but for many years there was no space to display it, and Whitty was involved in the re-establishment of a public exhibition of much of the Bender collection.

In 2013, taking a career break, she went to work for the Corning Museum of Glass in New York state, as curator of European and Asian Glass. She returned to Ireland, and the NMI, in 2015, as Keeper (Head) of the Art and Industrial Division, dealing with decorative arts, design and history.

In 2019, she was promoted to head all collections and educational operations of the National Museum, and in 2021, she was appointed as its deputy director. Whitty was involved in the decision to remove Michael Collins' bloodied cap from display as it involved the exhibition of human remains. She curated the exhibition (A)Dressing Our Hidden Truths about the scandalous mother and baby homes and Magdalene laundries where thousands of children died.

=== National library ===
Whitty was designated as the new director of the National Library of Ireland. She took up that office in February 2023, for a five-year term.

=== Other roles ===
Whitty was elected to the board of the Irish Museums Association in 2018, and has been chairperson since 2020. Whitty is a trustee of the Stourbridge Glass Museum, and was from 2020 until February 2023 a member of the board of North Lands Creative, a "centre for the study and development of glass as an artform" in Caithness, Scotland.

== Publications ==
Whitty has more than 70 publications, including a book, a book chapter and a peer-reviewed journal article:

- "The Albert Bender Collection of Asian Art in the National Museum of Ireland".
- "The Industrial Design of Waterford Glass, 1947–c.1965", full chapter in J. M. Hearne (ed.) Glassmaking in Ireland: From the Medieval to the Contemporary. Dublin: Irish Academic Press, 2011, pp. 215–228
- "Frederick Carder’s Years at Stevens & Williams", Journal of Glass Studies, vol. 56, 2014, pp. 370–74

while other publications and contributions include:

- Article: "Francòis-Eugène Rousseau: Pioneer of French Art Nouveau Glass", The Glass Society of Ireland Newsletter 29, 2002, pp. 3–4
- Article: "The Caspar Purdon Clarke Indian and Persian Collection of the National Museum of Ireland, 1878/’79", Museum Ireland 4, 2004, pp. 68–75
- Article: "The Golden Age of Irish Glass", Irish Arts Review, Summer 2012, pp. 124–127
- Brochure piece: "CultureCraft – Culture in the Making" (an exhibition of contemporary craft to mark Derry/Londonderry as UK Capital of Culture 2013) ISBN 978-1-906691-36-3 – pp. 26–29
- Review of: "From Pupil to Master": a contemporary glass exhibition at the Solomon Fine Art Gallery, Dublin (12–27 October 2012); in Glass Network: The CGS Quarterly Magazine, Issue 47 (March 2013), p. 13

== Personal life ==
Whitty is married, with at least one daughter.
