= Fiona Ross =

Fiona Ross may refer to:

- Fiona Ross (journalist), Scottish journalist and broadcaster
- Fiona Ross (nurse) (born 1951), British nurse and academic
- Fiona Ross (public servant), Irish public servant
- Fiona Ross (type designer) (born 1954), British type designer
