= Alf MacLochlainn =

Irish librarian

- Born: 30 July 1926; Dublin, Ireland
- Died: 8 December 2018 (aged 92)
- Occupation: Librarian

Alf MacLochlainn (30 July 1926 - 8 December 2018) was an Irish librarian and director of the National Library of Ireland.

Alf MacLochlainn was born on 30 July 1926 in Dublin. He graduated from University College Dublin with a Bachelor of Arts degree in French and Irish in 1947. He was appointed a librarian in National Library of Ireland (NLI) in 1949, going on to be appointed the director of the NLI in 1976. He took up the post of university librarian in NUI Galway in 1983 until he retired in 1991. He died on 8 December 2018.

== Early life and family ==
Alfred (Alf) MacLochlainn was born in 1926 in Dublin to Alfred Vincent MacLochlainn, who was a photographer, and Marcella Dowling. Alf MacLochlainn's sister is Charlotte MacLochlainn, author of Letters from Doig: Letters to My Dear Ones in Ireland, 1955 to 1958. She married John Groarke, a teacher and moved to London where she had four sons. The family then emigrated to St Bruno, Quebec in Canada. Their grandmother was Emily Pearse, half sister to Patrick and William Pearse who died in the 1916 Easter Rising. Emily Pearse was one of two surviving children from James Pearse's first marriage to Susannah Fox. James Pearse is great-grandfather to Alf and Charlotte MacLochlainn. In 1863, in Birmingham, James Pearse married Susannah Fox.

Alf MacLochlainn grew up in Dublin city and he completed a bachelor's degree in French and Irish in University College Dublin in 1947. The following year 1948, he graduated with a master's degree in Irish once again from University College Dublin. He completed internships at the Library of Congress and the Simmons College in Boston after he finished his MA.

He married Fionnuala Ní Riain, Irish singer who most notably sang ‘Taim Breoite Go Leor’ in 1976. She performed alongside Luke Kelly and other Irish singers. She recorded songs with Gael Linn alongside women like Máire Ní Scolaí and Marjorie Courtney in a collection called Amhrain na Grá.

The couple performed together, with Alf MacLochlainn performing his satires and Fionnuala MacLochlainn singing Irish songs. The couple had six children together. One son, Colm MacLochlainn, followed his mother into performing and singing. Alf MacLochlainn moved his family from Dublin to Salthill, Galway where he joined the National University of Ireland Galway as a librarian in 1982.

== Career ==
Following his Masters, in 1949 Alf MacLochlainn was hired by the National Library of Ireland in the position of assistant librarian. He held various positions during his tenure at the National Library, including as assistant keeper of manuscripts in 1963, and then deputy director. Twenty years into his career with the National Library, in 1976 MacLochlainn was appointed its director serving as successor to former directors Richard J. Hayes and Patrick Henchy. MacLochlainn held the position of director for five years until he resigned in 1982. The National Library recorded in a report that he was with the National Library for over 30 years, but that Maclochlainn was choosing to leave for higher paying libraries in Ireland.

During his time as director, the collections acquired by the National Library include the Dillon-Mahon Family archives, received by the library in 1976.

In April 1982, Alf MacLochlainn became the librarian of the University College Galway, known today as the University of Galway. He retired from the position in 1987. After his retirement, Alf MacLochlainn accepted a position as the Burns Library Visiting Scholar in Irish Studies at Boston College for the 1991-1992 academic year. During his time, he was named the inaugural holder of the Burns Library Chair. As a writer, his works include writings for radio, films, television and fictional novels.

Alf MacLochlainn was also engaged with various committees, serving as trustee of the Chester Beatty Library, chair of the James Joyce Institute of Ireland, and a member of the board of directors of the Irish Film Theatre. He was also a member of the Irish Manuscripts Commission, the Library Council on the committee of the Royal Irish Academy for the study of Anglo-Irish Literature, and member of the north–south committee on library cooperation in Ireland.

== Later life and death ==
As part of the Galway Labour History Group, MacLochlainn gave lectures on Walter Macken in 1990 and a tribute to Eileen Costello in 1999. MacLochlainn also edited a publication of the Galway Labour History Party titled The Emigrant Experience, published in 1991. MacLochlainn worked with the former mayor of Galway Michael D. Higgins on this publication, who was also part of the Labour Party. Another writing project MacLochlainn worked on while a part of the Galway Labour History group, was a pamphlet titled Two Galway Schools published in 1993. This pamphlet had two articles titled The Claddagh Piscatory School written by MacLochlainn, and The Salthill Industrial School written by Tony Regan. Maclochlainn's article detailed the history of the Claddagh Piscatory School and its role in early education and teaching English.

MacLochlainn's son, Fred died of a heart attack on 21 February 1993 in Florianopolis, Brazil.

In 1994, Alf MacLochlainn was voted onto the Cultural Relations Committee, which is under the Department of Foreign Affairs for Ireland.

MacLochlainn continued to write outside of his library career. He published his second book, The Corpus in the Library: Stories and Novellas, in 1996. This book consisted of two novellas and seven short stories. He continued published his third and final book, Past Habitual, in April 2015.

MacLochlainn died at age 92 on 8 December 2018 in Galway, Ireland, with a service held at Shannon Crematorium on 12 December 2018. At his funeral service, the president of Ireland, Michael D. Higgins, delivered a commemorative speech.

In 2022, MacLochlainn's son Colm died and also had a service held at Shannon Crematorium on 8 June 2022.

== Collections and works ==
During his time as director of the National Library of Ireland, there were several additions to the collection. One such accession was a letter addressed to MacLochlainn from Proinsias Ó'Conluain, Irish broadcaster and journalist, which included a donation of a postcard from Irish writer Brendan Behan.

Before serving as director of the Library, Alf MacLochlainn was assistant keeper of manuscripts and was described as having "a genuine love for the Library's collections". MacLochlainn also published a pamphlet entitled Writers, Raconteurs and Notable Feminists: Two Monographs, based on a lecture given by Andrée Sheehy-Skeffington at the library. This pamphlet was later presented to President Mary Robinson at Áras an Uachtaráin in July 1994.

MacLochlainn contributed articles to several journals on topics surrounding Irish culture. He also contributed works in Irish. MacLochlainn was a lyricist and several of his songs, poems, and ballads are included in the National Library of Ireland's collections.

He was involved with the Irish Labour Party, receiving a long-service award in 2007, and writing articles for Saothar, a journal created by the Irish Labour History Society. He was also a member of the Galway Labour History Group.

MacLochlainn's works of fiction include Out of Focus (1985), The Corpus in the Library: Stories and Novellas (1996), Past Habitual: Stories (2015).
