= T(D) v L(F) & Anor =

Irish Supreme Court case

T.(D.) v L.(F.) [2003] IESC 59
- Coat of arms of Ireland
- Court: Supreme Court of Ireland
- Decided: 26 November 2003
- Citations: T(D) v L(F), [2003] IESC 59

Case history
- Appealed from: High Court
- Appealed to: Supreme Court

Court membership
- Judge sitting: Keane C.J. Denham J. Murray J. Hardiman J. Geoghegan J.

Case opinions
- The burden of proof in acquiring a domicile of choice had not been discharged.
- Decision by: Judge Keane.
- Concur/dissent: no dissents.

Keywords
- Conflict of laws – Jurisdiction – Matrimonial proceedings – Domicile – Abandonment of domicile of origin and acquisition of domicile of choice.

T(D) v L(F) & Anor, [2003] IESC 59 is a reported Irish Supreme Court case in which the Court held that in relation to foreign divorce proceedings, the burden of proof is on the parties to establish their domicile. Thus, in this case the Supreme Court dismissed the appeal of the husband and upheld the judgement of the High Court as he was unable to establish his domicile.

== Background ==
=== Background law ===
Until the 1937 Irish Constitution came into force, the "dependent domicile" of a wife concept provided that in cases regarding determination of domicile of the parties, the domicile of a wife was regarded, for all such purposes, as being the same as her husband. However, in C(M) v T(M) the High Court held that the rule was inconsistent with the Constitution. This was upheld by the Irish Supreme Court in W v W. Reflecting this, s.5(1) of the Domicile and Recognition of Foreign Divorces Act 1986 provides "For the rule of law that a divorce is recognised if granted in a country where both spouses are domiciled, there is hereby substituted a rule that a divorce shall be recognised if granted in the country where either spouse is domiciled."

In C.M^{c}G. v D.W. & Anor, it was held by the High Court that orders given prior to the enactment of s.5(1) of the Domicile and Recognition of Foreign Divorces Act 1986, were still governed by the previous common law rules, including the "dependent domicile" concept. The judge in that case held that the courts should extend recognition to decrees of foreign courts where either of the spouses had been "ordinary residence [in the foreign jurisdiction] for one year prior" to the institution of proceedings.

=== Facts of the case ===
The couple that were party to these proceedings were both Irish citizens who married in Ireland in 1980. In 1987 the family moved to the Netherlands and lived there until 1992. Difficulties subsequently developed resulting in the respondent wife returning to Ireland in 1992. A year later the respondent instituted divorce proceedings in the Netherlands. An order in her favour was made by the Dutch court in February 1994. This order awarded her "interim maintenance payments". After the respondent failed to pursue divorce proceedings, the appellant himself commenced divorce proceedings in the Netherlands in March 1994. The appellant then returned to live in Ireland in May 1994. The decree of divorce was granted in September 1994 by the Dutch court.

=== History of the lower court ===
In July 2000, the respondent commenced proceedings in the Irish High Court claiming a decree of judicial separation and certain ancillary reliefs. The preliminary issue that arose as part of these proceedings was whether the husband the divorce obtained under the civil law of the Netherlands should be recognised in the Irish state pursuant to the Family Law Act 1995. This arose as in order for the husband to be entitled to such a declaration he had to have been domiciled in the Netherlands at the time the divorce was granted by the Dutch court.

The preliminary issue was heard by Morris P. in the High Court on 23 November 2003. The case before the judge was presented with having two limbs:

1. whether at the time the divorce proceedings were instituted in the Dutch courts, the husband had acquired domicile in the Netherlands and so the divorce granted by the Dutch court was entitled to recognition in the Irish state as prescribed by law; and
2. if the husband had not acquired a domicile in the Netherlands, whether the court should apply the High Court rule outlined above in C.M^{c}G. v D.W. & Anor. This would mean that since it was accepted that the husband had been "ordinarily resident" in the Netherlands for a one year or more period at the time of proceedings, the decree granted by the Dutch court was thus entitled to recognition.

The trial judge in the High Court rejected both limbs of this case and determined that the divorce granted by the Dutch court was not entitled to recognition in Ireland.

The husband appealed, with respect to the first limb as to whether he had been domiciled in the Netherlands thus resulting in the divorce granted by the Dutch court being recognised in Ireland.

== Holding of the Supreme Court ==
The Judges hearing the Supreme Court appeal were Justice Susan Denham, Chief Justice Ronan Keane, Justice John L. Murray, Justice Hugh Geoghegan and Justice Adrian Hardiman. Chief Justice during this period Judge Keane, provided the final judgement with no dissents.

=== Application of Irish case law ===
In his analysis, Keane CJ referenced previous Irish case law with similar facts. Firstly, the judge provided that the factors which must be taken into account to determine whether the Irish domicile had been replaced by a domicile of choice in the Netherlands had been summarised by Budd J. in In Re. Sillar, Hurley v Winbush. These factors which had been approved of on a number of occasions in the Irish Supreme Court provides that the person must be determined to make the foreign jurisdiction his home. This must involve an intention to abandon a former domicile and where a declaration of such intention is made it must be weighed with the rest of the evidence.

In applying these factors to the current case of the husband, Keane CJ provided that it was important to bear in mind that a decision to move one's residence to another country may not be sufficient to establish that the person has abandoned his domicile of origin and acquired another domicile of choice. In doing so, referencing the decision of Henchy J. in T v T, which provided that:

"The period lived abroad may be no more than the external manifestation of the temporary compulsion of circumstances. Such bare facts as we have in this case as to the husband's foreign residence do not show the volitional and factual transition which is the sine qua non for shedding a domicile of origin and acquiring a domicile of choice."

The judge concluded in the application of these "well settled principles of law", "it would not have been possible for the trial judge" to hold that the presumption as to the domicile of origin had been rebutted.

=== Detailed fact inquiry ===
In coming to a judgement in this case Keane CJ conducted an analysis of the more detailed facts of the appellant and respondents' circumstances in moving to the Netherlands and whether the facts of such circumstances acted to rebut the burden of proof and prove that the husband had in fact acquired a new domicile in the Netherlands.

Both the appellant and respondent proposed that they "adjusted well" to living in the Netherlands. However, difficulties developed in the marriage resulting in the respondent returning to Ireland. The appellant noted that he disagreed with her decision to move back to Ireland with the children. However, when this happened in August 1992 it was accepted that his marriage was at an end. He also provided in evidence that prior to her departure, the respondent suggested that the appellant should inquire about the possibility of obtaining a job with the Irish company in Ireland, but this was not in his interests. He visited his family at Christmas time and again at regular intervals. In 1994 he returned to Ireland permanently but maintained that his domicile was still that of the Netherlands.

Upon looking at the more detailed evidence regarding the family's situation the judge outlined that the previous case law states that one must look at all the surrounding circumstances in determining whether the husband at the relevant time had formed intention of residing indefinitely in the Netherlands, the alleged domicile of choice. He provided that in 1992 the husband had no intention of returning permanently to Ireland but that it remained possible that if the husband's circumstances changed, he would have returned to Ireland permanently. This the judge concluded falls "well short of the formation of a settled purpose of residing indefinitely in the Netherlands". The judge stated with emphasis that he could not disregard the significant factor that the husband abandoned any plans to remain indefinitely in the Netherlands as he returned to Ireland within a matter of weeks of the relevant date.

The court dismissed the appeal and reaffirmed the finding of the High Court.

== Subsequent developments ==
The case returned to the High Court, the respondent argued that if the Irish courts were to grant a decree of divorce, this would be inconsistent with a judgment by a court of another EU member state, something that was impermissible under EU law. This was, therefore a question of EU law. Both the High Court and Court of Appeal rejected this argument. However, the Supreme Court granted leave noting:

that there may be circumstances where this Court, as a court of final appeal within the Irish legal order, may be obliged to grant leave to appeal in circumstances where to do otherwise might create a risk that a point which should be the subject of a reference to the Court of Justice under Art. 267 of the TFEU might not be referred. Obviously for such a question to arise this Court, on the leave application, would require to be satisfied that there was a realistic possibility that an issue of European law might arise whose determination might be necessary to resolve the case and that any such issue was, at least arguably, not acte clair.
