= Aongus Ó hAonghusa =

Irish public servant

- Born: 24 September 1959 (age 66)
- Occupation: Public servant

Aongus Ó hAonghusa is an Irish public servant, and former director of the National Library of Ireland (NLI). Ó hAonghusa served as the director of the NLI from 2003 to 2009.

== Early life and family ==
Aongus Ó hAonghusa was born in Galway, Ireland on 24 September 1959, where he was one of multiple children.

He attended the University College Galway in the 1970s, attaining a BA in zoology. He has a master's degree in Public Administration from University College Dublin. He and his wife have two children together.

== National Library of Ireland ==
In 2000, Ó hAonghusa began his career at the NLI in an administration role. In September 2003, Ó hAonghusa was appointed as the interim director, succeeding Brendan O’Donoghue upon his retirement. In 2004, Ó hAonghusa was involved in the curation of James Joyce's handwritten manuscripts of Ulysses.

In 2005, Ó hAonghusa officially became the director of the NLI. In 2006 he oversaw the facilitation of the donation of the Project Arts Centre's archive, celebrating its 40th anniversary, he described the collection of newspaper clippings, scripts, and letters as "a magical mystery tour." He also oversaw the loan of personal materials of W. B. Yeats for the first major Yeats exhibit and the acquisition of the Tom and Kathleen Clarke letters, relevant to the 1916 Rising. In September 2006, Ó hAonghusa welcomed Queen Sonja of Norway, the second royal visitor to the NLI, for the opening of the Portraits of Ibsen exhibit by Norwegian artist Håkon Gullvåg.

In November 2006, the Arts Committee sought funding for a new building, highlighting the need for improved storage and preservation. By December 2006, the NLI proposed plans for a new building to accommodate its expanding collection. Additionally, in the same month, the Samuel Beckett collection was acquired.

During his time as director, Ó hAonghusa opened the "If I Were A Blackbird" exhibit at the NLI which honoured works from singer Delia Murphy and diplomat Thomas J Kiernan. Together the couple spent 60 years as Irish representatives in Australia. Ó hAonghusa also worked on a proposal and plan to build an extension for the library. In July 2007, the government approved the plan for the new building that would include above and below ground storage.

Ó hAonghusa accepted two major donations in 2008, in April the author Roddy Doyle donated his literary papers for the Library to preserve and exhibit. He described it "as invaluable source for researchers". In June, the Irish Queer Archives transferred their archive to the NLI. The archive includes thousands of printed materials that covers the history of the queer community in Ireland. Many of the materials are personal in nature, such as letters and diaries. Ó hAonghusa described the event as "one of the most significant movements for social change in modern Ireland".

== Later career ==
Ó hAonghusa stepped down as director of the NLI in January 2010 to return to civil service. In July 2017, he attended a UNCAT convention as part of the Irish delegation which provided an update on the welfare of the citizens of Ireland. He was later the assistant principal officer of the residential institutions redress unit. This board is an independent agency within the Government of Ireland set up following the Residential Institutions Redress Act, 2002. On 16 November 2017 he attended a Committee of Public Accounts debate where he explained the transfer of funds and property to the RIRB when questioned. On 15 November 2018 he attended the Joint Committee on Education and Skills debate in support of RIRB colleagues. In August 2019, he was quoted in the Irish Examiner in support of the Retention of Records Bill 2019 as necessary for his committee's project at the RIRB.
