= Séamus Henchy =

Irish judge, barrister and academic

Judge of the Supreme Court
- In office 2 October 1972 – 11 October 1988
- Nominated by: Government of Ireland
- Appointed by: Éamon de Valera

Judge of the High Court
- In office 15 January 1962 – 2 October 1972
- Nominated by: Government of Ireland
- Appointed by: Éamon de Valera

Personal details
- Born: 6 December 1917 Corofin, County Clare, Ireland
- Died: 5 April 2009 (aged 91) Monkstown, Dublin, Ireland
- Spouse: Averil Graney (m. 1934)
- Relatives: Patrick Henchy (brother)
- Education: University College Galway; University College Dublin; King's Inns

Séamus Anthony Henchy (6 December 1917 – 5 April 2009) was an Irish judge, barrister, and academic who served as a Judge of the Supreme Court of Ireland between 1972 and 1988 and a Judge of the High Court from 1962 to 1972. Many of Henchy's judgments are considered to be influential in the development of Irish constitutional law.

Born in County Clare, he studied law and Celtic studies in Galway and Dublin, obtaining a PhD in Celtic studies in 1943. He practiced as a barrister and was appointed to the High Court in 1962. He presided over the Arms Trial in 1970. He was elevated to the Supreme Court in 1972, where he was noted for his opinions in McGee v. The Attorney General, Cahill v. Sutton, Norris v. Attorney General and Crotty v. An Taoiseach. He died in 2009.

== Early life ==
Henchy was born in 1917 to shopkeepers Patrick and Margaret in Corofin, County Clare, as one of seven children. He attended primary school in Corofin and for secondary school went to St Mary's College, Galway.

His university education began at University College Galway, where he obtained a BA in Celtic Studies. He then concurrently studied for a MA in Galway, and later a LL.B. at University College Dublin and to become a barrister at the King's Inns. He completed a PhD at UCD in 1943, supervised by D. A. Binchy, on the law of fosterage. Using his Irish name, Séamus Ó hInnse and as part of the Dublin Institute for Advanced Studies, he published Miscellaneous Irish annals in 1947.

== Legal career ==
He was called to the bar in 1943 and primarily practiced in the West of Ireland. He became a senior counsel in 1959. His practice involved civil cases and prosecutions on behalf of the state.

Alongside his legal practice, he was appointed a part-time professor of law at University College Dublin, specialising in Roman law, jurisprudence, and legal history. He published on "The Communist Theory of Law" in Studies in 1957 and was the first Irish academic published in the Modern Law Review. He also wrote about the role of the Visitor and the National University of Ireland.

== Judicial career ==
=== High Court ===
His judicial career began in 1962 upon his appointment to the High Court. He presided over many personal injuries cases and heard at first instance as part of a panel of three judges the case of State (Nicolaou) v. An Bord Uchtála. He was the judge in the second trial related to the Arms Crisis in 1970, where Charles Haughey and Neil Blaney stood accused of conspiracy to import arms. The trial required him to have 24-hour Garda protection.

In 1965, he was the chairperson of a commission, joined by Felix Ermacora and Peter Papadatos, convened by the International Commission of Jurists to investigate allegations of racism in the public service of Guyana. They concluded that racial discrimination had occurred. He also chaired the Mental Illness Commission.

=== Supreme Court ===
He was elevated to the Supreme Court of Ireland in 1972, following the retirement of Judge Richard McLoughlin. He was frequently president of the Court of Criminal Appeal during the 1970s.

He was best known for his time on the court coinciding with significant constitutional law cases and his opinions in them. He was seen to be a liberal in relation to social issues. His first major decision was in McGee v. The Attorney General which invalidated a law prohibiting the sale of contraceptives in Ireland. In 1983, he issued a dissent in Norris v. Attorney General where the majority upheld a criminal ban on homosexuality. He said that the relevant parts of the legislation were unconstitutional "on the ground that by their overreach and lack of precision and of due discrimination, they trench on an area of personal intimacy and seclusion which requires to be treated as inviolate". He wrote a concurring opinion with the then Chief Justice Tom O'Higgins in 1980 in the case of Cahill v. Sutton which established the rule of standing in Irish constitutional law where Hench wrote:

The primary rule as to standing in constitutional matters is that the person challenging the constitutionality of the statute, or some other person for whom he is deemed by the court to be entitled to speak, must be able to assert that, because of the alleged unconstitutionality, his or that other person’s interests have been adversely affected, or stand in real or imminent danger of being adversely affected by the operation of the statute.

He also contributed to decisions establishing the right to legal aid in criminal trials and in the case of Crotty v. An Taoiseach which established the need for a referendum to incorporate new European Union treaties into Irish law where he wrote:

There is, of course, nothing in the Constitution to prevent the Government, or any person or group or institution, from advocating or campaigning for or otherwise working for a change in the Constitution. Likewise, there does not appear to be any constitutional bar to anon-binding arrangement by the State to consult with other states in the conduct of its foreign policy. It is quite a different matter when, ashere, it is proposed that the State be bound by an international treaty that requires the State to act in the sphere of foreign relations in a manner that would be inconsistent with constitutional requirements. What would be an imperative under international law would be proscribed under the Constitution. In such circumstances, it is the Constitution that must prevail.

Henchy also laid the grounds in favour of the harmonious judicial interpretation of the Irish Constitution as opposed to the literal approach following his judgment in the case Tormey v. Ireland given that the harmonious approach goes further, ensuring that the Constitution is internally consistent and not contradictory. The harmonious approach was summed in Tormey thus:

As indicated earlier in this judgment, Article 34, s 3, sub-s 1, despite its unqualified and unambiguous terms, cannot be given an entirely literal construction. The rule of literal interpretation, which is generally applied in the absence of ambiguity or absurdity in the text, must here give way to the more fundamental rule of constitutional interpretation that the Constitution must be read as a whole and that its several provisions must not be looked at in isolation, but treated as interlocking parts of the general constitutional scheme. This means that where two constructions of a provision are open in light of the Constitution as a whole, despite the apparent unambiguity of the provision itself, the Court should adopt the construction which will achieve the smooth and harmonious operation of the Constitution. A judicial attitude of strict construction should be avoided when it would allow the imperfection or inadequacy of the words used to defeat or pervert any of the fundamental purposes of the Constitution. It follows from such a global approach that, save where the Constitution itself otherwise provides, all its provisions should be given due weight and effect and not be subordinated one to the other. Thus, where there are two provisions in apparent conflict with one another, there should be adopted, if possible, an interpretation which will give the harmonious effect to both provisions. The true purpose and range of a Constitution would not be achieved if it were treated as no more than the sum of its parts.

Judge Henchy was also instrumental in shaping the jurisprudence surrounding the principle of proportionality as a core facet in Irish Constitutional law most notably in the case of Heany v. Ireland. In his judgment on the case, he laid down the criteria to which courts should apply it stating:

In considering whether a restriction on the exercise of rights is permitted by the Irish Constitution, the courts in this country and elsewhere have found it helpful to apply the test of proportionality, a test which contains the notions of minimal restraint on the exercise of protected rights and of the exigencies of the common good in a democratic society. This is a test frequently adopted by the European Court of Human Rights (see, for example Times Newspapers Ltd. v. United Kingdom, (1979) 2 E.H.R.R. 245) and has recently been formulated by the Supreme Court in Canada in the following terms. The objectives of the impugned provision must be of sufficient importance to warrant overriding a constitutionally protected right. It must relate to concerns pressing and substantial in a free and democratic society. The means chosen must pass a proportionality test. They must: (a) be rationally connected to the objective and not be arbitrary, unfair or based on irrational considerations; (b) impair the right as little as possible, and (c) be such that their effects on rights are proportional to the objective.

He retired from the court in October 1988.

=== Further roles ===
Henchy was among those appointed in 1974 to the Anglo-Irish Commission on Law Enforcement, arising out of the Sunningdale Agreement. He chaired a committee which produced a report in 1978, which became the basis for the Criminal Law (Insanity) Act 2006, changing the law on the defence of insanity and introducing the defence of diminished responsibility to Ireland. He was appointed the first chairperson of the Independent Radio and Television Commission for a five-year term beginning in 1988, a body responsible for issuing the first commercial radio licences in Ireland. He retired a year early in order to take up the position.

=== Legacy ===
Henchy was awarded an honorary doctorate by Trinity College Dublin in 1990 and another by NUI Galway in June 1999. At his ceremony at NUIG, he was cited as being "one of the most outstanding judges and jurists of 20th-century Ireland". Upon his death, the Irish Independent commented that he was "one of the country's most respected and influential judges." The Times observed that his judgments were "in a flowing prose style of exceptional elegance." Gerard Hogan believed that he was one of Ireland's "greatest judges".

In July 2020, Chief Justice Frank Clarke writing for the Supreme Court in Friends of the Irish Environment v. The Government of Ireland said that he "fully agreed with the observations" of Henchy in approaching unenumerated rights in McGee and Norris.

== Personal life ==
Henchy was married to Averil Graney. He lived in Monkstown, Dublin and was a member of the Royal Irish Yacht Club.

His brother, Patrick, was a librarian and director of the National Library of Ireland.

He died at the age of 91 in April 2009. His funeral was attended by the then Chief Justice of Ireland John L. Murray, the Attorney General of Ireland Paul Gallagher and aides-de-camp to the President of Ireland and the Taoiseach. He is buried at Shanganagh Cemetery.
