= Patrick Henchy =

Irish librarian

- Born: 5 May 1913; Corofin, County Clare, Ireland
- Died: 6 May 2001 (aged 88); Donnybrook, Dublin
- Occupation: librarian

Patrick Henchy was born in Corofin, County Clare on 5 May 1913. He studied history and Irish in University College Galway. His first job was as a teacher at St. Eunan's College, Letterkenny, County Donegal. He was appointed assistant librarian in the National Library of Ireland in 1941, becoming the keeper of printed books in 1948. He succeeded Richard J. Hayes as director of the NLI in July 1967 until 1976. He then went on to become director of the Chester Beatty Library until 1983. He died at his home in Donnybrook, Dublin on 6 May 2001.

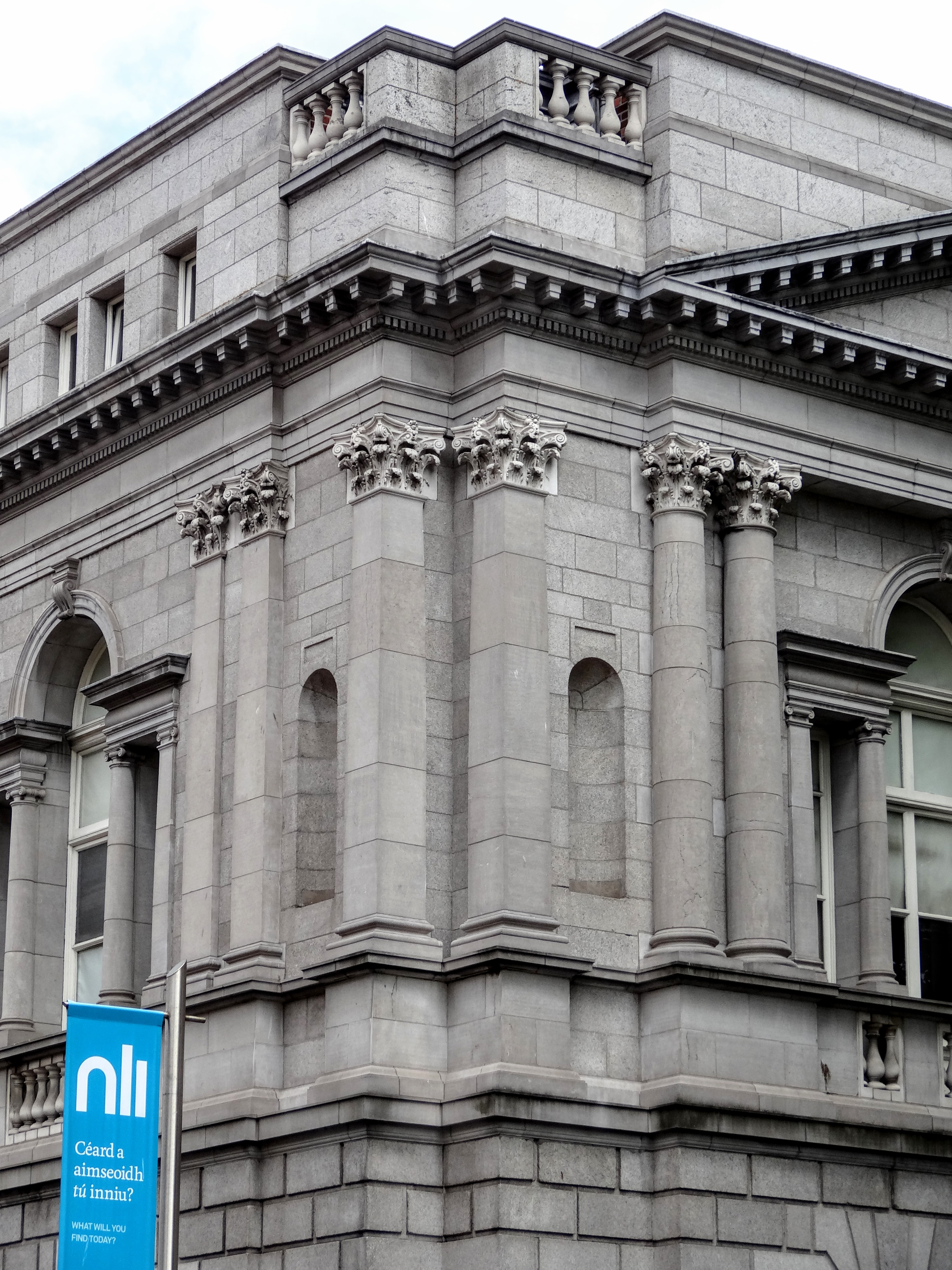
The National Library of Ireland. Henchy was heavily involved in the expansion of the Library into a new building on Kildare Street.

== Early life ==
Patrick Henchy, also known as "Paddy", was born on May 5, 1913 in Corofin, County Clare, Ireland. He was born into a family of seven children, from the parents Patrick Henchy and Margaret née O'Grady. Born into a devout Catholic family, Henchy expressed his deep faith and opposed any form of violence throughout his early life.

For his primary education, Henchy first attended St Flannan's College, Ennis, which is located in County Clare. After moving to Galway, Henchy attended St Mary's College, Galway, and later attended University of Galway where he graduated with a Bachelor of Arts with a double first honors degree in Irish and History in 1935.

Later spending much of his time in Dublin, Henchy's appreciation of the city grew as he explored more of the city and county, enjoying walks and knowledge of Wicklow hills, while also admiring the various turns of the seasons throughout the year. Henchy spent much of his time in Dublin county, living in Eglinton Park, Donnybrook, Dublin, where he met and established several close friendships that would later serve as career enhancing connections. Henchy was publicly close with those of Patrick Kavanagh, a poet and journalist, J. Barry Brown, an antiquarian book collector, and Edward MacLysaght, a Clare genealogist. All of these connections and friendships later became helpful when Henchy began collecting materials during his role at the National Library of Ireland. Several of these connections also led Henchy to participate in exclusive groups, including the Dublin of Georgian Architecture, The Dublin of Irish Language Movement, and the Dublin of Literature.

On October 15, 1952, Henchy married Trinity College librarian and Spanish scholar, Monica Leahy, from the parents Maurice Leahy and Mary D. Leahy. The couple went on to have three daughters, one of whom died in an accident at 25 years old.

== Career and role at the National Library of Ireland ==
Henchy taught at St Eunan's College in Letterkenny, Co. Donegal, starting in 1936, only a year after his graduation from UCG (University College Galway). Five years later, in 1941, Henchy came into the National Library of Ireland as assistant librarian. With the advent of the second world war the government called the library's then-current director R. J. Hayes to the Department of Defence and the absence left many responsibilities to Henchy instead. In 1948, he became assistant director of the library.

Henchy reigned as director of the Library from his appointment in 1967 until his 1976 retirement therein. In his work, he was very interested in material points of Irish heritage, such as the work of James Joyce, having said, "Nothing printed in Ireland should ever be thrown away. I mean, think of the poem 'Et tu, Healy', written by the young schoolboy Joyce... which his proud father instantly rushed out and had printed. Well, no copy of it survived, but if one did, it would be worth thousands and thousands of pounds."

Similarly, Henchy searched the library for a specific letter Joyce had written in 1903 to the Irish Times which then appeared in a published collection of Joyce's work in 1966. Henchy wanted to promote public use of the library, which included opening it on Saturdays. In October 1969 he founded the National Library of Ireland Society (NLIS) to which he gave a retrospective speech about the library in 1985. His description and reasoning for the Society was "it is a gathering of citizens, scholars, industrialists, and people of all kinds who see that the National Library is an important institution, worthy of more attention than it tends to get."

After leaving the NLI in 1976, he started a new position at the Chester Beatty Library, also in Dublin, as its director, where he stayed until retirement in 1983. There he initiated having the library open on Saturdays, as he had done with the NLI, to introduce more visitors because he wanted people to have wider access to its collections of artefacts from multiple continents, mentioning how it was an important addition to Ireland's culture.

== Later life and death ==
In his later life, Patrick Henchy continued living in Eglinton Park, Donnybrook, in Dublin, and contributing to the library world. In 1985 Henchy collected a large sum of money to fund cultural bodies like the Palestrina Choir of St Mary's Pro-Cathedral, the National Library of Ireland, and the Royal Hibernian Academy. This feat was made possible through Henchy's friendship with J. Barry Brown, who along with his wife, Wanda Petronella Brown, gave an endowment to Henchy. Henchy also heavily aided Con Howard in administering lectures and events as one of the founding members of the Cumman Merriman Organization.

On the 6th of May 2001, one day after his 88th birthday, Henchy died in his Donnybrook home. That same day, his body was removed from his home and was taken to the Church of the Sacred Heart, Donnybrook, where his body was kept until the next day when he was buried in Deansgrange Cemetery on the 10th of May. Henchy died leaving behind his wife Monica, his daughters, Mary and Deirdre, and his brother, Justice Séamus Henchy legacy of the supreme court. After his death, Henchy's family passed on a pastel on paper portrait made by Thomas Ryan to the National Library of Ireland, along with documents that record the life and legacy of the late Henchy. Henchy was a well accepted member of his community and his reputation and memory was and maintained positive, with The Irish Times' obituary of Henchy stating that, "Paddy Henchy will have little difficulty getting past St Peter." Six days after his death, historian Dr Brendan Ó Cathaoir eulogized Henchy by writing in The Irish Times that Henchy was "gentleman of the old school....always ready to give a word of advice and encouragement."

== Perceptions and legacy ==
Henchy is remembered for the lasting effect his work has had in improving Irish libraries. Adopting a policy of expansion, he pushed for the acquisition of the Kildare Street Club's building as an intended destination for the library's Manuscript Department and Genealogical Office, as well as the redevelopment of the National College of Art Building to suit future library purposes. The National Library of Ireland council of trustees, in its annual report for 1976, said of Henchy when he started his new position at Chester Beatty Library, "We deeply appreciate the zeal and energy displayed by Dr Henchy in his work for the strengthening of the staff, the improvement of the accommodation, services and collections of this library during his term of office. He laid the basis for many future projects."

Henchy is also remembered for his efforts to expand library usership, in particular his efforts to market the National Library of Ireland towards the public, which included a campaign of newspaper articles, radio interviews, and lectures that he himself undertook. Henchy's policy that extended library hours to include Saturdays is also considered a notable accomplishment and remains in place to this day.

Henchy's obituary in The Irish Times described him as an "urbane and scholarly," figure who enjoyed the outdoors, especially long strolls and fishing. He was well-versed in topics concerning nature and topography and would often take walks in the Wicklow Mountains and surrounding areas.

Henchy is also remembered for his work supporting Irish cultural works, both as a librarian and in his personal life. He was a supporter of the arts and artists, including poet Patrick Kavanagh.

Upon leaving the National Library of Ireland in 1976, Henchy identified Izaak Walton's The Compleat Angler as the single book he would take with him upon his departure.
