= Michael A. Fopp =

British museum director

Dr Michael A. Fopp is a retired museum director.

Michael Fopp is the son of an Australian Battle of Britain fighter pilot. He grew up surrounded by aeroplanes, but left the Reading Blue Coat School to follow a childhood dream of riding horses professionally. He was a member of the Mounted Branch of London’s Metropolitan Police for over 10 years. Those years were spent leading ceremonial celebrations, carrying out duties during riots and other public disorder events. This ended when he was seriously assaulted by rioters in 1979, an event so serious as to cause the death of Blair Peach and injury to many others.

During his police career he had permission to lecture and write about aviation history and, almost immediately after his hospitalisation joined the Royal Air Force Museum as Keeper of the Battle of Britain Collection in 1979. In 1984 he was awarded a master's degree by City University London for whom he was a visiting lecturer in Management Studies for 9 years. In 1985 he was appointed director of the London Transport Museum. He returned to the Royal Air Force Museum as Director in 1988 and finished his thesis "Museum & Gallery Management", gaining his PhD in 1989.

He was the director general of the RAF Museum's three sites – Hendon (London), Cosford and Stafford, all of which expanded during his tenure of over 22 years – retiring in 2010. He is past Chairman of the Air Safety Trust and the Air Pilots Trust, charities supporting flying scholarships, air safety and research.

For many years he spent his spare time flying a Lancair aircraft which he built himself over a period of 8 years. His book Managing Museums & Galleries, published by Routledge, was the first book to provide the reader with museum/gallery specific solutions to management problems. He is married to Rosemary, who is also a private pilot; they have one son.

In 2011, he was given an Award of Doctor of Science honoris causa by City University London.
