= Brendan O'Donoghue (civil servant) =

Irish senior civil servant (1942–2019)

- Born: 19 September 1942
- Died: 4 September 2019 (aged 76)
- Occupation: senior civil servant

Brendan O'Donoghue (19 September 1942 - 4 September 2019) was an Irish civil servant who served as secretary general of Department of the Environment and Director of the National Library of Ireland.

== Life ==
O'Donoghue was appointed as secretary general of Department of the Environment at the age of 48. In 1997, he took up the post of director of the National Library of Ireland until 2003. While at the Library, he oversaw the establishment of the National Photographic Archive which opened in 1998 in Temple Bar. From 1997 to 2001, he served as chair of the Irish Architectural Archive, and chaired the editorial committee of the Royal Irish Academy's Dictionary of Irish Biography.

== Work In Legislation ==
Before his time as a Director of the National Library Association, O'Donoghue worked as a civil servant in the “Department of Local Government in 1963 as an administrative officer”. He served in the Department of Local Government for three years before moving to the Department of Finance. He only worked a short two year post in this department from 1966 till 1968, before transferring back to the Department of Local Government, which was later renamed the Department of the Environment.

In 1983, fifteen years after he rejoined this department, O'Donoghue was appointed the position of assistant secretary and moved up to the position of secretary general in 1990. As secretary general passed acts such as the Water Pollution Act 1990, the Waste Management Act 1996 and the Environmental Protection Agency Act 1992, with the latter leading to the creation of the Environmental Protection Agency. O'Donoghue encouraged the transfer of "environmental directives of the European Communities into Irish law" and created legislation that meant the responsibility of planning decisions were to be in the hands of "an expert statutory board" rather than the hands of politicians. He spent over 20 years collecting information about the County Surveyors system in Ireland and the people behind it. In 2008, his book The Irish county surveyors 1834-1944 was published and contained all of the information around "the origins and development of the system; and the work of the county surveyors concerning road construction and maintenance, public buildings and other public works, and private practice in architecture and engineering". O'Donoghue also wrote a number of scholarly texts about engineering, including In Search of Fame and Fortune: The Leahy Family of Engineers and a biography about Sir Henry Augustus Robinson titled Activities Wise and Otherwise: The Career of Sir Henry Augustus Robinson, 1898-1922.
