= Córas Iompair Éireann =

Statutory transport organisation of Ireland

Córas Iompair Éireann CIÉ
- Type: Statutory Corporation
- Industry: Infrastructure & Public Transport State Administrator
- Predecessors: Great Southern Railways; Dublin United Transport Company; Great Northern Railway (1958)
- Founded: 1 January 1945; 81 years ago
- Headquarters: Dublin Heuston; Dublin 8; D08 E2CV
- Area served: Ireland
- Key people: Fiona Ross (Non-Executive Chairman)
- Revenue: ▲€1.315 billion (2018)
- Operating income: ▲€72.1 million (2018)
- Net income: ▲ -€35 million (2018)
- Owner: Government of Ireland (100%)
- Parent: Department of Transport
- Divisions: CIÉ Tours International
- Subsidiaries: Iarnród Éireann; Dublin Bus; Bus Éireann
- Website: www.cie.ie

Córas Iompair Éireann (Irish for 'Irish Transport System'), or CIÉ, is a statutory corporation of Ireland, answerable to the Irish Government and responsible for most public transport within the Republic of Ireland and jointly with its Northern Ireland counterpart, the Northern Ireland Transport Holding Company (which trades as Translink), for the railway service between Dublin and Belfast, via Drogheda, Dundalk, Newry and Portadown. The company is headquartered at Heuston Station, Dublin. It is a statutory corporation whose members are appointed by the Minister for Transport.

== Services ==
Since the enactment of the Transport (Re-organisation of Córas Iompair Éireann) Act, 1986, CIÉ has been the holding company for Bus Éireann, Dublin Bus and Iarnród Éireann/Irish Rail, the three largest internal transport companies in Ireland. It was originally to have operated the Luas tram system in Dublin, but that project was transferred to the newly created Railway Procurement Agency (RPA).

CIÉ's services are provided through three operating companies:

- Dublin Bus, which provides bus services in the Greater Dublin Area, including most bus services within Dublin city and the County Dublin;
- Bus Éireann, which provides intercity and regional bus services outside Dublin city and county and from Dublin to the rest of Ireland, as well as operating the city buses in Cork, Limerick, Waterford, and Galway and a number of other small urban bus systems;
- Iarnród Éireann, which operates InterCity, Commuter and DART trains, and – together with NI Railways – the Dublin–Belfast Enterprise train service. Iarnród Éireann also operates Rosslare Europort.

CIÉ is responsible for the overall strategy of the group. It owns all fixed assets used by the three companies, such as railway lines and stations, the latter being dealt with through the Group Property division. It also operates an international tour division, CIÉ Tours International. CIÉ's vast number of advertising sites are organised through Commuter Advertising Network (CAN), since the mid-1990s employing an external company (currently Global Ireland) to manage them. There are also a number of shared services provided by CIÉ to its three operating companies.

Other than in the railway sector, CIÉ is not a monopoly provider of public transport services: a number of other operators exist; however, under the Transport Act, 1932, these may not compete directly on any route for which CIÉ has been granted a licence. However, legislation was enacted in 2013 to provide for the tendering of 10% of routes operated by Dublin Bus and Bus Éireann. This public competition includes these two operators, along with private operators such as Go-Ahead Ireland, and was completed in January 2019.

== History ==
"The Flying Snail" Logo 1944–1964

Córas Iompair Éireann (CIÉ) was formed as a private company by the Transport Act 1944 and incorporated the Great Southern Railways Company and Dublin United Transport Company, adopting the logo of the latter company (the so-called "flying snail".) CIÉ came into being on 1 January 1945.

Great Southern Railways (GSR) was incorporated in 1925, having been Great Southern Railway since 1924. Essentially the GSR became – especially as it started to broaden its business interests into road transport – a monopoly transport operator. The Transport Act 1950 amalgamated CIÉ and the Grand Canal Company and formally nationalised CIÉ, changing its structure from that of a private limited company to a corporation under a board appointed by the Minister for Transport. The Great Northern Railway Act 1958 and the Transport Act (Northern Ireland) 1958 (c. 15 (N.I.)), passed by the Parliament of Northern Ireland, transferred the lines of the Great Northern Railway Board in the Republic of Ireland (including County Donegal) to CIÉ.

Micheal O'Riain, a transport professional, and author of "On the Move-Córas Iompair Éireann 1945-1995", wrote of CIÉs ongoing problems in Dublin in the early 1970s:

In 1972/73, Dublin bus services turned from small but regular profits into permanent loss. Traffic logjams were occurring at peak periods; since the mid-1960s industrial relations were bad; technically the buses were unsatisfactory; passengers were decreasing. CIÉ argued that efficient bus services required one-person operation of double deckers, new buses to reduce costs and measures to improve traffic flow. In combination these steps would recover lost traffic, improve industrial relations and restore the services to acceptable financial performance.

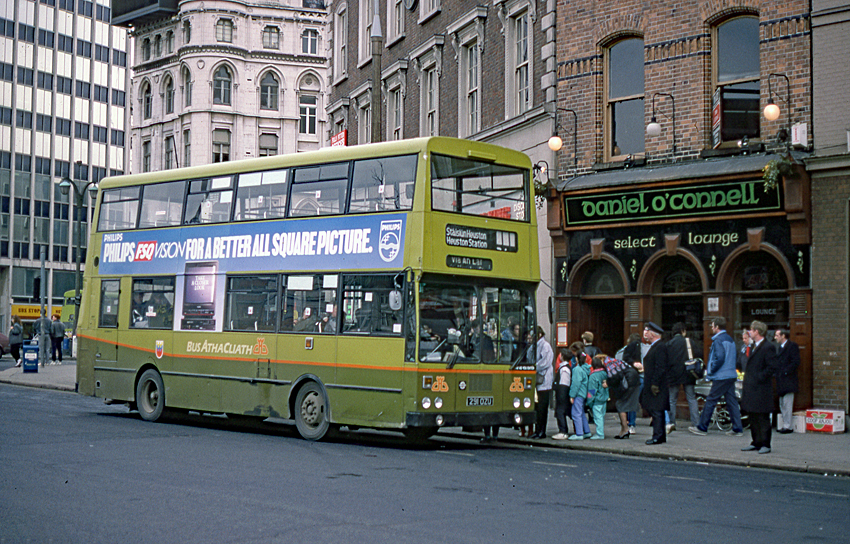
A Bombardier KD bus on Aston Quay, Dublin in 1988

In its Annual Report for 1982, CIE stated that the intake of "187 Bombardier buses during the year (brought) the total on Dublin City Services to 276 at 31 December 1982." It noted that the upgrading of the fleet had increased the availability and the reliability of buses across the city.

Until 1986, CIÉ operated as a single legal entity, although it was internally organised into rail services and two bus divisions – Dublin City Services and Provincial Services. The vast majority of services were branded CIÉ, although long-distance provincial buses were branded "Expressway" and Dublin electric trains DART. In 1987, CIÉ was reorganised into a holding company and three operating companies. In 1990, it sold its nine Great Southern Hotels, including its hotel in Derry, to Aer Rianta, the airports authority.

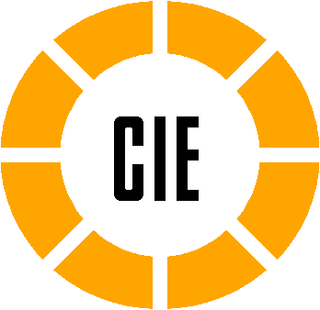
"The Broken Wheel" Logo introduced in 1964 and modernised in 2000

The company does not run any services on Christmas Day.

== Financial losses and the future ==
CIÉ was established to provide road and railway transport, and later took on some of the canals and ports. It was empowered as both a provider and a licensor of other providers.

For most of its existence, CIÉ, in particular its railways division, made large losses and was subsidised by the taxpayer. This provoked demands from the public and politicians to "make CIÉ pay". In a similar pattern to that seen in many other states, Ireland's railways were accordingly rationalised, and suffered severe cutbacks while at the same time the road division was expanded.

The Baker Tilly report found an amount of corporate malpractice in 2004–08. CIÉ did not pass on the report to the Minister for Transport until it was mentioned in the media.

Losses in 2009:

- Iarnród Éireann/Irish Rail — €4.0m
- Bus Éireann — €54.1m

The biggest change to CIÉ's operational structure since 1987 came with the establishment of the National Transport Authority in December 2009, which has powers over CIÉ's operations in the Greater Dublin Area. The Dublin Transport Authority Act 2008 also gives the Minister for Transport instead of the chairman of CIÉ the power to appoint the directors of the subsidiary companies. CIÉ receives public service obligation payments to support the provision of services on most of its routes.

In 2013, Dublin Bus and Bus Éireann made a profit of €500,000 and €400,000 respectively, for the first time in a number of years.

== See also ==
- Coaching stock of Ireland
- Diesel locomotives of Ireland
- Multiple units of Ireland
- Rail transport in Ireland
- Steam locomotives of Ireland
- Transport in Ireland
