= National Photographic Archive =

Archive in Dublin, Ireland

- Cartlann Grianghrafadóireachta Náisiúnta
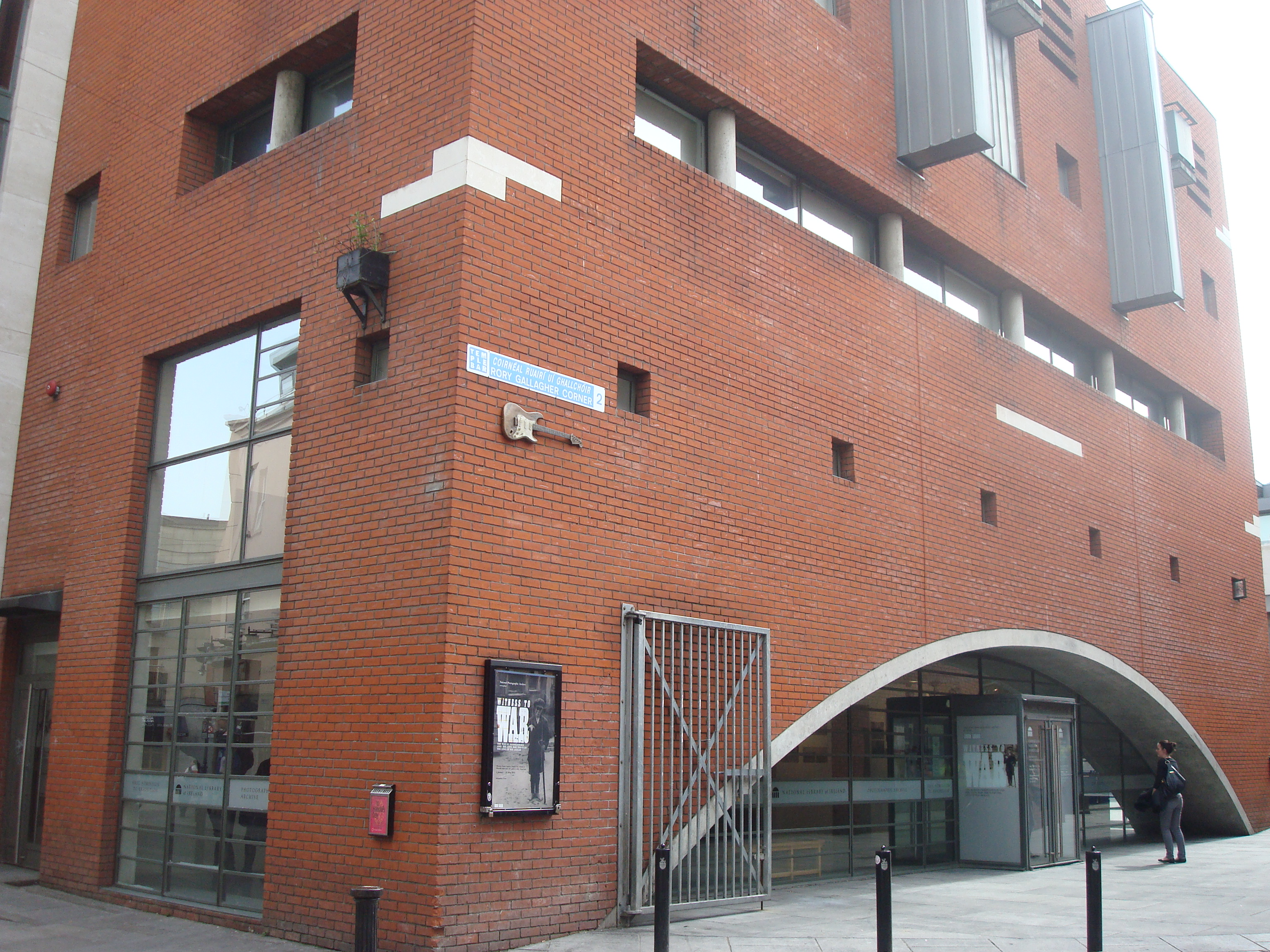

- Location within Central Dublin
- Established: 1998
- Location: Meeting House Square, Dublin, Ireland
- Coordinates: 53.345279°N 6.265375°W
- Type: Photo archive
- Public transit access: Wellington Quay bus stop Jervis Luas stop (Red Line)

The National Photographic Archive (Irish: Cartlann Grianghrafadóireachta Náisiúnta) is a photography archive located in Temple Bar in Dublin, Ireland. The archive, which opened in 1998, holds the photographic collections of the National Library of Ireland (NLI). It operates a reading room and exhibition gallery. The gallery's exhibition space hosts photographic exhibitions – often relating to the NLI's collections.
