= Maggie Appleton =

Museum director

Margaret Mary Appleton MBE (born 21 August 1965) is an English museum director. She has been the chief executive officer of the RAF Museum since 2015.

== Early life and education ==
Appleton was born in Wyndham and brought up in Kirkham, Lancashire. Her father died when she was six. She and her sister were brought up by their mother.

Appleton attended Willow Road Catholic Primary School. Her secondary education took place at Lark Hill Newman College. In 1984, she accepted a place at Liverpool University where she studied medieval and modern history. After graduating, she worked as a medical sales rep and volunteered at Peterborough Museum Appleton completed a MSc in Heritage Management from Birmingham University's Ironbridge Institute.

== Career ==
Appleton began her career in museums at the Royal Armouries. In 1991, she moved to Stevenage Museum and was there for 11 years. She left in 2003 to become the director of museums for Luton Museum Service. While there, she oversaw a major renovation of Stockwood Discovery Centre and the acquisition of the medieval Wenlock Jug. In 2008, she set up Luton Culture, an independent charitable trust, and became its first chief executive. Appleton was appointed CEO of the RAF Museum in October 2014. As the CEO, she led the Museum's £26M transformation to mark the centenary of the Royal Air Force in 2018. She served as the president of the Museums Association between 2018 and 2021.

== Awards ==
Appleton was appointed a Member of the Order of the British Empire (MBE) in the 2012 New Year Honours for services to museums and heritage. She is an honorary graduate of the University of Middlesex.
