= Patricia Donlon =

Irish librarian (1943–2026)

- Born: 28 January 1943; Dublin, Ireland
- Died: 23 July 2026 (aged 83)
- Education: University College Dublin
- Occupation: Academic librarian
- Employers: Royal Irish Academy; Chester Beatty Library; National Library of Ireland

Patricia Anne Donlon (née McCarthy; 28 January 1943 – 23 July 2026) was an Irish librarian and academic, who was director of the National Library of Ireland, the first woman to hold that post. She was also the first woman to be appointed director to an Irish national institution.

== Background and early career ==
Patricia Anne McCarthy was born in Dublin, Ireland on 28 January 1943, to parents Patrick Joseph McCarthy and Marcella Garr. Her father worked as a Garda. As a young child, Donlon attended Miss McGuire's school in Dolphin's Barn, where she discovered her love of reading. She then attended Holy Faith Convent, the Coombe, where she excelled academically.

Donlon studied French and Spanish for her undergraduate degree at University College Dublin, and graduated with honours in 1964. She later undertook a doctorate degree in Spanish literature in 1974, and a diploma in Library and Information Studies in 1979, both also in UCD.

She began her professional career working as a researcher at RTÉ in 1964. Following her diploma in Library and Information Studies in University College Dublin, Donlon's career in the library field began with a job as a library assistant at the Royal Veterinary College in Ballsbridge. She then took a job at the Royal Irish Academy in 1979. She became a reference librarian and curator of the Western Collection at the Chester Beatty Library in 1981.

In September 1965, she married Phelim Donlon, a former Arts Council drama officer, when she was 22 years old. The couple had two daughters, Lorna and Sinéad. Phelim died in December 2014.

== Role at the National Library of Ireland: 1989–1997 ==
When Donlon was appointed to the role of director in 1989, almost a year after the last director had retired, the National Library of Ireland was an institution characterised by an absence of sufficient staff, resources, storage capacity, and financing. The first major step Donlon took to improve matters at the NLI was the establishment of new security measures to protect the collections from being stolen. Parallel to increased security, inventory was also carried out to concretely determine how much loss the collections had suffered. This was no easy endeavour, considering the collections, which, at the time, amounted to five million items, were either catalogued on paper or not catalogued at all.

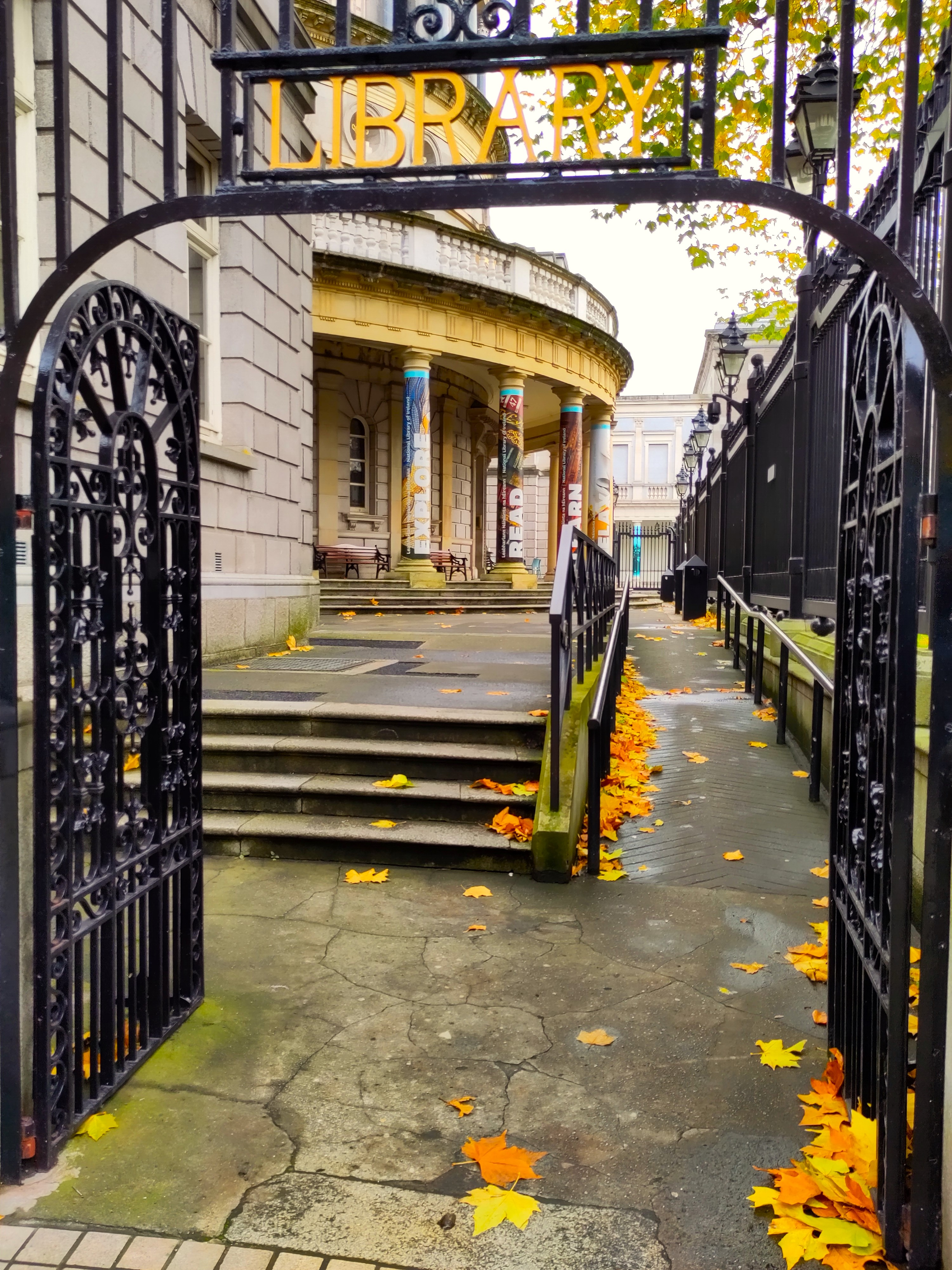
An autumnal view of the gate and the main building of the National Library of Ireland.

The year 1991 marked the official opening of the Manuscript Reading Room housed in the former location of the Kildare Street Club at 2-3 Kildare Street. In the same year, after the stipulated fifty-year period ended, the NLI opened the letters Paul Léon, friend, literary agent and legal consultant to James Joyce, had bequeathed to the Library. The correspondence was subsequently made available to the public and a detailed catalogue entitled The James Joyce-Paul Léon Papers in the National Library of Ireland, with a foreword by Donlon, was published in 1992.

Under Donlon's leadership, the National Library of Ireland was the first Irish institution to declare its mission and aims for the future with the publication of its Strategic Plan 1992-1997. In the document, which immediately received financial support from the government, the NLI commits to innovating aspects such as its service offering, use of information technology, and structural facilities. When Donlon joined the NLI, there were no computers in the Library. With the help of IBM, information technology could be introduced, enabling digital cataloguing, which would eventually render inventory by hand unnecessary.

In 1994, the NLI showcased key items from their collections in an exhibition and associated publication entitled Treasures from the National Library. She was also the first woman to be appointed Chief Herald of Ireland, a position which is also granted by the NLI. In 1997, as Donlon's final act as Chief Herald of Ireland before her retirement, she bestowed a coat of arms on Mary Robinson, who was the President of Ireland at the time.

Donlon created a collection of over 1500 works of children’s literature for the National Library of Ireland during her tenure, which contains many examples of work by her former student Marita Conlon-McKenna. This collection contains books by Irish writers and/or illustrators, or authors with Irish connections. During her time as director, she made an effort to collect more materials and works from Irish artists, and appealed to living Irish writers to donate their manuscripts to the NLI's collection. Among her acquisitions before her retirement is the archive of Irish author and dramatist Hugh Leonard, which she considered a significant achievement from her tenure.

She also served as executive member of various national and international organisations. By 1997, when she retired from her position as director for health reasons, she is regarded as having significantly reformed the Library despite continued underfunding.

== Later career and death ==
After leaving the directorship of the NLI, Donlon was a senior visiting fellow at the Institute of Irish Studies, Queen's University, in Belfast. While there, she wrote a history on children's literature in Ireland. In 1997, she won the Annual Children's Books Ireland Award, from the Children's Literature Association of Ireland (formed by the merger of the Children's Literature Association of Ireland, which she helped to found in 1986, and the Irish Children's Book Trust). Donlon has been outspoken about the importance of children's literature in wider literary circles and has emphasised the importance of its inclusion in library collection development. She taught a Children’s Literature program at University College Dublin. Amongst her past students is Irish author Marita Conlon-McKenna, who credited Donlon with encouraging her to pursue publishing her first children’s novel, Under The Hawthorn Tree.

From 1998 to 1999, she held the Sandars Readership in Bibliography lecturing on "In Fairyland: Irish Illustrators of Children’s Books 1880's to 1950's."

Donlon was also selected as a judge for the 1998/99 Irish Literature Prizes.

In 2000, Donlon was appointed to the Heritage Council by the then Minister for Arts, Heritage, Gaeltacht and the Islands, Ms de Valera.

In 2007, Donlon became director of the Tyrone Guthrie Centre in Annaghmakerrig, an artists' retreat in County Monaghan. During her time there, she created ArtLog, a digital archive that records the creative processes of the artists based at the Centre. Donlon recognised that in contemporary artistic scene, the public often only receives the finished artwork, without the chance to perceive the creative process of the artist, which leads to the development of a certain type of artwork. Through collaboration with the Digital Media Centre in Dublin, ArtLog enables artists-in-residence to document their imaginative concepts, recording and conserving artistic thought for future generations. Donlon retired as Director of the Centre in 2011, after having overseen the expansion of the facility with the addition of the new studios and improved services and comforts.

In 2018, Donlon was appointed Chairperson of the Museum of Childhood Ireland, Músaem Óige na hÉireann Ireland's first islandwide and diaspora, historic to contemporary, museum of children and childhood, and continued as an honorary member.

Donlon participated in the third edition of the Phelim Donlon Playwright's Bursary and Residency for emerging writers. The bursary was established by the Irish Theatre Institute (ITI) in partnership with the Tyrone Guthrie Centre in 2015–2016, to honour the memory of Phelim Donlon, former Drama Officer in the Arts Council, dedicated member of the ITI and Donlon's husband. She presented the bursary and sat on the panel that selected Amy Conroy, artistic director, as the winner.

Donlon died on 23 July 2026, at the age of 83.
