= Museum of Literature Ireland =

Literary museum in Dublin, Ireland

Museum of Literature Ireland (MoLI)
- Músaem Litríochta na hÉireann

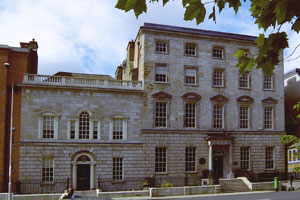
- Newman House, home of the museum, and previously of UCD; attended by James Joyce

- Location within Central Dublin Location within Dublin
- Established: September 2019
- Location: 86 St Stephen's Green, Dublin, Ireland
- Coordinates: 53°20′12″N 06°15′37″W
- Type: Literary
- Visitors: nearly 40,000 (first six months)
- Director: Simon O'Connor
- Public transit access: Dublin Pearse; St Stephen's Green (Green Line)
- Website: moli.ie

The Museum of Literature Ireland (Irish: Músaem Litríochta na hÉireann), branded MoLI in an homage to Molly Bloom, is a literary museum in Dublin, Ireland. It opened in September 2019. The museum is a partnership between the National Library of Ireland and University College Dublin (UCD). It is located in UCD's Newman House in St Stephen's Green. It holds a permanent collection of James Joyce–related material, including his "Copy No. 1" of Ulysses, and revolving exhibitions on other Irish literary figures. With a range of audio and immersive displays, it has been nominated for and won a number of awards for design and architecture.

== History ==
The idea of a literary centre at Newman House began with a discussion between Eamonn Ceannt, Bursar / Vice-President for Capital Development of University College Dublin, and a representative of the National Library of Ireland, at Bewley's Café. Originally, it was planned as a new cultural institution focusing on James Joyce. The charitable foundation of Martin Naughton and his wife funded an initial study, and after discussion with Failte Ireland, which offered to provide funding to the tune of 2.5 million euro, the concept was expanded to take in Irish literature in general. In formulating a name for the expanded project, a Joycean link was deemed important, so a name was devised, the acronym of which would relate to his work – hence MoLI (pronounced "Molly") in homage to Molly Bloom.

The museum architectural project began in 2012, and design was worked on from 2014, based on a conversion of the Newman House complex, the original home of University College Dublin, on St Stephen's Green. The exhibition design was developed by Ralph Appelbaum Associates, with the architectural design by Scott Tallon Walker. Emphasis was placed on auditory material and potential for visitor interaction.

The construction project budget was just over 10 million euro, for a floor area of 3,600 m^{2} (39,000 sq ft), of which about 500 m^{2} (5,400 sq ft) was new building, including a mezzanine addition. A major part of the work was the development of a museum-grade central stairway, a lift and modern fire escape provisions.

The museum's first director is Simon O'Connor, who previously worked as part of the founding team of The Little Museum of Dublin.

Originally planned to open in the spring of 2019, MoLI was launched with an evening opening on Culture Night, 20 September 2019, with general opening from the following day. Admission is paid.

== Experience and holdings ==
Newman House is a complex of two Georgian houses and the original university Aula Maxima (Great Hall), and all of this space, with some new "insertions", is used for the museum. MoLI is laid out over three floors, each with a theme. The ground floor is themed place and contains immersive displays, the first voice and the second inspiration, which includes an area for visitors to produce their own work.

MoLI is able to draw on the collections of the National Library, and the Special Collections of UCD Library. Two central elements of the exhibitions are Joyce's "Copy No. 1" of Ulysses, which he inscribed to a patron, Harriet Weaver, and the Riverrun of Language, named from the first word of Joyce's Finnegans Wake, which responds to visitor movements with "sound showers of spoken literature and folklore".

=== Exhibitions ===
The first of MoLI's revolving exhibitions, in place for the opening, was on Kate O'Brien, and this was followed by one on Nuala O'Faolain. Also in place for the launch was a section on Young Adult Fiction, including general fiction, science fiction and fantasy.

In March 2023, for the 100th anniversary of Brendan Behan's birth, MoLI, in collaboration with novelist Patrick McCabe, opened The Holy Hour, an audiovisual installation reframing Behan's life and work.

== Education ==
The museum planned from before opening for both a specialist research library and outreach programmes for adults and school children.

== Garden and ancillary facilities ==
Ancillary public facilities are on the lower ground floor, while offices are on a closed third floor. The museum's Readers Garden, which is also accessible from the Iveagh Gardens public park, contains a courtyard aspect of the café and places to read. Operation of the museum café, The Commons, on the lower ground floor, and planned to have direct access from the street and Iveagh Gardens, is contracted to Peaches and Domini Kemp. The museum shop is in the interior of the lower floor.

== Governance and operations ==
The museum premises are owned by UCD, and it is a collaboration between the university and the National Library of Ireland. It is operated by a UCD company, Newman House Literary Centre, CLG, which has a board of up to seven members, all unpaid: up to four delegates of UCD, two of the National Library, and an independent chair (appointed by UCD).

== Recognition ==
The design received an Honourable Mention from Creative Review magazine. It also won a MUSE Design Award for Interior Design in 2020, and a Good Design (Environments) Award from The European Centre for Architecture, Art, Design and Urban Studies. The adaptation work on the building was a shortlisted nominee for the Public Choice Award of the Royal Institute of the Architects of Ireland 2020.

== Media ==
The design, building and launch of the museum were presented in a documentary, Making a Museum: The Story of MoLI, by Luke McManus, broadcast on RTÉ Television on Bloomsday 2020.

The museum has had a digital radio station, RadioMoLI, from before its opening, and a dedicated broadcasting room was planned. For its reopening after COVID-19 pandemic closure, it produced a short film, primarily of its garden, based around a reading of a short piece from Time and the Gods by the Anglo-Irish writer Lord Dunsany.

== See also ==
- James Joyce Centre
- James Joyce Tower and Museum
