= Sandra Collins (librarian) =

Irish librarian

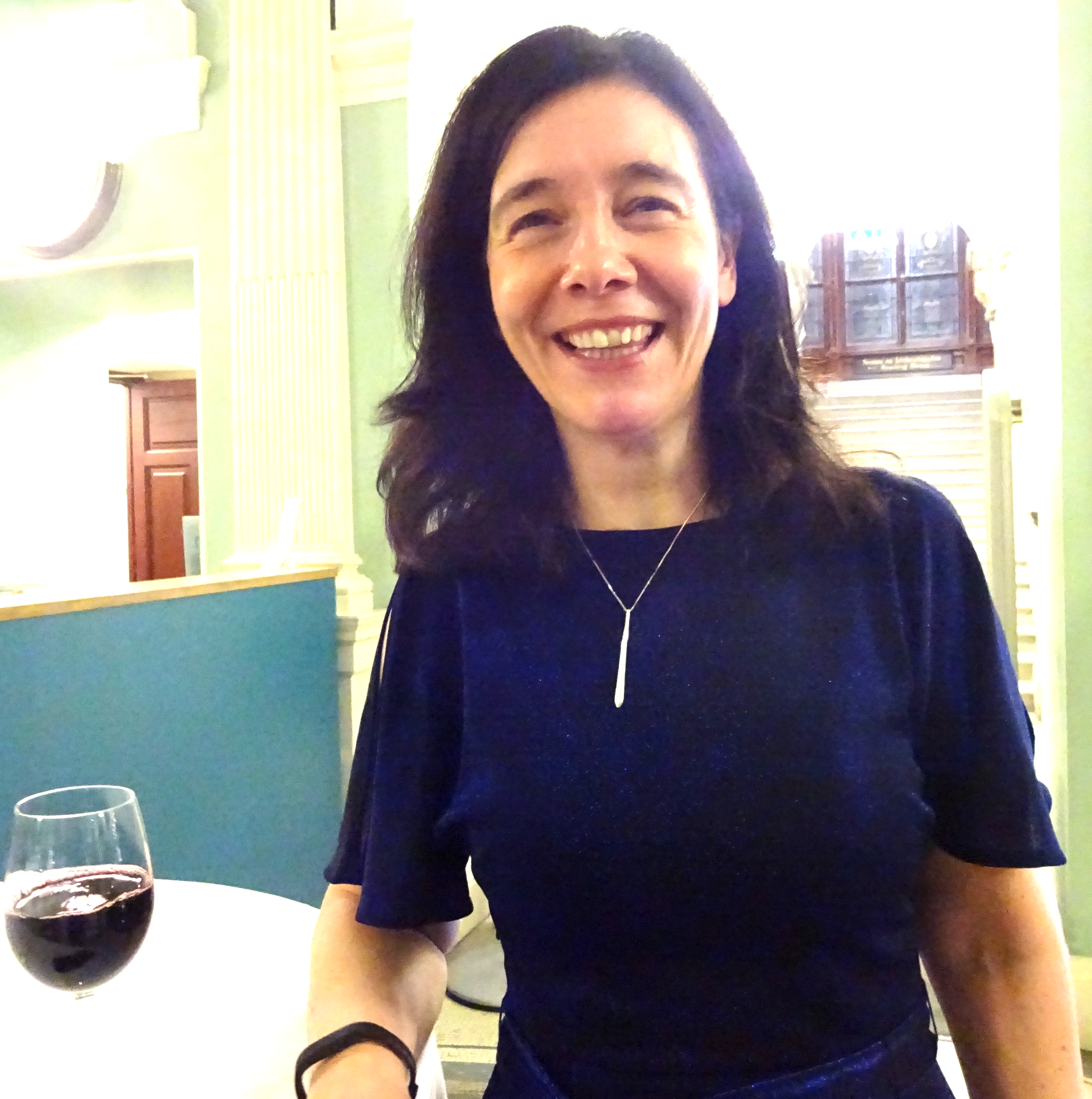
- Born: 16 July 1970 (age 56)
- Education: University College Dublin (BSc, PhD)
- Occupation: Academic librarian
- Employers: National Library of Ireland; University College Dublin

Sandra Collins (born 16 July 1970) is an Irish mathematician and leading academic librarian, who is the university librarian of University College Dublin, Ireland's largest university, since 2022. She was director of the National Library of Ireland from 2015.

== Career ==
Collins attended University College Dublin, graduating with a BSc in Mathematics and Mathematical Physics in 1991, and receiving a PhD in Nonlinear Fluid Dynamics in 1996.

She worked as a lecturer in mathematics at Dublin City University, with Ericsson, and as director of the Digital Repository of Ireland at the Royal Irish Academy.

She was appointed director of the National Library of Ireland in 2015, for a five-year term, and agreed a second term from 2020. She has been the university librarian at University College Dublin since 2022.

== Recognition ==
Collins received three Ireland eGovernment awards for collaborative digital cultural projects: 'Promoting Ireland Overseas', 'Open Source', and 'Overall Winner'. She received the UCD Alumni Award in Research, Innovation and Impact in 2020.
