= Fiona Ross (public servant) =

Irish public servant

- Occupation: Public servant

Fiona Ross is an Irish public servant, and former director of the National Library of Ireland.

== Career ==
Fiona Ross served as the director of the National Library of Ireland from 2010 to 2014. From 2015 to 2018 she served as a director of the National Transport Authority. In 2018, she was appointed chair of CIÉ. Ross was awarded a masters in governance and public policy from Queen's University Belfast, and was a lecturer in the Irish Management Institute and University College Dublin. In 2021, Ross was appointed chairperson of the National Paediatric Hospital Development Board.
