= Royal Air Force Museum =

Museum dedicated to the Royal Air Force

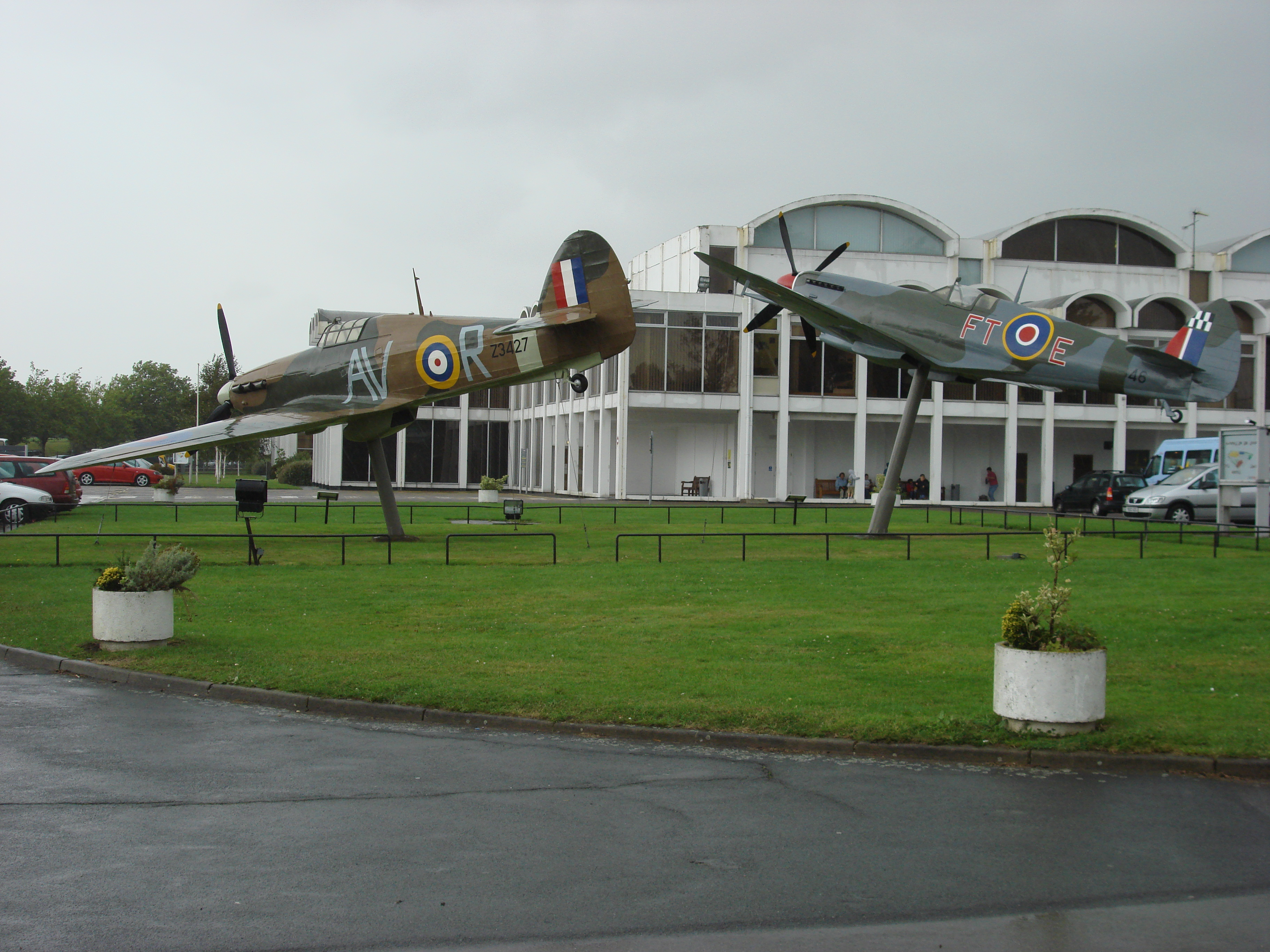
The museum's London site, with replica Supermarine Spitfire and Hawker Hurricane aircraft outside, 2009

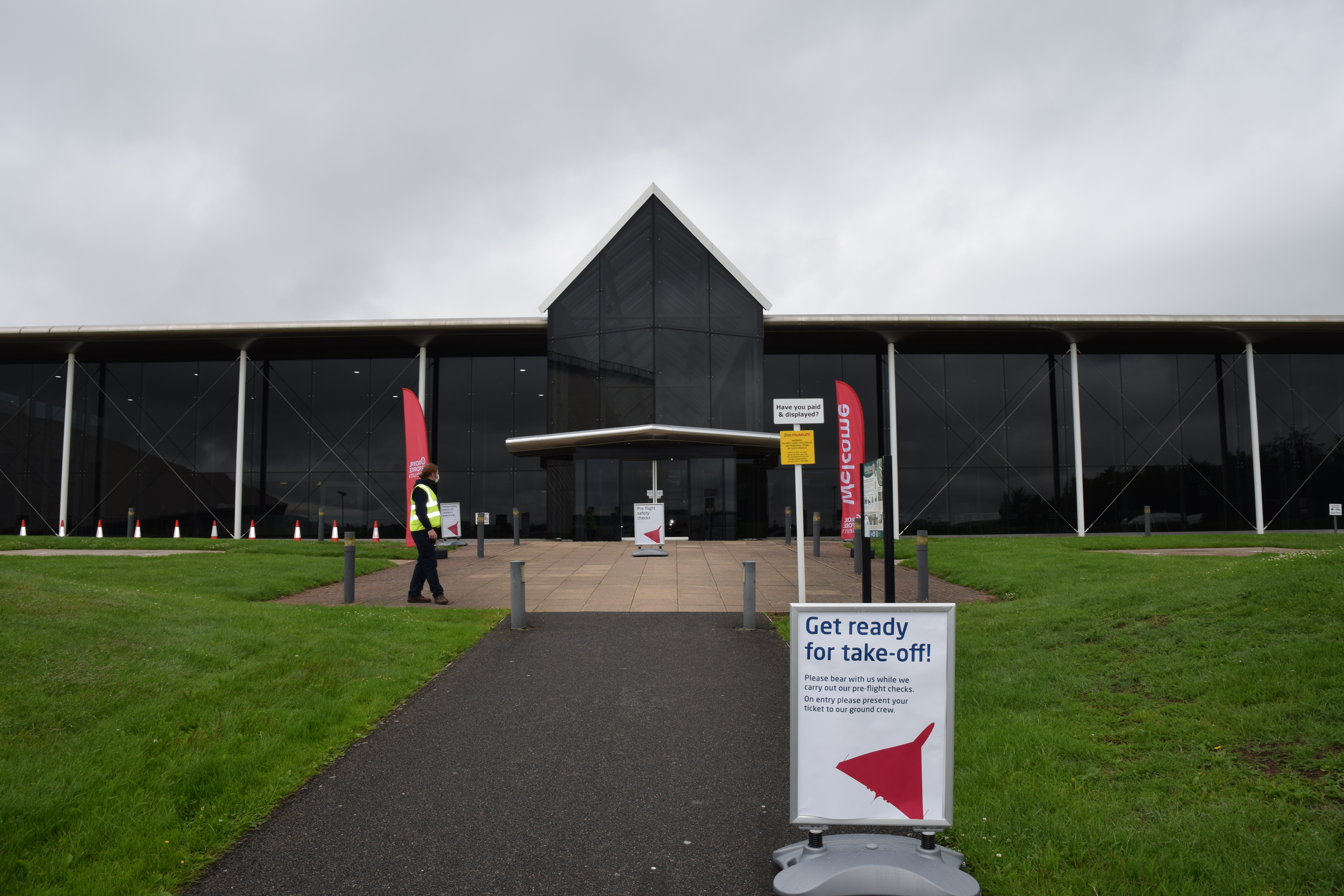
The entrance to the museum's site at RAF Cosford in Shropshire, 2020

The Royal Air Force Museum is a museum dedicated to the Royal Air Force in the United Kingdom. The museum is a non-departmental public body and is a registered charity. It has two public sites, Royal Air Force Museum London and Royal Air Force Museum Midlands at RAF Cosford in Shropshire.

== History ==
The idea of an RAF Museum was approved by the Air Council in 1931. However the Council only established the museum in 1964 after the idea was proposed by a historical committee chaired by Sir Dermot Boyle. The museum began collecting artefacts, which were initially stored at RAF Henlow. Land at the former Hendon Aerodrome in Colindale, London, was leased from the Ministry of Defence and the museum was opened there by Queen Elizabeth II in 1972 with 36 aircraft on display.

The museum was part of the Ministry of Defence until it was split off and became a non-departmental public body in 1984. The Cosford Aerospace Museum formally merged with the RAF Museum and became its second public site in 1998.

The current governing document of the museum is a Royal charter granted in 2021. In the financial year ending 2023, the museum had an income of £19.8 million. It had 202 employees, assisted by 384 volunteers, and is governed by a group of 11 trustees. Currently, the museum's collection includes around 130 aircraft.

A former site of the museum was at Cardington, Bedfordshire; this housed both the conservation centre and the museum's reserve collection. In 2002 a new conservation centre was opened at Cosford. This facility cost £2.4 million; it was opened by Marshal of the Royal Air Force Sir Michael Beetham and is named after him. The museum's reserve collection was moved to a warehouse at MOD Stafford, a current military base; this is not open to the public.

== See also ==
- Simon Greenish, former Director of Collections
- Maggie Appleton, CEO
