= National Library of Ireland =

Irish heritage institution and repository

Coordinates: 53°20′28″N 6°15′16″W

- Leabharlann Náisiúnta na hÉireann

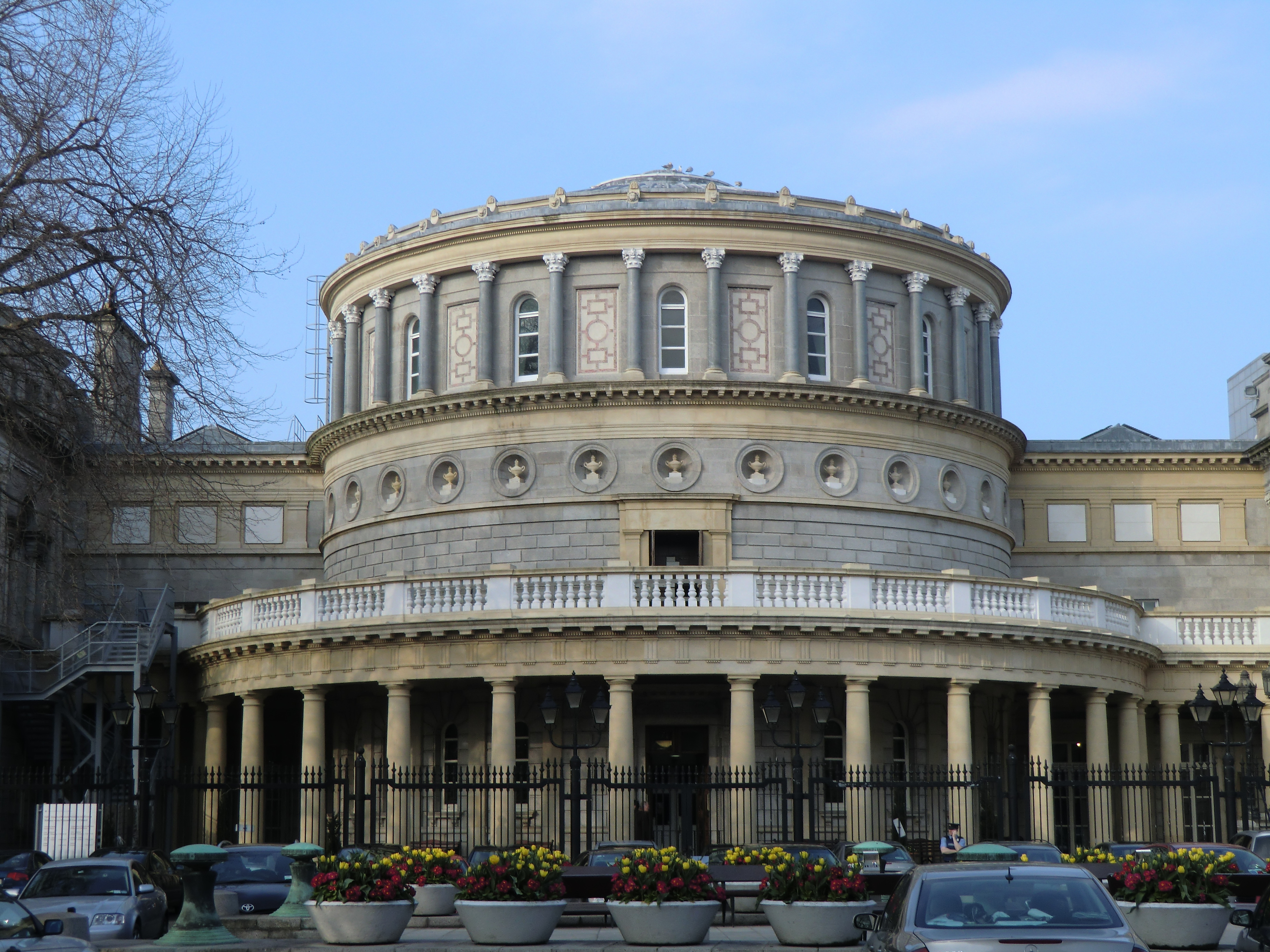
- The front façade of the library, 2011
- Location: Kildare Street, Dublin, Ireland
- Established: 1877; 149 years ago

Collection
- Items collected: Books, journals, newspapers, magazines, manuscripts, maps, prints and drawings, printed music, photographs, ephemera, and websites and databases
- Size: estimated 8 million items
- Legal deposit: Yes, since 1927

Access and use
- Access requirements: Free. Open to all those who wish to consult the collections for material not otherwise available through the public library service or an academic library.

Other information
- Director: Audrey Whitty (February 2023–)
- Website: www.nli.ie

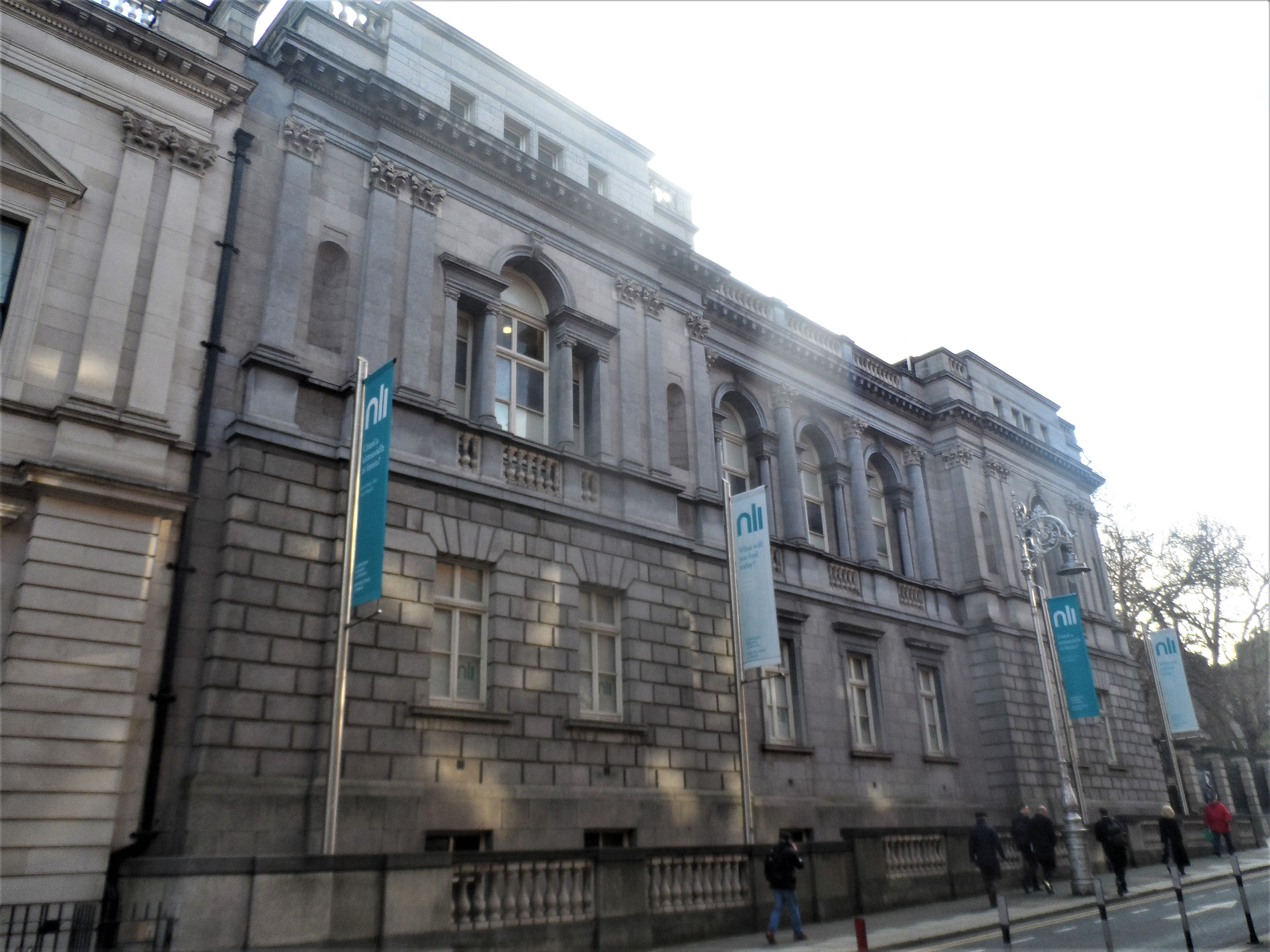
View on Kildare Street of the NLI

The National Library of Ireland (NLI; Irish: Leabharlann Náisiúnta na hÉireann) is Ireland's national library located in Dublin, in a building designed by Thomas Newenham Deane. The mission of the National Library of Ireland is "To collect, preserve, promote and make accessible the documentary and intellectual record of the life of Ireland and to contribute to the provision of access to the larger universe of recorded knowledge."

The library is a reference library and, as such, does not lend. It has a large quantity of Irish and Irish-related material which can be consulted without charge; this includes books, maps, manuscripts, music, newspapers, periodicals and photographs. Included in its collections are materials issued by private as well as government publishers. Among the library's major holdings are an archive of Irish newspapers and collections donated by individual authors or their estates. The library is also the ISSN National Centre for Ireland.

The office of the Chief Herald of Ireland, the National Photographic Archive and the Museum of Literature Ireland are functions of the library, the latter in partnership with University College Dublin. The library also holds exhibitions, and provides a number of other services including genealogy research tools and support. The Minister for Culture, Communications and Sport is the member of the Government of Ireland responsible for the library.

The main library building is on Kildare Street, adjacent to Leinster House and the archaeology section of the National Museum of Ireland.

== History ==
The library building, as well as its sister building the National Museum of Ireland – Archaeology which mirrors it across the front of Leinster House, were erected in 1890 and faced with Leinster granite, while "buff-coloured micaceous Mount Charles sandstone from Donegal was used on the upper sotreys and for dressings around the doors and windows." According to Wyse Jackson, curator of the Geological Museum at Trinity College Dublin, over 3,000 tons of the sandstone were transported to Dublin and dressed on site.

The National Library of Ireland was established by the Dublin Science and Art Museum Act 1877, which provided that the bulk of the collections in the possession of the Royal Dublin Society, should be vested in the then Department of Science and Art for the benefit of the public and of the Society, and for the purposes of the Act.

An Agreement of 1881 provided that the Library should operate under the superintendence of a Council of twelve Trustees, eight of whom were appointed by the Society and four by the Government; this Agreement also conferred on the Trustees the duty of appointing the officers of the Library. This arrangement remained in place until the library became an autonomous cultural institution in 2005.

After the foundation of the Irish Free State in 1924/5 the Library was transferred to the Department of Education under which it remained until 1986 when it was transferred to the Department of the Taoiseach. In 1927 the Library was granted legal deposit status under the Industrial and Commercial Property (Protection) Act 1927. In 1992 responsibility for the Library was transferred to the newly established Department of Arts, Culture and the Gaeltacht (now the Department of Culture, Communications and Sport) and on 3 May 2005 became an autonomous cultural institution under the National Cultural Institutions Act 1997.

=== Structural decay ===
By 1993, the Mount Charles sandstone which had been used to face the library building (as well as that of National Museum of Ireland – Archaeology) had begun to break up through the "precipitation of salts within the fabric of the rock". The sandstone had been badly affected by the coal-polluted atmosphere in Dublin over the century it had remained in situ, and was replaced in the 1960s by a grey limestone from Ardbraccan, County Meath. As of 1993, Wyse Jackson noted that "Close examinations of the stone remaining on the National Museum shows obvious decay and exfoliation of the outer layers of the rock, caused by the breakdown of the ferrous cement used to bind the sand grains together". Wyse Jackson made the note that the same rock had not been broken down by the atmosphere or pollutants in its native County Donegal where a number of buildings constructed as early as 1820 were still extant.

== Governance ==
The library is governed by a board, with day-to-day management in the hands of a director and a number of heads of functions. Directors of the library have included:

- Thomas William Lyster (1895–1920)
- Robert Lloyd Praeger (1920–24)
- Richard Irvine Best (1924–40)
- Richard J. Hayes (1940–67)
- Michael Hewson (1982–88)
- Patricia Donlon (1989–97)
- Brendan O'Donoghue (1997–2003)
- Aongus Ó hAonghusa (2003–09)
- Fiona Ross (2010–14)
- Sandra Collins (2015–21)

After a period under an acting director, in December 2022, the library announced that Audrey Whitty, deputy director of the National Museum of Ireland, would assume the office of director in early 2023.

== Collections ==
=== Basis and legal deposit ===
The collection began with the transfer of books and papers from the Royal Dublin Society, and was significantly boosted by the addition of the library as a copyright library for Ireland from 1927 (by contrast, the library of Trinity College Dublin was already a copyright library for the UK and Ireland, a status it retains). The National Cultural Institutions Act 1997 mandated that the National Library of Ireland (NLI) collect all materials relating to Ireland to provide an accurate record of Irish output. As according to Irish copyright law (Section 198 of the Copyright and Related Rights Act), the National Library of Ireland is entitled to claim a copy of every book published in Ireland.

=== Major collections ===
The library holds over 12 million items. The main collection is a combination of stock transferred from the Royal Dublin Society, including the Joly collection (25,000 volumes), later acquisitions, and copyright deposits of most printed, and some other, works published in Ireland since 1927. The library purchases content from Northern Ireland, and attempts to collect all publications in Irish, and acquires a limited supply from further afield. The book collection numbers around 1 million volumes, principally sourced from the RDS legacy and legal deposit copies. Other major collections include serials (recurrent publications other than newspapers, including magazines, journals and annual reports), maps and drawings, Government and other public sector publications, manuscripts, and original and microfilmed newspapers. The NLI holds over 2,785 subject items related to 20th century Irish poets, and is a major source for poetry by Irish writers.

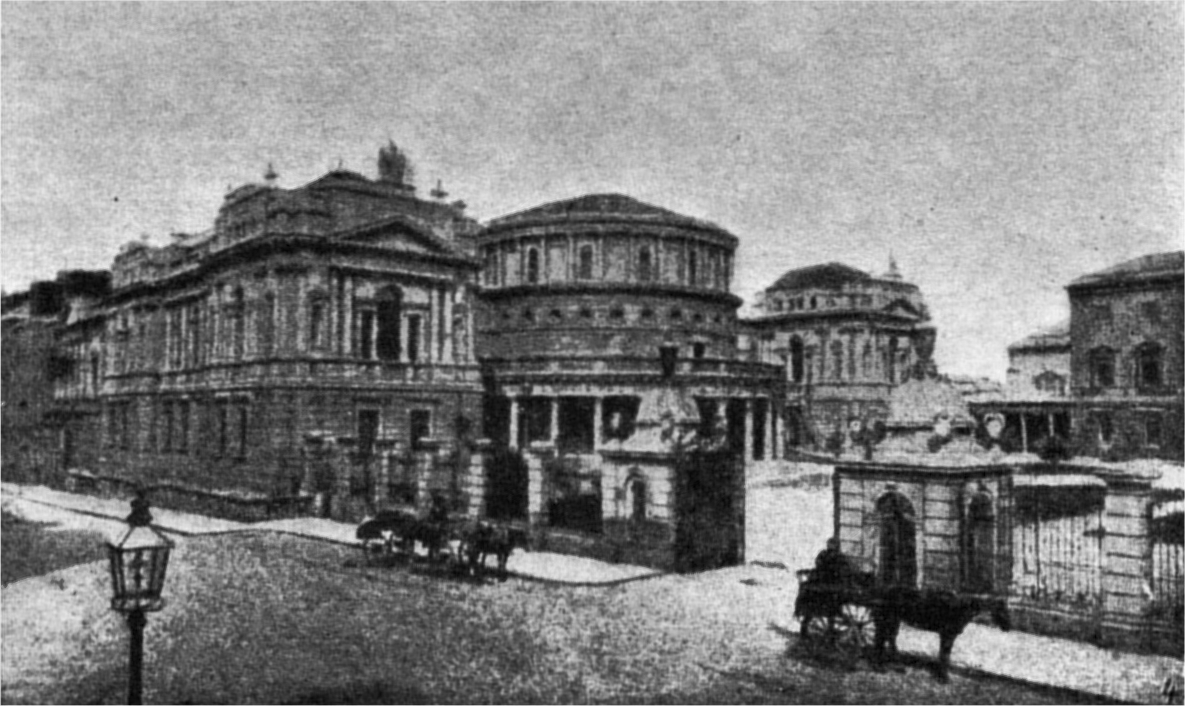
1907 photograph of the National Library of Ireland, as taken from the Nordisk familjebok

=== Personal archives and papers ===
The National Library of Ireland houses collections of archival papers, including personal notes and work books, of eminent writers including:

- Roddy Doyle
- Seamus Heaney
- Michael D. Higgins
- James Joyce
- Edna O'Brien
- Colm Tóibín
- Una Troy
- Sheila Wingfield
- W. B. Yeats

The National Library of Ireland houses the Sheehy Skeffington Papers, a collection of articles, books, poems, and other materials of Irish writers and activists, Francis Sheehy Skeffington, and Hanna Sheehy Skeffington. These writings offer an understanding into the influence of the Francis and Hanna Skeffington in early 20th Century Irish culture and thought as well as insight into their family life.

The library also holds the Cooper Collection. Austin Cooper (1759–1831) was a County Tipperary clerk who produced numerous sketches of Irish antiquities which were preserved by his great-grandson. The Cooper Collection also contains drawings by other artists including Francis Wheatley.

=== Parish registers ===
The Library also maintains an online index of all Catholic parish registers up to the 1880s which recorded baptisms, marriages and some burials. The original collection was preserved on microfilm and later was provided online.

=== Music ===
In 2010, the National Library of Ireland began a collaborative effort in a new website, the National Archive of Irish Composers, which was designed to develop a free online comprehensive collection of the sheet music of 18th and 19th century Irish composers. As of 2021, the website of the National Archive of Irish Composers describes the project as a collaborative venture between the National Library of Ireland, TU Dublin Conservatory of Music and Drama, Heritage Music Productions, directed by Dr Una Hunt.

=== Digital ===
In 2019, the Library accessioned its first "born digital" collection as a pilot scheme, receiving the digital collection of Irish author, Marian Keyes.

== See also ==
- List of Ireland-related topics
- List of libraries in the Republic of Ireland
- Thomas William Lyster, director of the library between 1895 and 1920.
- National Archives of Ireland
- National Photographic Archive
- Trinity College Library, Dublin
- UCD Library
