= Arthur Cox =

Arthur Cox may refer to:

- Arthur Cox (actor) (1934–2021), British actor
- Arthur Cox (American football) (1961–2020), former American football tight end
- Arthur Cox (English cricketer) (1907–1986), English cricketer
- Arthur Cox (footballer) (born 1939), English footballer and football manager
- Arthur Cox (lawyer) (1891–1965), Irish lawyer and politician
  - Arthur Cox (law firm), established by the Irish lawyer
- Arthur Cox (New Zealand cricketer) (1904–1977), New Zealand cricketer
- Arthur Cox (ornithologist) (1870–1947), English ornithologist
- Arthur Button (cricketer) (1815–1870), cricketer who later changed his name to Cox

== See also ==
- Arthur Cleveland Coxe (1818–1896), second Episcopalian bishop of New York
- Arthur Cocks (disambiguation)
- 3961 Arthurcox, minor planet
