= Special Branch =

Police intelligence units

Special Branch is a label customarily used to identify units responsible for matters of national security and intelligence in British, Commonwealth, Irish, and other police forces. A Special Branch unit acquires and develops intelligence, usually of a political or sensitive nature, and conducts investigations to protect the State from perceived threats of subversion, particularly terrorism and other extremist political activity.

The first Special Branch, or Special Irish Branch, as it was then known, was a unit of London's Metropolitan Police formed in March 1883 to combat the Irish Republican Brotherhood. The name became Special Branch as the unit's remit widened to include more than just Irish Republican-related counterespionage.

== Australia ==
Most state police forces and the federal police had a Special Branch. They were tasked mainly with monitoring the Communist Party of Australia and related political groups regarded as extremist or subversive. They also focused on German and Japanese activity during World War II.

- The Commonwealth Police Force was formed in 1917 as "a form of federal special branch" under the War Precautions Act 1914. It was disbanded in 1919.
- The Commonwealth Police Special Branch was established in 1957. It was absorbed into the Australian Federal Police in 1979.
- The Australian Federal Police Special Branch was renamed the Special Intelligence Branch in 1985 and merged into the Security Intelligence & Diplomatic Liaison Branch in 1995.
- The New South Wales Police Force Subversive Organisations Branch was formed in 1933. It was combined with the Commonwealth Police, Royal Australian Navy Police and Australian Army Police at the outbreak of World War II to form the Military/Police Intelligence Branch. The civilian component was formed back into the Police Subversive Organisations Branch in 1946, which was renamed Special Branch in 1948. The Royal Commission into the New South Wales Police Service found Special Branch was gathering information on people who posed no threat of politically motivated violence, and as a result it was disbanded in 1997.
- The Queensland Police Special Bureau was formed on 30 July 1940 and renamed Special Branch on 7 April 1948. It has been criticised for being used for political purposes by the Bjelke-Petersen government in the 1970s and 1980s, such as enforcing laws against protests (sometimes outnumbering the protesters or using provocateurs to incite violence so the protesters could be arrested) and investigating and harassing political opponents. It was disbanded in 1989 following a recommendation by the Fitzgerald Inquiry into police corruption. The Special Branch destroyed its records before Fitzgerald could subpoena them.
- South Australia Police formed an Intelligence Branch at the outbreak of World War II in 1939, which was disbanded in 1945. A Subversive Section was established in 1947 and renamed Special Branch in 1949. It amassed files on Australian Labor Party politicians, church leaders, trade unionists and so-called "pink files" on gay community activists at a time when homosexuality was still illegal. The South Australia Police was deliberately vague about the existence of Special Branch. In 1970, Commissioner Harold Salisbury told Premier Don Dunstan that Special Branch did not exist. A 1977 inquiry by Justice White of the Supreme Court of South Australia confirmed the existence and found the files were "scandalously inaccurate, irrelevant to security purposes and outrageously unfair to hundreds, perhaps thousands, of loyal and worthy citizens". Dunstan sacked Salisbury for misleading Parliament about the existence of the "pink files". Special Branch was disbanded in 1984.
- The Victoria Police Special Branch was formed in 1931 and disbanded in 1983. Similar work in monitoring terrorism is conducted by the Security Intelligence Group, established in 2000.

== Bahamas ==
Crest of the Royal Bahamas Police Force

The Security and Intelligence Branch, also known as Special Branch, is a domestic intelligence and security service in the Commonwealth of the Bahamas. It is mandated to perform intelligence operations inside the Bahamas to ensure the safety of Bahamian citizens and foreigners. The branch is also mandated to perform background checks on persons who have been recruited for jobs such as police officers and defence force officers and to check persons up for promotions. The Director of the Security Intelligence Branch holds the rank of Chief Superintendent.

== Bangladesh ==
The Bangladeshi Special Branch is an intelligence agency of Bangladesh Police. The Special Branch has twelve different sections through which it carries out the directives of the Government and around 64 district based offices, called District Special Branch and also has offices in many Upazila/Thana areas. All the members are recruited from the Bangladesh Police. The chief of the Special Branch has the rank of Additional Inspector General (Addl IGP) and reports directly to the Prime Minister of Bangladesh.

== Belize ==
It is responsible for the internal affairs of the country and collecting intelligence on behalf of the security services.

== Brunei ==
The ISD was created to replace the Royal Brunei Police's Special Branch division, which was disbanded on August 1, 1993.

== Canada ==
The RCMP Security Service was a counterintelligence unit or "Special Branch" from 1950 to 1984. It was replaced by the Canadian Security Intelligence Service.

== Fiji ==
The Special Branch unit of the Fiji Police Force is classed as one of the best intelligence units in the Asia Pacific region. Similar to their Commonwealth counterparts, the Fijian Special Branch deals with matters of national security. They facilitate Interpol, counter terrorism, surveillance, anti-espionage and VIP protection units. Entry into Special Branch is usually by recruitment. Even though it is a police unit, Special Branch also recruits from the Republic of Fiji Military Forces.

The unit's name was changed to the Fiji Police Intelligence Bureau in 2009. According to the Fijian government, this was done due to the "impact of modern crimes with other unlawful and illegal activities in national development demands dramatic changes in the Force." This was also done while the police force was being modernised.

== Hong Kong ==
In the face of a perceived direct Communist threat to Hong Kong, an Anti-Communist Squad was established in the Criminal Investigation Department of the then Hong Kong Police by 1930. It was named the Political Department in Chinese (政治部). In 1933, the squad's English name became "Special Branch" while its Chinese name remained unchanged. In addition to anti-subversion operations, its role during its first two decades also included immigration, passport control and registration of persons.

The division was disbanded in 1995, prior to the transfer of sovereignty over Hong Kong in 1997. Units of SB were reassigned under the Security Wing (Department B) – Crime and Security.

== India ==
The Special Branch is a separate wing in the state police agencies in India. Like their counterparts in the United Kingdom, they deal with matters of state security. However, more serious espionage detection is the responsibility of the Intelligence Bureau (IB), India's federal internal security agency. The nomenclature varies from state to state, such as State Special Branch (SSB), Special Branch CID (SB-CID), State Intelligence Department (SID), etc.

The Special Branch functions at the state level and is headed by a senior-ranked officer, the Additional Director General of Police (ADGP). The State Special Branch is responsible for collecting, assessing, and collating significant intelligence and communicating it to the government through periodic and special reports. The special branch functions as an intelligence agency and as the eyes and ears of the respective state governments. The special branch consists of several units such as Intelligence, Security, Internal Security, and sub-units like the extremist cell, digital surveillance unit, organized crime cell, VVIP security, bomb detection disposal squad, foreigners cell, passport verification, etc."

There have been many allegations that the Special Branch is used by the ruling government for setting up surveillance on their political opponents. The Special Branch has its own Detective Constables, Head Constables, Inspector rankings and superior police officer rankings. Every police station is to have a Special Branch head constable or Assistant Sub-Inspector (ASI) (working plain clothes or Mufti), he would be observing the society in general, and also taking reports from the uniformed police constables on general patrol. The special branch staff play a very important role in collecting advance intelligence about law and order matters as well as illegal activities like cannabis plantation/transportation, illicit attacks, etc. They forward the information to the respective Superintendents of police for necessary action.

== Ireland ==
In Ireland, the 'Special Branch' is known officially as the Special Detective Unit (SDU). The counter-terrorist and counterintelligence unit operates under the auspices of the Crime & Security Branch (CSB) of the Garda Síochána (Irish National Police). The SDU is responsible for the investigation of threats to state security and the monitoring of persons and groups who pose a threat on both national and international fronts. The SDU works closely with other special units within the Garda Síochána, such as the National Surveillance Unit (NSU) and Emergency Response Unit (ERU), and Ireland's national and military intelligence agency – the Defence Forces Directorate of Military Intelligence. The Special Detective Unit has a close working relationship with similar units in other western countries, particularly the United Kingdom, who share information to target, detect and disrupt the activities of terrorists.

== Malaysia ==
The Malaysian Special Branch is an intelligence agency attached to the Royal Malaysian Police (RMP). The SB is empowered to acquire and develop intelligence on internal and external threats to the nation, subversive activities, extremist activities and activities of sabotage and spying. It is also empowered to analyse and advise on the necessary course of action to the various departments and agencies both within the Police Department and other related agencies.

== Myanmar ==
The Special Branch under the control of the Myanmar Police Force is also known as the Special Intelligence Department.

== New Zealand ==
The New Zealand Police Special Branch was formally created on 29 December 1949. At the time, the-then Police Commissioner Jim Cummings decided that the section of the Police Force dealing with subversive organisations would be designated the Special Branch, following a recent precedent established by a conference of Police Commissioners in Melbourne in November 1949. Its functions included dealing with subversive organisations and vetting public servants. Known targets of the Special Branch included the Communist Party of New Zealand, the Waterside Workers' Union, and the left-wing New Zealand diplomat and alleged KGB spy Desmond Patrick Costello and the civil servant and intellectual Bill Sutch. In November 1956, the Special Branch's functions were transferred to the New Zealand Security Service, which was later renamed the New Zealand Security Intelligence Service.

== Pakistan ==
The Special Branch is an intelligence unit of the Police Service of Pakistan.

== Papua New Guinea ==
Special Branch sections of the New Guinea Police Force and Royal Papuan Constabulary, in Australia-controlled Territory of Papua and Territory of New Guinea, were established in 1947. These were merged into the Royal Papua New Guinea Constabulary in 1950.

== Rhodesia ==
The British South Africa Police (BSAP) developed its Special Branch in the early 1950s amid growing political unrest in the Federation of Rhodesia and Nyasaland. It remained active following the dissolution of the federation and was instrumental in creating the Selous Scouts during the Rhodesian Bush War. Following formal recognition of Zimbabwean independence in 1980, the Special Branch was succeeded in part by the Central Intelligence Organisation and later, the Police Internal Security and Intelligence division (PISI).

== Singapore ==
The Internal Security Department of Singapore was initially established as the Criminal Intelligence Department in 1918 after the Sepoy Mutiny of 1915. In 1933, the CID was renamed as Special Branch.

In 1939, it was restructured into the Malayan Security Service (MSS) which was not yet fully operational by the time of the outbreak of the Second World War. The MSS was disrupted by the Japanese invasion and subsequent occupation of Singapore and Malaya. It was disbanded in 1948 and two secret branches, one in Singapore and the other in Malaysia, were created.

The Singapore Special Branch (SSB) was first established on 23 August 1948 by the British colonial government, after the Communist Party of Malaya (CPM) launched an armed uprising to establish a communist state. It was structured under the Singapore Police Force and headed by a Deputy Commissioner.

After Singapore achieved independence, the SSB was renamed as the Internal Security Department and became a separate agency on 17 February 1966, together with its foreign counterpart, the Security and Intelligence Division (SID). Both agencies operated under the former Ministry of Interior and Defence until 11 August 1970, when the ministry was split into the Ministry of Defence (MINDEF) and MHA with SID and ISD falling under them respectively.

== South Africa ==
During Apartheid, the South African Police's Security Branch, also known as the Special Branch was a police unit often used to attack anti-Apartheid groups using techniques and tactics including such as conducting surveillance, infiltrating meetings, recruiting informers, and obtaining documents and leaflets. They have also been linked to torture, extralegal detention, and forced disappearances and assassinations against anti-Apartheid activists in the ANC and SACP. They first gained this role in the 1960s, under the regime of Justice Minister "B.J." Vorster, who convened the Special Branch to target these groups. Controversially, they have also been linked to the bombing of anti-apartheid groups COSATU and SACC during the South African Truth & Reconciliation Committees. It is now the Crime Intelligence Unit which investigates crime but which continues to investigate groups perceived to be enemies of the state such as social movements.

== Sri Lanka ==
The Special Branch of Ceylon (now Sri Lanka) was created in late 1966 tasked with national security as an intelligence agency attached to Ceylon Police Force. This was closed down in 1970.

== United Kingdom ==
The first Special Branch in the world was that of the Metropolitan Police, formed in London in 1883, with each British police force going on to form its own Special Branch. In Northern Ireland, the Royal Ulster Constabulary (1922–2001) had the RUC Special Branch. Many of those in county and city police forces have since been merged or converted into inter-force regional counter terrorism units and organised crime units.

== See also ==
- Forward intelligence team
- Special Investigation Branch (military police, the equivalent of the CID)
