= Garda National Surveillance Unit =

Police intelligence unit in Ireland

- Irish: Aonad Faireacháin Náisiúinta

Agency overview
- Formed: 1995; 31 years ago
- Preceding agency: Garda Special Surveillance Unit (SSU) "Tango Squad"
- Jurisdiction: Ireland
- Headquarters: Phoenix Park, Dublin (D8); Harcourt Street, Dublin (D2)
- Employees: Undisclosed (estimated 100)
- Annual budget: Undisclosed (part of Garda Síochána budget, €1.34 billion in 2014)
- Minister responsible: Jim O'Callaghan, TD, Minister for Justice, Home Affairs and Migration
- Agency executives: Justin Kelly, Garda Commissioner; John O'Mahoney, Assistant Commissioner of Crime and Security
- Parent agency: Crime & Security Branch; Garda Síochána

The National Surveillance Unit (NSU) (Irish: Aonad Faireacháin Náisiúinta) is the principal clandestine intelligence gathering and surveillance operations unit of the Garda Síochána, the national police force of Ireland. The unit operates under the Crime & Security Branch (CSB), based at Garda Headquarters in the Phoenix Park, Dublin, and also works from Harcourt Street, Dublin. Members of the unit are specially trained and selected Detective Gardaí who are tasked to remain covert whilst on and off duty, tracking suspected criminals, terrorists and hostile, foreign spies operating in Ireland. The unit's detectives are routinely armed. The National Surveillance Unit is understood to possess a manpower of approximately 100 officers, and is considered to be the most secretive arm of the force.

== Structure ==
The Garda National Surveillance Unit was formed in the mid-1990s, when the "Crime Special Surveillance Unit" and the "Crime Ordinary Surveillance Unit" were merged. It is the operational wing of the Security & Intelligence Section (S&I) of the Crime & Security Branch (CSB). The unit is headed by a Detective Chief Superintendent, who is under the supervision of the Assistant Commissioner in charge of the Crime and Security Branch. It is understood to have a strength of about 100 plainclothes officers, mainly detectives, who all carry firearms (standard issue is the concealable Walther P99c 9mm semi-automatic pistol). The unit is headquartered in the Phoenix Park, but carries out many operations from Harcourt Street. The NSU has personnel nationwide, and works closely with the Special Detective Unit (SDU) as well as Garda analysts or "techies" in other Garda regions, although often local Gardaí are unaware of the presence of the NSU operating in their area.

Increasingly, the NSU is using technical and electronic espionage rather than physical and human intelligence, working with the SDU and Irish Military Intelligence Service (IMIS), mainly to counter terror, militant and subversive groups in Ireland, as well as serious crime (particularly drug trafficking) and the activities of hostile foreign governments on Irish soil (counterintelligence).

The Garda NSU is considered the most covert unit of the force, and according to the Department of Justice: "It is the policy of An Garda Síochána not to comment on any matters relating to the operation of the National Surveillance Unit."

=== "Ghost Teams" ===
The Garda NSU operates a small number of "Ghost Teams" or "Ghost Units", which conduct "Black bag operations", whereby a team of officers will break into a property upon possession of a warrant and plant bugs to gather intelligence or evidence against suspected serious criminals, terrorists or hostile spies without their knowledge, and without leaving a trace (hence the name "Ghost Team"). The existence of these teams came to public attention following the publishing of The Criminal Justice (Surveillance) Act 2009. The equipment and technology used by the NSU is highly sophisticated and very expensive, but is also kept secret.

== Activities ==
The National Surveillance Unit has been involved in a number of high-profile Garda operations, though rarely are the unit named, and they do not appear in public.

- In August 1998, the Real IRA terrorist organisation detonated a car bomb in Omagh, Northern Ireland (see Omagh bombing), killing 29 people and injuring 220 others. It was the single deadliest terrorist attack ever carried out on the island of Ireland, and all the casualties were innocent members of the public. In the aftermath, claims were made by whistleblowers that the Garda National Surveillance Unit had obtained intelligence three weeks prior to the bombing that a stolen car would be used by the Real IRA in an attack on a town in Northern Ireland, and failed to pass this information on to the Royal Ulster Constabulary (RUC), in order to protect the identity of an informant. These claims have been strenuously denied by both the Garda Síochána and Irish government, although subsequent investigations suggest that had the Gardaí and RUC pooled their resources, the attack may have been prevented. The infiltration of dissident republicans by the Gardaí, RUC, MI5 and Federal Bureau of Investigation (FBI) led to five foiled terrorist attacks in the same year, including a thwarted "spectacular" bombing of the Aintree Grand National.
- In December 2001, NSU Detective Sergeant John Eiffe – aged 40 from Ratoath, County Meath – was killed by a bullet ricochet from a colleague in the Emergency Response Unit (ERU) during an operation to arrest four armed bank robbers in Abbeyleix, County Laois. The four men had been under surveillance by NSU detectives, and when they attempted to rob a bank, the NSU and Emergency Response Unit intervened. One of the men attempted to flee using his vehicle, and the sound of a tyre bursting led officers at the scene to believe they were being fired on by the armed robbers, causing them to open fire. It later transpired that although the criminals had been carrying firearms, they had not discharged them. Gardaí discharged all 3 shots. Another officer was also injured in the incident, but recovered.
- In May 2009, NSU detectives shot and killed an armed raider in Lucan, County Dublin after he attempted to hold-up a cash-in-transit van. 27-year-old Gareth Molloy, who had previous criminal convictions, and his gang were under surveillance by the NSU for a number of weeks prior to the incident. Gardaí received intelligence that the gang were going to carry out a heist, and the NSU were backed-up by the National Bureau of Criminal Investigation (NBCI), Organised Crime Unit (OCU) and ERU. When Molloy and a gang associate attempted to hold-up a cash delivery van at gunpoint and fired a shot in the air, NSU detectives intervened and ordered the armed raiders to drop their weapons. Gareth Molloy pointed a sawn-off shotgun in the direction of armed Gardaí and was immediately fired upon by NSU officers and was fatally wounded. His associate refused to drop his weapon, and was also shot, but survived with serious injuries. 5 shots were fired by Gardaí in total. No one else was hurt. Four other gang members were arrested, charged and jailed following a pursuit in the aftermath of the incident.
- In March 2013, NSU detectives were carrying out physical surveillance on dissident republicans when a former leader of the Real IRA terrorist group, Peter Butterly, aged 35, was assassinated by his own gang outside of a public house in Gormanston, County Meath, unaware of the presence of onlooking intelligence officers. Five men were arrested at or close to the scene at gunpoint by the NSU, backed-up by the SDU and ERU, and three were charged with his murder, as well as terrorism offences. It was reported that the Gardaí had an undercover officer planted in the gang, who was being backed-up by armed officers nearby, and that he had to break his cover in the aftermath of the shooting to apprehend members of the gang. An NSU team had planted a tracking device, following secret judicial approval, on the car in which their undercover officer was travelling in. Armed Gardaí were forced to ram one vehicle to stop it fleeing the scene. No one else was injured in the incident.

== Killed in the line of duty ==
Rank	Name	Year of death	Circumstances
Detective Sergeant	John Eiffe	2001	Fatally wounded in friendly fire incident during arrest operation, County Laois

== See also ==
- Garda Crime & Security Branch (CSB)
- Garda Special Detective Unit (SDU)
- Garda Emergency Response Unit (ERU)
- Garda Counter-Terrorism International (CTI)
- Irish Military Intelligence Service (IMIS)
- National Cyber Security Centre (NCSC)
