= Witness Protection of South Africa =

To protect threatened witnesses before, during, and after a trial

- Coat of arms of South Africa
- Administered by: Department of Justice and Constitutional Development
- Codified under: Witness Protection Act 112 of 1998
- Year established: 1998
- Aim: to protect witnesses and their families
- Annual budget: 3 million USD
- Location: Cape Town

The Witness Protection Program of South Africa, also known as the Witness Protection Scheme, is a South African witness protection program codified under the Witness Protection Act 112 of 1998 and administered by the South African Department of Justice. The primary objectives of the programme are to protect witnesses and their families from harm, ensure the safety and security of witnesses during and after trials, prevent witness intimidation and tampering, and support the criminal justice system by ensuring witness cooperation.

== History ==
The program was established in response to the high number of witness intimidation and killings during the apartheid era, which led to a breakdown in the criminal justice system. The program was created to ensure that witnesses feel safe and protected, thereby enabling them to testify without fear of reprisal. The program protects witnesses, their families, and other individuals who are at risk due to their involvement in criminal cases, including witnesses to crimes, victims of crime, family members of witnesses and victims, experts, and informants.

The program is administered by the South African Police Service in partnership with other government agencies, including the Department of Justice and Constitutional Development, National Prosecuting Authority, and Department of Social Development. The program provides a range of services, including assessment of witness risk, protection planning, relocation and accommodation, identity protection, and counseling and support.

== See also ==
- Witness immunity
- Witness Security Programme (Ireland)
- Witness tampering
