= Arthur Cocks =

Arthur Cocks may refer to:

- Arthur Cocks (cricketer) (1904–1944), English cricketer and the first British Army officer killed on D-Day
- Arthur Cocks (politician) (1862–1943), Australian politician
- Arthur Cocks, 6th Baron Somers, Worcestershire cricketer
- Arthur Cocks, 7th Baron Somers, see Royal Warrant of Precedence

== See also ==
- Arthur Somers-Cocks (1870–1923), English-born West Indian cricketer
- Arthur Cox (disambiguation)
- Arthur Coxe, bishop
