= Garda Counter-Terrorism International =

The Garda Counter-Terrorism International (CTI) unit is attached to the Special Detective Unit (SDU) of the Garda Síochána, the national police service of Ireland. The Special Detective Unit and its subsections operate under the command of the Crime and Security Branch (CSB). The unit comes under the brief of the Assistant Commissioner for Crime & Security, and reports directly to the Garda Commissioner.

The purpose of the Garda Counter-Terrorism International section is to identify and monitor international terrorism suspects and groups within the jurisdiction of Ireland, specifically those with links to or motivated by Islamic jihadism, who pose a threat to Ireland and to other countries.

== Manpower ==
The Garda CTI is reported to have around 20-30 specialist Gardaí, operating over five rotating shifts. Detectives and officers in the CTI work in plainclothes and carry concealed firearms.

The CTI operates its own specialist surveillance unit and officers work closely with western international security and intelligence services. CTI keeps known targets under surveillance and identifies people who come in contact with their targets, often by conducting what is known as a "cold stop" whereby officers stop suspects and those accompanying them in a public place, sometimes stopping their vehicles, taking their details and questioning them under anti-terrorist legislation. Tracking these suspects relies heavily on the application of technical surveillance, such as audio/visual devices and telephone tapping.

The Counter-Terrorism International unit also manage their own informants via the Covert Human Intelligence Sources (CHIS) system, administered by Garda HQ.

== Responsibilities ==
Operational matters within the Garda CTI, and wider SDU and CSB are exempt from the remit of the Garda Síochána Ombudsman Commission, Ireland's policing watchdog.

== Known operations ==
Detectives from the Garda CTI assisted with the investigation into the 2015 Sousse terrorist attacks in Tunisia where 3 Irish citizens were killed.

It has also sent members to Greece alongside officials from the Department of Justice to assist in the vetting process for refugees seeking status in Ireland.

== See also ==
- Garda Crime & Security Branch (CSB)
- Garda Special Detective Unit (SDU)
- Garda Emergency Response Unit (ERU)
- Garda National Surveillance Unit (NSU)
- Defence Forces Directorate of Military Intelligence (G2)
