= Special Detective Unit =

Unit of the Irish national police

Garda Special Detective Unit
- Irish: Aonad Speisialta Bleachtaireachta

Agency overview
- Formed: 11 July 1921; 105 years ago as the Criminal Investigation Department (CID)
- Preceding agency: Garda Special Branch
- Jurisdiction: Ireland
- Headquarters: Military Road,Kilmainham, Dublin (D8) 53°20′03.5″N 6°15′50.3″W
- Employees: Undisclosed; ~ 300
- Annual budget: Undisclosed (part of Garda Síochána budget, €1.34 billion in 2014)
- Minister responsible: Minister for Justice, Home Affairs and Migration
- Agency executives: Justin Kelly, Garda Commissioner; John O'Mahoney, Assistant Commissioner of Crime and Security
- Parent agency: Crime & Security Branch; Garda Síochána
- Website: Official website

The Special Detective Unit (SDU) (Irish: Aonad Speisialta Bleachtaireachta) is the main domestic security agency of the Garda Síochána, the national police force of Ireland, under the aegis of the Crime and Security Branch (CSB). It is the primary counter-terrorism and counter-espionage investigative unit within the state. The Special Detective Unit superseded the Special Branch (which they are still commonly referred to as), which itself replaced the older Criminal Investigation Department (CID), which was founded in 1921. They work in conjunction with the Irish Military Intelligence Service (IMIS) – Ireland's national intelligence service – on internal matters. The unit's headquarters are on Military Road, Kilmainham, Dublin 8.

The Emergency Response Unit (ERU), a specialist armed tactical unit, was a division of the SDU until 2017 when the Special Tactics and Operational Command took over command of the unit.

== History ==
The Civic Guard was formed by the Provisional Government in February 1922 to take over the responsibility of policing the fledgling Irish Free State, which came into being on 6 December 1922. The Garda Síochána (Temporary Provisions) Act 1923 enacted on 8 August 1923, provided for the creation of "a force of police to be called and known as 'The Garda Síochána'".

Separate from the Gardaí, a Protection Officers Corps was set up to provide bodyguards for prominent treatyites during the Civil War. There was also a more secretive body called the Citizens Defence Force, responsible directly to Kevin O’Higgins and funded through the offices of Arthur Cox. In charge of it was Captain Henry Harrison, an Irish politician and nationalist. The exact function of this force remains unclear but some believe responsible for the unsolved disappearance of a number of prominent republicans at that time. The remains of one of them, Noel Lemass, were discovered by accident years afterwards, secretly buried in the Dublin Mountains.

Oriel House was taken over and became a much-feared interrogation centre. The team, about 80-strong, was accused of using brutal interrogation techniques and of the assassination of republican suspects and prisoners. A study of the period concluded,

"Oriel House succeeded in its task of suppressing small scale republican activities in the Dublin area, not by the sophistication and efficiency its intelligence work... but by the more direct method of striking terror into its opponents."

They were disbanded after the Civil War: supposedly because of squeamishness on the part of Kevin O’Higgins; but a core was retained as G-division of the Dublin Metropolitan Police: the G-men, headed by ex-RIC Inspector David Neligan.

In 1926, after the DMP had been amalgamated with the Gardaí, this unit was renamed the Special Branch in imitation of English nomenclature.

== Duties ==
The responsibilities of the Special Detective Unit include;

- The investigation of threats to state security and the monitoring of persons and organisations who pose a threat on both national and international fronts
- Counter-terrorism operations (specifically targeting dissident republicans and Islamic extremists)
- Counter-intelligence
- Armed response to serious incidents
- Security for movement of weapons, ammunition, and large cash-in-transit shipments
- Operation of the Witness Security Programme
- Presidential, ministerial and diplomatic protection, physical security for visiting VIPs

Gardaí use five levels to grade the international terror threat level for Ireland; low, moderate, substantial, severe and critical.

The grades are based on a series of factors, including information supplied by international authorities. The current level is considered to be moderate, meaning an attack is "possible, but not likely".

=== Bodyguards ===
SDU bodyguards accompany the president of Ireland on official visits in Ireland and internationally, and the Taoiseach is protected by a Close Protection detail from the SDU.

Full-time armed protection and transport is afforded to the Tánaiste, Minister for Justice, Home Affairs and Migration, Attorney General, Chief Justice, Director of Public Prosecutions and Garda Commissioner.

All government ministers and former Presidents and Taoisigh are provided with armed protection and transport when their security is deemed under threat, otherwise it is reserved for official state occasions.

Ambassadors and high-ranking foreign diplomats in Ireland are given protection by the SDU when their safety or security is "at risk". High-risk foreign diplomatic premises are also protected by the unit, such as the embassies and diplomatic residences of the United States, United Kingdom and Israel in Dublin.

== Organisational structure ==
The Special Detective Unit operates out of the Dublin Metropolitan Region (DMR) Headquarters of the Gardaí in Harcourt Street, Dublin, and has personnel in all six Garda regions (DMR, Eastern, Northern, Southern, South-Eastern and Western).

The unit has a number of secret buildings which it uses for covert operations. The SDU has a strength of between 200 and 300 plainclothes detectives, and a further 100 officers attached to the Emergency Response Unit.

The agency is headed by a Detective Chief Superintendent, who is under the command of the Assistant commissioner in charge of the Crime & Security Branch (CSB), who reports directly to the Garda Commissioner. The Garda Commissioner briefs the Minister for Justice, Taoiseach and the National Security Committee (NSC) on state security matters.

The SDU uses anti-terrorism legislation (chiefly the Offences against the State Acts) to conduct operations and uses the non-jury Special Criminal Court to prosecute terrorism offenders.

The SDU is a secretive organisation. When officers from the unit appear in court they routinely give evidence anonymously from behind a screen to protect their identity.

The budget for the SDU is classified, although it is drawn from the overall Garda budget (€1.34 billion in 2014). The only published figures are those for the budget to pay confidential informants, via the Covert Human Intelligence Sources (CHIS) system.

The fund used to pay informers is known as the "Secret Service" budget, and it is shared between the Crime & Security Branch and Irish Military Intelligence Service. In 2014, it was €1 million.

Although the service's jurisdiction is the Republic of Ireland, officers from the unit have been active in Northern Ireland, a region which is officially part of the United Kingdom.

In 2013, Ireland had the fourth highest number of arrests for terrorism-related offences in the entire European Union, with 41 individuals arrested, behind only France (225), Spain (90) and the United Kingdom (77), according to Europol.

The average prison sentence for a person convicted under terrorism legislation in Ireland was 12 years in 2013, the third highest in the EU, behind Greece (27 years) and Spain (14 years).

=== Counter-Terrorism International ===
The Garda Counter-Terrorism International (CTI) unit was established in 2014 as a dedicated section of the SDU to identify and monitor Islamic terrorism threats and share intelligence with international security and law enforcement agencies on this issue.

The Garda CTI has up to 50 full-time members who operate over 5 shifts. This section has its own surveillance teams and informants, and reports directly to the Garda Commissioner.

The Counter-Terrorism Domestic (CTD) section deals with homegrown terrorism.

=== Hostage Negotiation Section ===
The Garda Hostage Negotiation Section (HNS), officially formed in 2007, is a subdivision of the Garda SDU. It is headed by an experienced Detective Superintendent, who cannot be identified for operational reasons.

The senior HNS officer along with the Garda National Negotiator Co-Ordinator (NNC) are involved in the selection, training and coordination of the more than 70 specialist Garda negotiators stationed in all divisions in the country.

Officers under the command of this section are not necessarily Special Branch detectives.

Negotiators are educated at the Garda Síochána College, Metropolitan Police Service, Federal Bureau of Investigation (FBI) and the Central Mental Hospital (HSE National Forensic Mental Health Service).

=== Witness Security Programme ===
The Garda Witness Protection Unit is a small, dedicated and highly secretive subsection of the SDU, which operates the state's Witness Security Programme, at the direction of the Attorney General of Ireland.

The unit (established in 1997) is headed by a Detective Inspector, and further reinforcements can be drawn from the Special Branch when there is a need. The Garda ERU provide tactical assistance to the programme.

The budget for the unit was €1.198 million in 2014. Witnesses in the programme are given a new identity, address and armed police protection either in Ireland or abroad. There has never been a reported breach of security in which a protectee was harmed.

== Operations ==
The Special Detective Unit works closely with other specialist and national units within the Garda Síochána, namely the National Surveillance Unit (NSU) – a police intelligence gathering agency – and the heavily armed intervention teams of the Emergency Response Unit (ERU). The Special Detective Unit works with the National Economic Crime Bureau (GNECB) in relation to financial intelligence and terrorism financing. The Irish Military Intelligence Service – Ireland's national intelligence agency – shares intelligence, trains with and carries out joint operations with the unit. The SDU has historically operated in tandem with American, British and other European law enforcement agencies in combating terrorists and foreign government threats. They maintain a strong working relationship with the Police Service of Northern Ireland (PSNI), London Metropolitan Police Service (MPS, or 'the Met'), British Security Services (MI5) and the Federal Bureau of Investigation (FBI), among others, and share information with Europol and Interpol.

An MI5 unit based at the regional headquarters (Palace Barracks) in Holywood, County Down, in Northern Ireland works with both the PSNI and Gardaí to track the activities of domestic and foreign terrorist threats, and in 2008 this led to the discovery of a suspected al-Qaeda bomb-making factory in County Kerry, where three people were arrested, some of whom had previously been under surveillance by the Special Detective Unit's Middle Eastern Bureau and National Surveillance Unit.

SDU officers have conducted operations alongside Irish Military Intelligence, the United States' Central Intelligence Agency (CIA) and FBI in monitoring, arresting and prosecuting suspected al-Qaeda extremists using Ireland as a launchpad for terror attacks on Europe and the US. The agency was involved in foiling several radical Islamic militants in Cork suspected of plotting to assassinate Swedish cartoonist Lars Vilks in 2009, in response to an al-Qaeda in Iraq bounty after the Muhammad drawings controversy, working with British and American intelligence agencies.

In 2010, the Special Detective Unit, Garda Bureau of Fraud Investigation (GBFI) and Criminal Assets Bureau (CAB) broke up what was described by Europol as "one of the biggest and most sophisticated counterfeiting operations ever uncovered in Europe", which had the capacity to produce €200 million (£167 million/$276 million) in counterfeit banknotes annually, some of which were shipped as far away as Japan, in an attempt to fund IRA terrorist and criminal activities.

The Special Detective Unit was the principal security agency involved in protecting Britain's Queen Elizabeth II on her historic visit to Ireland in the summer of 2011, facing a significant threat from dissident republican paramilitary organizations, and they prevented a number of attempted bombings and assassination attempts to ensure a peaceful visit. The SDU also worked alongside the United States Secret Service (USSS) and Diplomatic Security Service (DSS) in a heightened security state during the visit of US President Barack Obama to Ireland in 2011, fearing retaliation from al-Qaeda terrorists in response to the death of Osama bin Laden a number of weeks earlier. It was Obama's first trip overseas following the killing of bin Laden by US Navy SEALs in Pakistan, and his visit was deemed a major success.

Following the outbreak of the Syrian Civil War (2011–2024) and the campaign of violence perpetrated by the "Islamic State" (2014) terrorist organisation in Iraq, the Middle Eastern Bureau of the Special Detective Unit and the Irish Military Intelligence Service increased their monitoring of Irish residents and citizens who travelled to conflict regions in the Middle East to partake in fighting, with the fear they may become radicalised and carry out Islamic jihadist terrorist attacks in Ireland, Europe and North America upon their return. The Middle Eastern Bureau and Military Intelligence is tasked with monitoring between 30 and 60 people living in Ireland who are under suspicion due to their links with Muslim extremist organisations. The Irish authorities have been working with the British security services, MI5 and the Secret Intelligence Service (SIS/MI6), to identify possible returning terrorists by sharing data, information and intelligence, operating a joint database and watchlist, and cross-checking airline passenger manifests to track Irish and UK residents and citizens who are travelling to and from conflict zones in the Middle East. The US National Security Agency (NSA) also shares intelligence with the Gardaí and Defence Forces security services with regards to the activities of fighters in Syria and Iraq who have originated from Ireland.

On 11 August 2024, SDU officers arrested a man who made death threats against Taoiseach Simon Harris and his family. On August 16, 2024, SDU detectives investigated a stabbing attempt at Renmore Barracks.

== Killed in the line of duty ==
A number of officers in the Garda Special Detective Unit have lost their lives in the course of serving the state since the early 1920s. Seven Special Branch detectives are known to have been unlawfully killed in the line of duty since 1940.

shaded rows denote when officers were killed in the same incident.

Rank	Name	Year of death	Circumstances
Detective Sergeant	Patrick McKeown	1940	Fatally wounded (shot) during raid on IRA safehouse, Dublin
Detective	Richard Hyland	1940	Fatally wounded (shot) during raid on IRA safehouse, Dublin
Detective Sergeant	Denis O'Brien	1942	Assassinated (shot) by IRA members in his car, County Dublin
Detective	George Mordaunt	1942	Murdered (shot) during raid on criminal gang, Dublin
Chief Superintendent	Seán Gantly	1948	Accidentally shot dead while pursuing an escaped prisoner, Dublin
Detective	Frank Hand	1984	Fatally wounded (shot) during IRA robbery of cash-in-transit van, County Meath
Detective	Jerry McCabe	1996	Fatally wounded (shot) during IRA robbery of a cash-in-transit van, County Limerick

== Weapons ==
All officers within the unit carry firearms, and train more often than regular police detectives.

All officers are armed with concealed semi-automatic pistols, and if the situation requires, they have access to shotguns, submachine guns, assault rifles and sniper rifles.

The SDU has a large pool of unmarked and armoured cars, and has access to helicopters if needed.

Weapon	Origin	Type
Taser X26	United States	Electroshock weapon
SIG Sauer P226	Germany	Semi-automatic pistol
Walther P99	Germany	Semi-automatic pistol
Heckler & Koch MP7	Germany	Submachine gun
Heckler & Koch HK416	Germany	Assault rifle
Heckler & Koch G36	Germany	Assault rifle
Heckler & Koch HK33	Germany	Assault rifle
Steyr SSG 04	Austria	Sniper rifle
Steyr SSG 69	Austria	Sniper rifle
Remington Model 870	United States	Shotgun
Benelli M3	Italy	Shotgun
Benelli M4	Italy	Shotgun

== Controversies ==
=== Electronic surveillance ===
It has been alleged that the Special Detective Unit has been involved in the telephone tapping and email hacking of crime journalists in Ireland, in attempts to reveal the identity of sources that appear in newspaper stories on crime and terrorism.

A number of journalists have accused the unit of monitoring their electronic communications, as well as carrying out covert surveillance on them when they are meeting sources in person.

Some journalists allege they have been questioned (and threatened with arrest) about sources used in crime and terrorism stories, including about Garda officers speaking to the media when not sanctioned to do so by senior management.

Warrantless wiretapping by the authorities in Ireland is not illegal but in the absence of a warrant resulting evidence cannot be used to bring prosecutions in court. The press say they have been asked not to publish certain stories which may jeopardise sensitive Garda operations, but that the force has not attempted to influence reporting.

In January 2012, Gardaí applied for 1,829 "requests for disclosure" from telecommunications and internet companies based in Ireland. There were 1,296 subscriber requests, 494 call trace requests and 39 IP (computer address) requests.

Taken as an average monthly total, theoretically, Gardaí would be seeking details of over 20,000 phone and broadband subscribers per annum. These requests have been the subject of an investigation by the Office of the Data Protection Commissioner.

== See also ==
- Garda National Surveillance Unit (NSU)
- Irish Military Intelligence Service (IMIS)
- National Cyber Security Centre (NCSC)
