= Garda Emergency Response Unit =

Unit of the Irish national police

Coordinates: 53°20′03.5″N 6°15′50.3″W

Emergency Response Unit
- Aonad Práinnfhreagartha (Irish)
- ERU emblem
- Active: 15 December 1977 – present
- Country: Ireland
- Agency: Garda Síochána
- Type: Police tactical unit
- Role: Counter-terrorism; Law enforcement; Hostage rescue
- Part of: Special Tactics and Operational Command
- Headquarters: Harcourt Street, Dublin City
- Abbreviation: ERU

Structure
- Officers: Approx. 100

Notables
- Significant operation(s): Shooting of John Carthy

The Emergency Response Unit (ERU) (Irish: Aonad Práinnfhreagartha) is the police tactical unit of the Garda Síochána, Ireland's national police and security service. The unit was a section of the forces' Special Detective Unit (SDU), under the Crime and Security Branch (CSB) until 2017, when the Special Tactics and Operational Command was created to take over its operational duties alongside Armed Support Units.

The Garda ERU provides the highest tier of firearms response to Irish law enforcement, specialising in weapons tactics, counter-terrorism, execution of high-risk missions, crisis negotiation, hostage rescue and close protection, among other roles. The unit was formed in 1977 as the "Special Task Force" to assist ordinary members of the force in extraordinary situations. The ERU regularly trains with the Irish Army Ranger Wing (ARW), the country's military special operations forces, sharing facilities and equipment.

== Roles ==
The Emergency Response Unit is responsible for handling the following operations in service of the Garda Síochána;

- Tactical armed responses to counter serious crime, subversion, insurgency and terrorism (including CBRNe)
- Execution of high-risk searches, warrants and arrests
- Hostage rescue, crisis negotiation, anti-hijacking operations, barricade incidents, active shooters, suicide bombers
- VIP close protection in Ireland and accompanying Irish government VIPs overseas
- Intelligence gathering, surveillance, counterintelligence and undercover operations
- Assistance to the Witness Security Programme
- Provide specialist patrols and response via land, air and sea
- Skills training and development

In addition to these roles, the Garda ERU has airborne capabilities (helicopters) provided by the Garda Air Support Unit (GASU) and Irish Air Corps when required, seaborne capabilities provided by the Garda Water Support Unit when needed, dog handlers (working with the Garda Dog Support Unit), sniper teams, paramedics, hostage negotiators (Garda Hostage Negotiation Section/HNS) and psychologists.

== History ==
The Special Task Force (STF) was formed on 15 December 1977 following an agreement on international terrorism at the European Council meeting in Brussels, Belgium in July 1976 on responding to terrorism. Garda officers had earlier conducted a study tour of the special units of the German Federal Police GSG 9 and Belgian Gendarmerie Speciaal Interventie Eskadron (SIE). The Special Task Force was based out of Harcourt Street, Dublin (where it is still headquartered today), under the umbrella of the Garda Special Branch (now Special Detective Unit). Many of the unit's first challenges were in combating the increasing threat of the Provisional IRA paramilitary group during The Troubles. On 17 March 1984, Special Task Force detectives captured Dominic McGlinchey, then considered leader of the Irish National Liberation Army (INLA), at a house in Newmarket-on-Fergus, County Clare following a gun battle in which an officer was seriously injured. In 1984, STF members underwent training with the Army Ranger Wing (ARW) forming the Anti-Terrorist Unit. The Anti-Terrorist Unit was renamed to the Emergency Response Unit (ERU) in 1987 to better reflect its role.

In the aftermath of the 2001 September 11 attacks in the United States, the ERU became a member of the ATLAS Network, a European Union (EU) organisation consisting of 32 special police units across Europe. More recently, the ERU has been deployed to trouble spots in Dublin City and Limerick City in a combined Garda effort to tackle gun violence, resulting in a 92% decline of firearms offences related to organised crime. Regular uniformed Gardaí (police officers) in Ireland are unarmed.

In 2017, operational command of the ERU was placed under the STOC to better reflect the Garda's mandate to provide firearms support and training under one command.

== Modus operandi ==
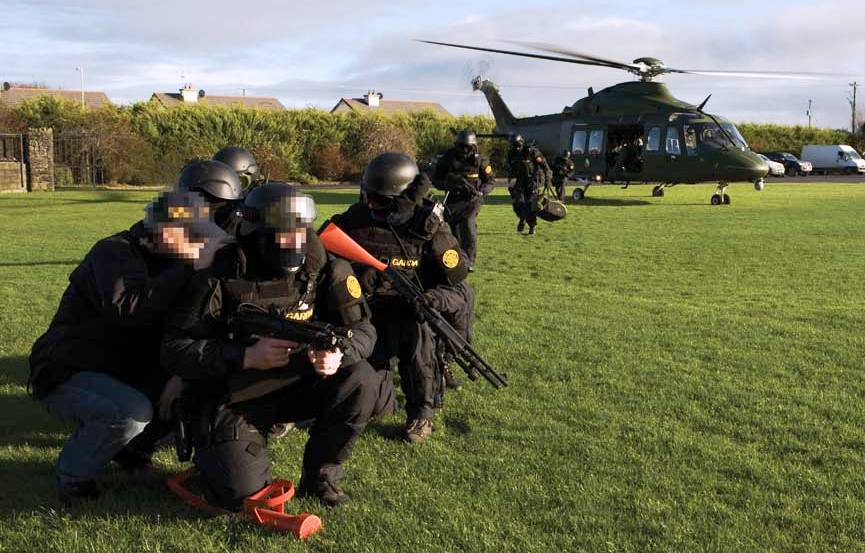
Garda Síochána Emergency Response Unit (ERU) tactical team disembarking from a helicopter

Membership of the Emergency Response Unit consists exclusively of serving officers in the Garda Síochána. It is understood to have more than 100 full-time officers on active duty. The head of the ERU is of Detective Chief Superintendent rank. By extension, ERU members are part of the Special Detective Unit, most are generally detectives but have few investigative duties. The identity of the unit's officers is highly sensitive, and when giving evidence in court, they are not named, appear behind a curtain and may have their voice altered. The ERU operates from a number of secret bases nationally.

The ERU includes a number of trained specialists, such as advanced drivers, marksmen, spotters, intelligence officers, communications technicians, close protection officers, weapons instructors, bomb disposal (explosives) experts, chemical, biological, radiological and nuclear experts, sky marshals, dog handlers and medics. All ERU operators are trained in handling semi-automatic pistols, shotguns, submachine guns, personal defense weapons, assault rifles, sniper rifles and less lethal weapons. Shifts are up to 12 hours, with a minimum of 8 hours break between shifts, and many officers work 6 days a week. Pay, apart from overtime and expenses incurred, is no different from uniformed Gardaí of the same rank.

A number of tactical teams are on duty at any one time, with usually at least one in training or carrying out exercises. ERU operators are distinguished by their black tactical uniforms with "GARDA" and "POLICE" emblazoned in yellow across their chest and back. However, approximately 80% of ERU operations are carried out in plainclothes.

=== Selection and training ===
Training is carried out at the Garda Tactical Training Unit, established in 1983 under the authority of the Garda Síochána College in Templemore, County Tipperary. The Army Ranger Wing "Tactical Town" or "Tac Town" in the Curragh Camp, County Kildare is also routinely used by the ERU, and operators receive further specialised training at the Federal Bureau of Investigation (FBI) National Academy in Quantico, Virginia in the United States. An officer's journey into the ranks of the ERU begins with a notorious two-week initiation dubbed "hell week", where candidates are both physically and mentally assessed. Examinations include tasks to be completed within a set amount of time both on land and in water. Failure during the recruitment process is extremely high (95%), but those who complete the tests successfully are then put through a number of more specific, rigorous exercises, where their suitability for the unit is determined. Aspiring ERU officers must have at least 4 years experience as a uniformed Garda with an unblemished disciplinary record before attempting to join the unit. The unit is admittedly male-dominated, but there are understood to be a number of women who have worked and work in the ERU.

ERU officers are required to qualify three times per year for all firearms being used by the unit, complete regular fitness tests and psychological examinations. ERU officers are also subject to stringent background checks by the Garda Central Vetting Unit (GCVU). Failure to pass these assessments may mean expulsion from operational duties. As part of their training, each member of the squad is made to sample the impact of their own non-lethal weapons, including being subdued by a Taser and must perform tasks after being hit with pepper spray in the eyes. All ERU operators are trained in advanced police driving, hand-to-hand combat (unarmed), close quarters combat (CQC) with and without the use of weaponry, climbing, abseiling and first aid.

Members of the ERU train regularly alongside Regional Support Units (RSU), the Army Ranger Wing and Explosive Ordnance Disposal (EOD) teams in Ireland, and abroad with; the Police Service of Northern Ireland (PSNI) Special Operations Branch (SOB) and Metropolitan Police Service (MPS) Specialist Firearms Command (SCO19) in the United Kingdom, and FBI Hostage Rescue Team (HRT) in the US, as well as similar organisations in France (RAID & GIGN), Germany (GSG 9), Netherlands and Finland. The unit also conducts large scale scenario-based exercises each year with multiple other Garda units. Following the 2011 Norway attacks, officers from Delta, the Norwegian Police Service tactical unit, came to Ireland to receive training from the Garda ERU, showing how highly the unit are regarded internationally.

=== Weapons and equipment ===
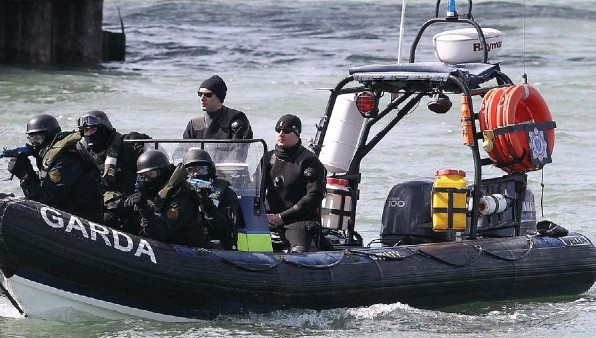
Garda Emergency Response Unit members conducting anti-terror maritime operations on the River Liffey, Dublin

The Garda ERU is a member of the ATLAS Network, who share best practice and establish protocol concerning tactics, weapons and equipment. While the ERU armoury includes dozens of firearms, the standard issue pistol is the self-loading 9mm SIG Sauer P226, which officers carry on and off duty. Tactical teams carry rifles, depending on the operation, the most common being the Heckler & Koch HK416 assault rifle and Heckler & Koch MP7 personal defense weapon. Tasers are also carried as standard by tactical teams. In addition to firearms, ERU operators carry routine police equipment such as a knife, ASP baton, pepper spray, flashlight and handcuffs. First aid kits, firefighting equipment and respirators are commonly carried. Protective clothing for tactical teams includes ballistic armour for the head, neck, torso and limbs (including bulletproof vest, combat helmet and ballistic eyewear), fire-retardant fabric and combat boots.

Other equipment used includes a ballistic shield, breaching apparatus (including explosives for dynamic entry), audiovisual equipment (including night vision equipment) and secure communications (TETRA encrypted devices). The ERU has a large pool of unmarked police vehicles, most of which are modified high-performance vehicles, including armoured vehicles, command and control vehicles and tactical assault vehicles. The ERU trains with other Garda units and the Air Corps in the utilisation of helicopters (AgustaWestland AW139 and Eurocopter EC135) and rigid-hulled inflatable boats (RIB), and has quick access to these when required.

=== Deployment procedure ===
In order for the Emergency Response Unit to be deployed in the Dublin Metropolitan Region (DMR), a request must be made by the Divisional Officer to either the Detective Chief Superintendent of the Special Detective Unit, or the Assistant Commissioner in charge of the Crime & Security Branch. For operations in the other five Garda regions (Eastern, Northern, Southern, South-Eastern and Western), the Divisional Officer would make the request to the appropriate Assistant Commissioner of that region. Outside of Dublin, the relevant Regional Support Unit (RSU) is usually deployed first, and may then request support from the ERU. The ERU aims to respond to any incident within the mainland of Ireland within 60 minutes of being dispatched, and within 2 hours outside of this (islands, watercraft, oil platforms, at sea, etc.), this may be achieved through the use of vehicles, watercraft or aircraft. The ERU may assume responsibility from the Irish Prison Service in the event they are not able to bring under control prison riots and may also be deployed to assist with escorting dangerous prisoners.

In the year of 2012, the ERU was called out to more than 200 firearms-related incidents, and carried out over 100 successful close protection operations.

Legislation passed in Ireland in the aftermath of the November 2015 Paris attacks allows the Garda Emergency Response Unit to respond to a terrorism crisis in another country in the European Union, and for Gardaí to request assistance from foreign specialist forces.

ERU patch worn by operators

== Notable incidents ==
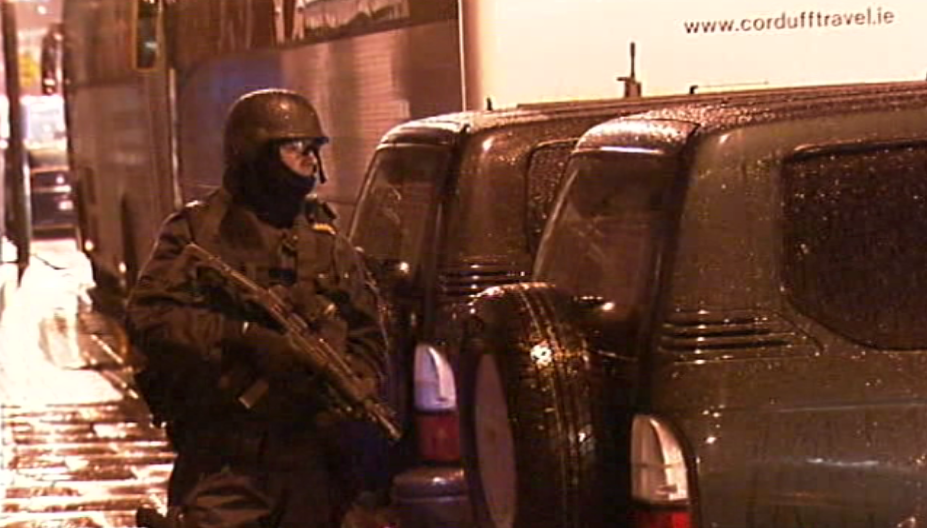
Garda ERU operator in Dublin following a shooting incident (shown holding Uzi, no longer in service)

Operations involving the Garda Emergency Response Unit have resulted in the deaths of ten people since 1990, including one (a Garda detective) accidentally. There have also been several incidents where lethal force was used but loss of life did not occur.

- In January 1990, one of five armed criminals was killed by a team from the Garda Emergency Response Unit, during a hostage-taking at a bank in Athy, County Kildare. Five raiders, each armed, from a prominent Dublin based criminal gang attempted to steal cash from the bank but had been followed by an undercover unit from the ERU, following a spate of violent robberies in the Greater Dublin Area. When the armed gang attempted to raid the bank, they were surrounded by ERU operatives, and resorted to taking staff, customers and passers-by hostage. An ERU marksman shot one gang member in the head from long range. Austin Higgins (26), who was on bail from robbery charges at the time, was fatally wounded. Eight people were injured during the incident, but all of the hostages were freed and survived. The remaining gang of four who were armed, but did not fire their weapons, were apprehended (two of whom were shot but survived) by Gardaí and later received 12-year prison sentences.
- In July 1990, two armed bank robbers were shot dead by officers from the Emergency Response Unit, after they held staff and customers at gunpoint at a bank branch in Leixlip, County Kildare. William Doyle (35) from Dublin and Thomas Wilson (39) from Northern Ireland made off with thousands of pounds in notes from the bank, and after the alarm was raised they were pursued in a high-speed chase by officers from the ERU. Gardaí forcibly ended the pursuit in Fairview, Dublin, and a shootout ensued, with the heavily armed ERU team fatally shooting both suspects without injury to any other party.
- In June 1997, a member of the Irish National Liberation Army (INLA) terrorist organisation was shot by armed detectives from the Emergency Response Unit following a failed attempt to raid a newsagent in Inchicore, Dublin at gunpoint to raise funds for terrorist activities. John Morris (26) refused to drop the pistol he was carrying (later found to be unloaded), was shot in the head and back, and died in hospital the next day. His two accomplices were also apprehended without injury to anyone else.
- In May 1998, armed Gardaí attached to the Emergency Response Unit shot dead a member of the Real IRA terrorist group, during an attempted robbery of a cash-in-transit van carrying £300,000 Irish pounds (€380,000 in Euro) in Ashford, County Wicklow. The gang of six had been under surveillance by a number of Garda units, including the National Surveillance Unit (NSU) and Special Detective Unit at the time. The armed raiders posed as county council workmen before blocking the road to stop the bank van. The gang was armed with an assault rifle, pump-action shotgun, revolver, imitation rocket launcher and an angle grinder. When the ERU moved in and foiled the robbery, 28-year-old Ronan McLoughlin was fatally shot by heavily armed ERU officers as he attempted to flee in a vehicle. 10 shots were fired by Gardaí, who had 25 firearms on the scene. Nobody else was shot. Five gang members were arrested and later found guilty of terrorism offences.
- In April 2000 (See: Death of John Carthy), the ERU was brought into the public spotlight after killing a 27-year-old man with a known mental disorder in controversial circumstances, following a 25-hour barricaded siege in Abbeylara, County Longford. John Carthy fired up to 7 shots from a legally held double-barreled shotgun, both at unarmed and armed Gardaí after a dispute with his family (he held no hostages). An ERU tactical team arrived from Dublin and took charge of the incident and attempted to negotiate with Carthy, but he repelled their attempts. After 25 hours, he exited his house through the front door with a loaded shotgun in his hands. He was repeatedly ordered at gunpoint to drop his weapon, but refused, and advanced towards the perimeter. Upon exiting his premises and walking towards the local town, he was shot four times by two ERU snipers (who fired two shots each) and died. No one else sustained injuries, although a police car was damaged by Carthy. The resulting Barr Tribunal was critical of the Gardaí, suggesting Carthy's life could have been preserved, however it found that the ERU team had acted within the law. The incident brought a number of changes in procedures when dealing with barricade incidents.
- In December 2001, Detective Sergeant John Eiffe – aged 40 from Ratoath, County Meath – of the National Surveillance Unit was killed by a bullet ricochet by a colleague from the Emergency Response Unit during an operation to arrest four armed bank robbers in Abbeyleix, County Laois. The four men had been under surveillance by NSU detectives, and when they attempted to rob a bank, the NSU and ERU intervened. One of the men attempted to flee using his vehicle, and the sound of a tyre bursting led officers at the scene to believe they were being fired on by the armed robbers, causing them to open fire. It later transpired that although the criminals had been carrying firearms, they had not discharge them. Gardaí discharged all 3 shots. Another officer was also injured in the incident, but recovered.
- In May 2005, ERU officers fatally shot two criminal raiders in Lusk, County Dublin during a pre-planned operation to foil an armed robbery of a post office. Colm Griffin (33) and Eric Hopkins (24) were both shot dead by a team of undercover detectives from the ERU, acting on intelligence that a four-man gang were going to raid the post office at gunpoint. Griffin was carrying a loaded pistol, which was not fired, and Hopkins a sledgehammer. Plainclothes officers, armed with concealed 9mm semi-automatic pistols, were lying in wait for the gang. When two gang members entered the post office and threatened staff and customers with weapons, the ERU officers pointed their guns at the pair and ordered them to drop their weapons. They did not, and both were fatally shot in the head at close range. Three shots were fired in total, all by Gardaí. Two other gang members were apprehended without incident. No one else sustained injuries. The operation was widely praised by the public and politicians, and saw a marked decrease in violent crime for a number of months in the aftermath. There was suspicion the raid was ordered as a fundraising attempt for dissident republicans.
- In May 2009, officers from the Emergency Response Unit were present when National Surveillance Unit detectives shot and killed an armed raider in Lucan, Dublin after he attempted to hold-up a cash-in-transit van. 27-year-old Gareth Molloy, who had previous criminal convictions, and his gang were under surveillance by the NSU for a number of weeks prior to the incident. Gardaí received intelligence that the gang were going to carry out a heist, and the NSU were backed up by the National Bureau of Criminal Investigation (NBCI), Organised Crime Unit (OCU) and ERU. When Molloy and a gang associate attempted to hold-up a cash delivery van at gunpoint and fired a shot in the air, NSU detectives intervened and ordered the armed raiders to drop their weapons. Gareth Molloy pointed a sawn-off shotgun in the direction of armed Gardaí and was immediately fired upon by NSU officers and was fatally wounded. His associate refused to drop his weapon, and was also shot, but survived with serious injuries. 5 shots were fired by Gardaí in total. No one else was hurt. Four other gang members were arrested, charged and jailed following a pursuit in the aftermath of the incident.
- In December 2017, a member of the ERU was shot as a tactical team breached a door with an angle grinder in an early morning raid at a property in Ballymun in Dublin, as part of an investigation into crack cocaine dealing. An 18-year-old man inside the property was then shot by ERU officers. Both men survived with "non-life-threatening" injuries. Three people were arrested inside the property.

== Killed in the line of duty ==
Rank	Name	Year of death	Circumstances
Detective ("Special Task Force")	Thomas J.A. Lawn	1983	Fatally injured in a traffic collision while on patrol duty as an observer, Dublin

== List of equipment ==
=== Firearms ===
Name	Origin	Type	Caliber	Photo	Notes
Pistols
SIG Sauer P226	Germany; Switzerland	Semi-automatic pistol	9×19mm Parabellum		DA/SA variant (DAO in use with all other Garda units)
Walther P99	Germany	Semi-automatic pistol	9×19mm Parabellum		P99c (Compact) concealable version also in use
Submachine guns
Heckler & Koch MP7A1	Germany	Personal defense weapon	HK 4.6×30mm		
Shotguns
Remington Model 870	United States	Pump action	12 gauge		
Benelli M4 Super 90	Italy	Semi-automatic shotgun	12 gauge		
Assault rifles
Heckler & Koch HK416A5	Germany	Assault rifle	5.56×45mm NATO		11 inch and 14.5 inch barrel lengths in use
Sniper rifles
Steyr SSG 69	Austria	Bolt action sniper rifle	7.62×51mm NATO		
Steyr SSG 04	Austria	Bolt action sniper rifle	7.62×51mm NATO		

=== Less lethal ===
- Taser X26 (electroshock weapon)
- Bean bag rounds
- Stun grenade
- Pepper spray
- Pepper-spray projectile

=== Vehicles ===
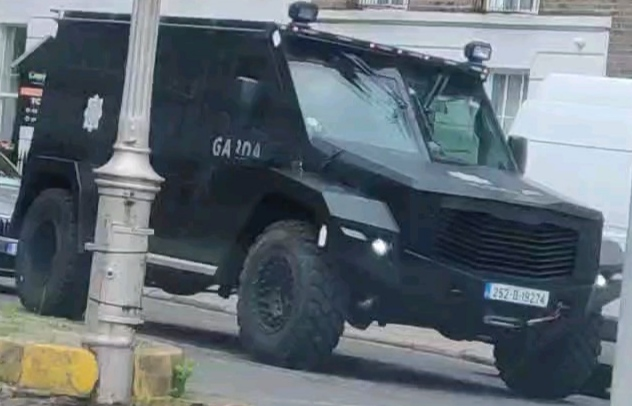
The Garda ERU's Stoof Armoured Tactical Truck on Lower Baggot Street, Dublin.

- BMW 3 Series
- BMW 5 Series
- BMW 5 Series Touring
- BMW 7 Series (armoured)
- BMW X5 (armoured)
- Toyota Land Cruiser
- Audi Q7
- Isuzu D-Max
- Land Rover Discovery 4
- Land Rover Range Rover (armoured)
- Mitsubishi Pajero
- Nissan Patrol (armoured)
- Mercedes-Benz Sprinter (command and control vehicle)
- Ford Ranger (tactical assault vehicle)
- Nissan Navara (tactical assault vehicle)
- Stoof Armoured Tactical Truck (purchased in September 2025 for operations from 2026)

== See also ==
- Army Ranger Wing (ARW)
