= Walther P99 =

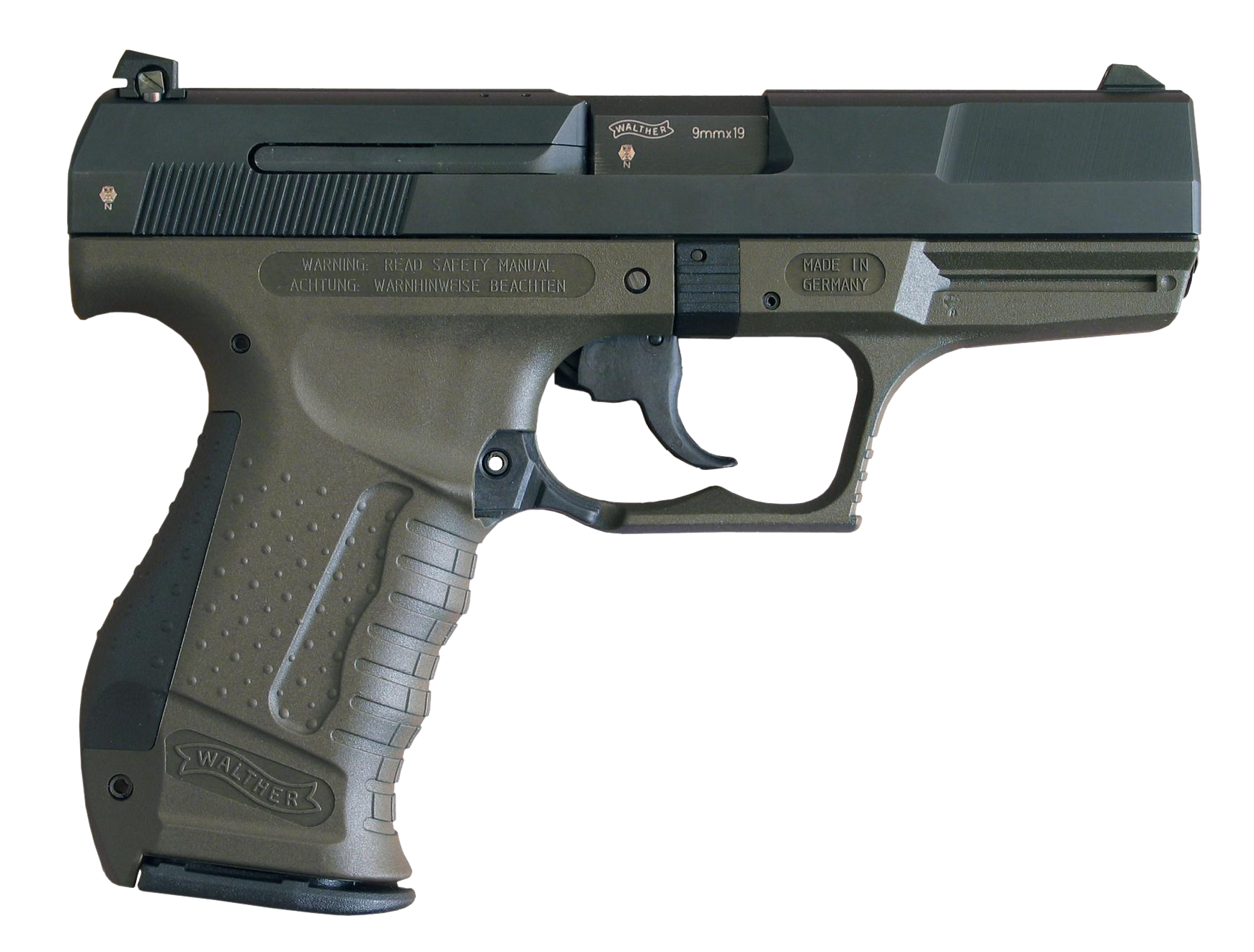
- A first-generation 9mm version, with a green polymer frame.
- Type: Semi-automatic pistol
- Place of origin: Germany

Service history
- In service: 1997–current
- Used by: See Users

Production history
- Designer: Horst Wesp
- Designed: 1994–1996
- Manufacturer: Carl Walther GmbH Sportwaffen
- Produced: 1997–2023 (Canik TP9 remains in production)
- Variants: P99QPQ, P99 Military, P990 (P99DAO), P99QA, P99QNL, P99AS, P99TA, P99C, P99C AS, P99C QA, P99C DAO, P99 RAD, P99Q and SW99

Specifications
- Mass: 630 g (22 oz) (9×19mm); 655 g (23.1 oz) (.40 S&W)
- Length: 180 mm (7.1 in) (9×19mm); 184 mm (7.2 in) (.40 S&W)
- Barrel length: 102 mm (4.0 in) (9×19mm); 106 mm (4.2 in) (.40 S&W)
- Width: 29 mm (1.1 in) (9×19mm); 32 mm (1.3 in) (.40 S&W)
- Height: 135 mm (5.3 in)
- Cartridge: 9×19mm Parabellum.40 S&W; 9×21mm IMI
- Action: Short recoil operated, locked breech
- Muzzle velocity: 408 m/s (1,339 ft/s) (9×19mm); 344 m/s (1,129 ft/s) (.40 S&W)
- Effective firing range: 50 m (55 yd) (9×19mm)
- Feed system: 9×19mm: 10-, 15-, 17- or 20-round detachable box magazine.40 S&W: 10-, 12-, or 14-round box magazine
- Sights: Interchangeable 3-dot notch sight

The Walther P99 (German: [ˈvaltɐ]) is a semi-automatic pistol developed by the German company Carl Walther GmbH Sportwaffen of Ulm for law enforcement, security forces and the civilian shooting market.

== History ==
Design work on this new generation sidearm began in 1994, and the handgun was presented in 1997 with series production commencing that same year as a replacement for the Walther P5 and the P88.

Walther announced the discontinuation of the P99 in early 2023.

=== Evolution ===
The Walther P99 was modified several times throughout its production history, as were the magazines.

When the P99 was introduced the magazine capacities were 16 rounds for 9×19mm Parabellum and 12 rounds for .40 S&W.

Magazines had witness holes on both sides. Later the magazine capacities were reduced to 15 rounds for 9×19mm Parabellum and 11 rounds for .40 S&W while witness holes were introduced at the rear of the magazine to view the loading condition.

==== Second generation models ====
Walther presented a redesigned second generation P99 in 2004, incorporating a modified trigger guard that eliminated the "ski hump", which is clearly visible in the accompanying first generation images, to address user comfort concerns regarding the previous style.

The first generation P99 pistols had a slide release at the left side of the frame while second generation guns may have optional ambidextrous slide stop release levers.

Walther also took the opportunity to redesign the slide so the user could grip it more easily, and notably, change the proprietary accessory rail to a Weaver type.

Some models built in 2005 and all later models received one more design change, an elongated magazine release.

==== P99Q police variant ====
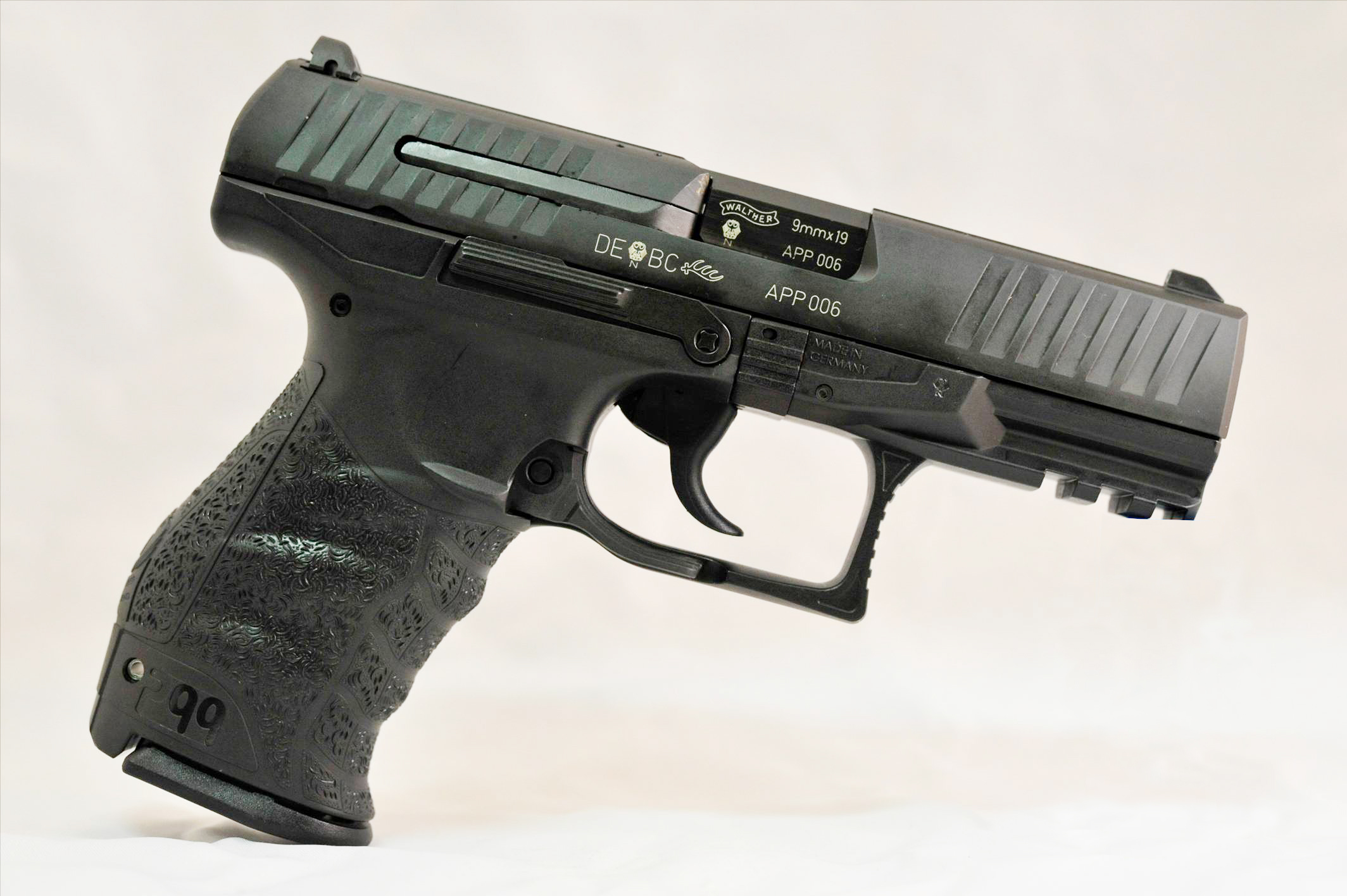
P99Q police duty pistol.

The P99Q is a designated police pistol, which has been certified according to the Technical Specifications (TR) of the German Police (Technische Richtlinie Pistolen im Kaliber 9mm x 19, Revision January 2008).

The P99Q is exclusively manufactured for German and foreign police departments and is not available on the civilian market.

The P99Q has a partially pre-loaded internal striker trigger mechanism that conforms to the Technical Specifications (TR) of the German Police. When the trigger is pulled, the striker is fully cocked and released, firing the pistol.

Trigger travel is approximately 13 mm (0.5 in) with a trigger reset of 6 mm (0.2 in) and a trigger pull of approximately 32 N (7.2 lb_{f}). The trigger pull is consistent in length and force from the first shot to the last.

The Technical Specifications (TR 2008) of the German Police also demand an accuracy of fire for a 10-shot group with German Police certified 9×19mm Parabellum ammunition at 25 m (27 yd) (R_{100}) of ≤ 16 cm (6.3 in).

This equals an accuracy of fire of ≤ 22 minute of angle (MOA) or ≤ 6.4 mrad.

The grip frame has an integrated mounting MIL-STD-1913 (Picatinny) rail for attaching tactical lights and laser sighting devices.

== Production ==
All 9mm P99s have always been completely German made. Some P99 .40 components are manufactured under license by S&W.

The barrel, slide and frame of all 100% German-manufactured P99s bear an "Eagle over N" proof mark of the German Proof House at Ulm.

The mark indicates the pistol was test-fired with a Proof Load; the "N" stands for nitrocellulose.

== Design ==
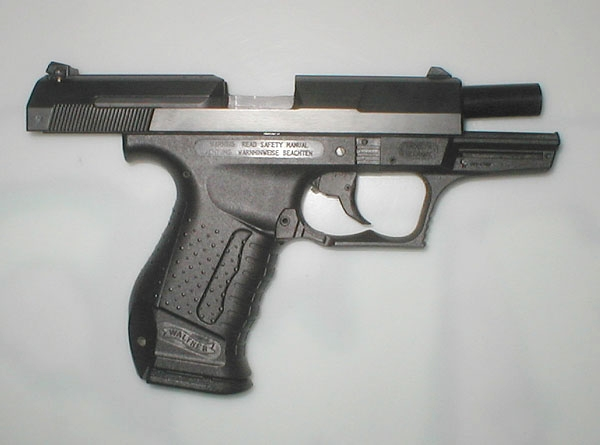
Walther P99 with the slide locked back displaying its vertical barrel tilt.

The Walther P99 is a short recoil-operated locked breech semi-automatic pistol that uses a modified Browning cam-lock system adapted from the Hi-Power pistol.

=== Finishes ===
The P99 has a glassfiber-reinforced polymer frame and steel slide assembly.

It can be broken down into its main parts or field stripped with a take down catch without the help of tools.

The slide and other metal parts of the pistol are Tenifer treated (a nitriding process also used on Glock pistols). The Tenifer finish is between 0.04 and 0.05 mm (0.002 and 0.002 in) in thickness, and is characterized by extreme resistance to wear and corrosion; it penetrates the metal, and treated parts have similar properties even below the surface to a certain depth.

The Tenifer process produces a matte gray-colored, non-glare surface with a 64 Rockwell C hardness rating and a 99% resistance to salt water corrosion (which meets or exceeds stainless steel specifications), making the P99 particularly suitable for individuals carrying the pistol concealed as the highly chloride-resistant finish allows the pistol to better endure the effects of perspiration.

The P99 is available in 4 colorations; a black frame with a black slide, a black frame with a titanium-coated slide, a military olive-drab frame with a black slide, and a desert tan frame with black slide.

All three of these finishes incorporate the same black grip inserts that come with every P99. The compact versions of the P99 are only available in all black.

=== Operation ===
==== Firing ====
The P99 uses an internal striker as opposed to an external hammer, with a red-painted striker tip that protrudes from rear of the slide when the gun is cocked, as well as a loaded chamber indicator on the right side of the slide.

The original, first-generation P99 had a traditional Double-Action/Single-Action trigger with a decocker. When the slide is racked completely to the rear upon loading, the trigger remains in the forward position for the first shot and the Anti-Stress mode is activated, where the striker is cocked but the trigger has the length of pull of the double-action mode. The trigger travel is 14 mm (0.55 in) long in the Anti-Stress mode, but most of the length is slack and is similar in feel to a two-stage rifle trigger.

At the end of the anti-stress travel, the pressure noticeably increases to 4.5 pounds and the user experiences a crisp trigger break and an extremely short trigger reset of about .1 inches. All subsequent shots are fired in standard single action mode, where the slack on the trigger is much shorter, but the point of release feels the same.

In order to deactivate Single-Action or Anti-Stress mode, the user can manipulate the decocker button on the top of the slide, just in front of the rear sights. When decocked from Single-Action mode, the trigger will reset to the full length of its pull.

The pistol is now in Double-Action mode with a pull 7.9 pounds for the full length of the .55 inch pull. After firing the first shot in Double-Action, the pistol will be fired in Single-Action for all subsequent shots.

The striker protrudes visibly and palpably from the back of the slide when the firearm is in a constant partially cocked state. However, the striker of the second generation P99QA variant does not protrude from the back of the slide, unless fired, as the firearm is in a constant partially cocked state.

==== Safety ====
The P99 features four internal safeties, iron sights adjustable for both windage and elevation, tool-less take down, and an ambidextrous magazine release incorporated into the trigger guard.

The lower forward edge of the frame also known as the dust cover has a mounting-bracket or rail interface system for attaching accessories, such as a tactical light or laser sight.

=== Feeding ===
The P99 feeds from staggered-column or double-stack magazines of varying capacity. Walther also offers staggered-column magazines with a +2 baseplate that add 2 rounds to the magazine capacity at the expense of extending the grip and the pistol height by approximately 18 mm (0.7 in).

The .40 S&W caliber models incorporate a slightly larger slide in order to preserve the same recoil spring assembly used in its 9mm counterpart.

=== Ergonomics ===
Ergonomics were a key focus in the design of the firearm, and as a result, three interchangeable grip backstraps are included (small, medium and large) to accommodate various hand shapes and sizes; this feature permits most shooters a comfortable and efficient grip on the firearm.

This adaptable grip was innovative at the time the P99 was introduced.

=== Accessories ===
Fixed metal 3-dot iron sights, fixed tritium night sights, adjustable sports iron sights, adjustable optic fibre iron sights, laser pointers, tactical lights, magazine flashlight adapters, holsters, magazines, magazine loaders, grip extenders and a suppressor kit with a 117 mm (4.6 in) barrel and protective cap for the muzzle threads and a silencer that reduces the sound signature by 33 dB(A) are offered as factory accessories.

== Variants ==
=== AS (Anti Stress) ===
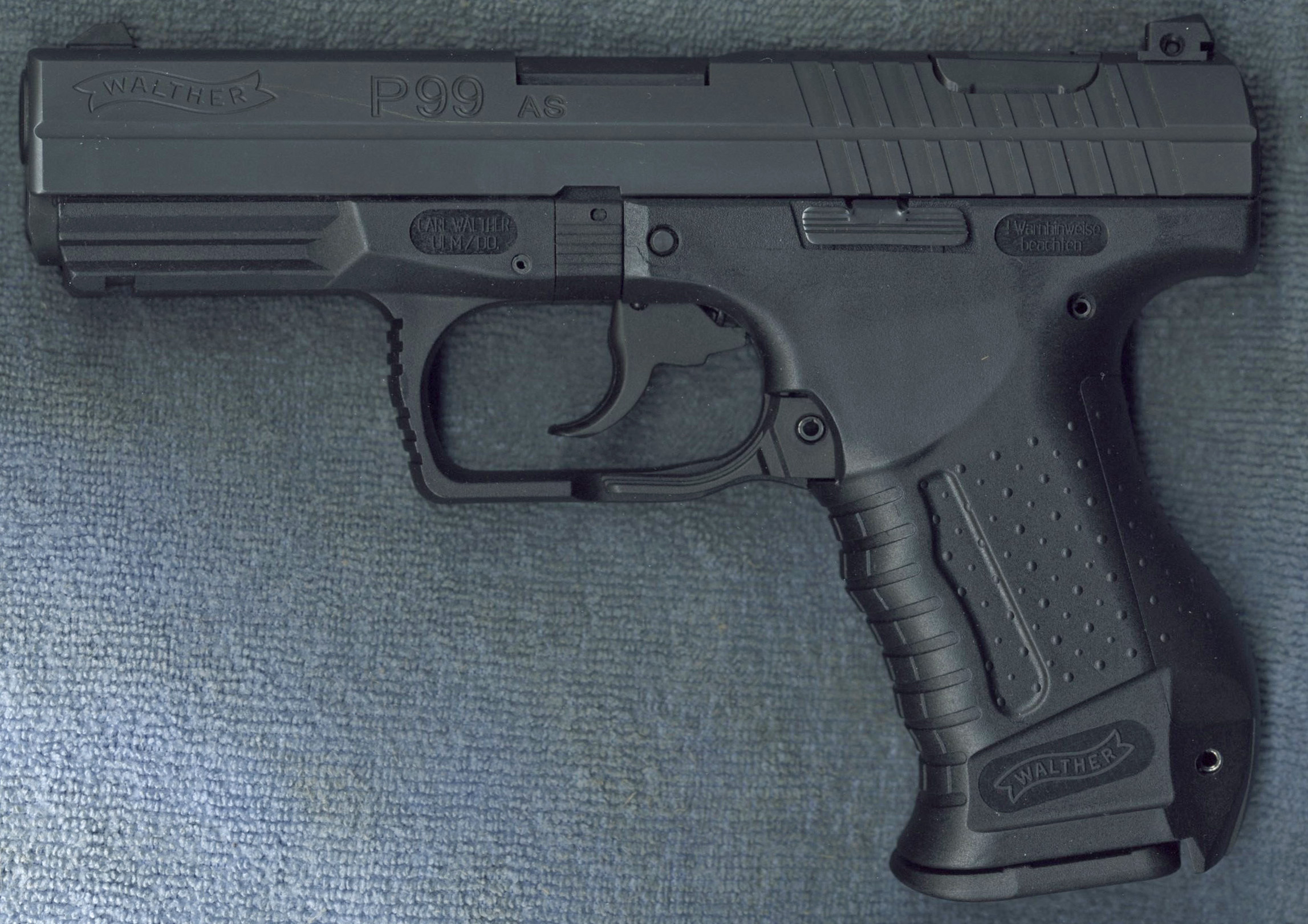
Walther P99AS second generation pistol chambered in .40 S&W.

Introduced in 2004, this variant comes closest to a traditional Double-Action/Single-Action trigger with a decocker.

In Double-Action mode the internal striker is at rest with no pre-load and the trigger travel is 14 mm (0.55 in) long at approximately 38 N (8.5 lb_{f}) trigger pull. When the slide is racked completely to the rear upon (re)loading, the internal striker is manually pre-cocked to Single-Action mode and the trigger remains in the forward position for the first shot and the Anti Stress mode is activated.

The trigger travel is 14 mm (0.55 in) long in the Anti Stress mode at approximately 20 N (4.5 lb_{f}) trigger pull.

On all subsequent shots, the P99AS is automatically pre-cocked and the trigger travel is reduced to 8 mm (0.31 in) at the same 20 N (4.5 lb_{f}) trigger pull.

For manually deactivating the Anti Stress mode and setting the pistol to Double-Action mode the P99AS features a decocking button recessed into the top of the slide, rather than a conventional lever usually found on the side.

The Anti Stress mode can also be manually activated by moving the slide approximately 10 mm (0.39 in) back.

=== DAO (Double Action Only) ===
The P99DAO is similar to the previously produced P990 Double Action Only variant.

The internal striker is at rest with no pre-load. The trigger travel is approximately 14 mm (0.55 in) with a trigger pull of approximately 38 N (8.5 lb_{f}).

The trigger pull is consistent in length and force from the first shot to the last and the striker returns to its de-cocked position after each shot.

=== QA (Quick Action) ===
This variant has a Glock style trigger system with a pre-loaded internal striker.

When the trigger is pulled, the striker is fully cocked and released, firing the pistol.

The trigger travel is approximately 8 mm (0.31 in) with a trigger pull of approximately 38 N (8.5 lb_{f}). The trigger pull is consistent in length and force from the first shot to the last.

The P99QA was announced in 2000 and discontinued in 2011.

=== P99c ===
Compact versions of the P99 available in the 3 preceding action types marketed as the:

- P99c AS (Compact Anti Stress)
- P99c DAO (Compact Double Action Only)
- P99c QA (Compact Quick Action)

=== Training variant ===
==== P99RAM (Real Action Marker) ====
The P99RAM is a training and simulation pistol, equipped with a CO_{2} blow-back system. It fires low-cost Paint- and Rubberball ammunition in caliber .43 in (11 mm).

In its design, controls, and handling, the P99RAM is indistinguishable from the original P99 pistol. Protective clothing is needed to adequately protect the users from Paint- and Rubberball hits during training.

=== Limited editions ===
Walther has also created several limited production runs of the P99 including:

==== MI-6 ====
1st Generation P99, a marketing tie-in with the James Bond film series during Pierce Brosnan's tenure in the role.

==== Year 2000 ====
A limited edition P99 fabricated to commemorate the new millennium. 2000 of these were made to reciprocate the year for which it was issued.

==== P99 TA ====
A model prepared for the police tryouts in Baden-Württemberg in 2002, featuring a single/double-action trigger with redesigned trigger guard, center location ambidextrous decocker and an early ambidextrous slide catch as well as the removal of the "captured" accessory rail in favor of a standard "open" rail system.

Lastly, this model has new contours on the lower frame just ahead of the disassembly clasp, just before the accessory rails to facilitate holstering. Approximately fifty (50) P99 TAs were produced with less than 25 sold to the public (10 imported to the U.S.).

==== Final Edition ====
It was announced in 2023 that Walther will release a limited-edition version of the P99 titled the P99 AS Final Edition.

The gun features a green frame and the engraving "Final Edition" on the slide and is otherwise functionally the same as the regular P99 AS.

=== Fabryka Broni Radom P99 RAD ===
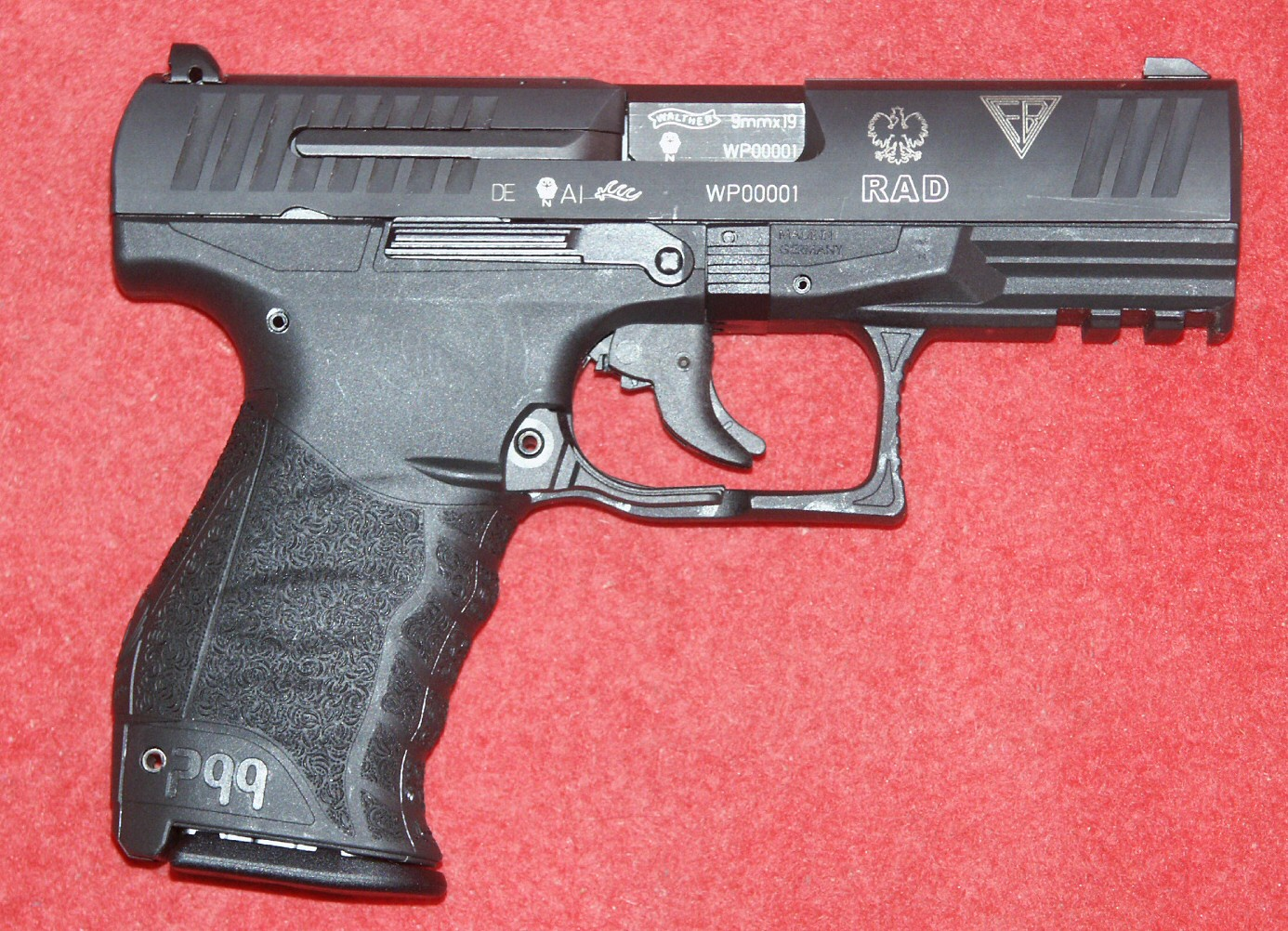
P99 RAD made by Fabryka Broni Radom.

The P99 RAD variant is made under license by Fabryka Broni Radom in Poland and marketed as a military sidearm proposition.

The P99 RAD grip shape and texture has been altered when compared to the P99 variants and an extended ambidextrous slide release and extended ambidextrous magazine release levers are fitted as a standard feature. Besides that the slide shape, dimensions and serrations have been altered. The standard sights are high-contrast 3 dot sights with contrast enhancements that have been painted with afterglow paint that can aid target acquisition under unfavourable lighting conditions. As an option the P99 RAD can also be fitted with self-luminous tritium night sights.

The P99 RAD pistol is available with the DAO trigger mechanism with a trigger pull of approximately 39 N (8.8 lb_{f}) and the QA trigger mechanism with a trigger pull of approximately 32 N (7.2 lb_{f}).

The grip frame has an integrated mounting MIL-STD-1913 (Picatinny) rail for attaching tactical lights and laser sighting devices.

Many of the alterations found in the P99 RAD variant were later applied in the Walther PPQ pistol introduced in 2011 and the P99Q pistol.

=== Smith & Wesson SW99 ===
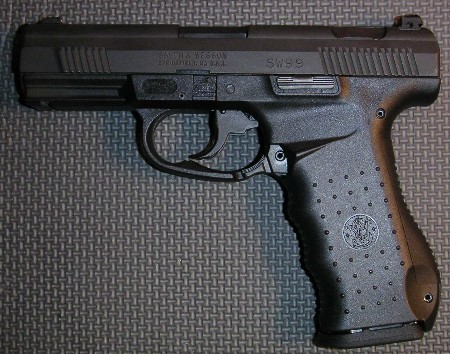
Smith & Wesson SW99.

The Smith & Wesson SW99 is a joint venture between Walther, who produces a modified receiver in Germany, and Smith & Wesson, who fabricates the slides and barrels in the United States.

=== Magnum Research MR Eagle ===
The Magnum Research MR Eagle was another joint American/German venture, with Walther producing a black polymer frame with integral steel rails similar to the P99 series, only differing in grip texture and with the short magazine release paddles from the first gen P99.

For its part, Magnum Research Inc. produced a 416 stainless steel slide and 4140 CrMo steel barrel in their Pillager, MN factory in the United States.The MR Eagle series pistols were available in 9×19mm Parabellum (MR9) and .40 S&W (MR40).

=== Canik TP9 ===
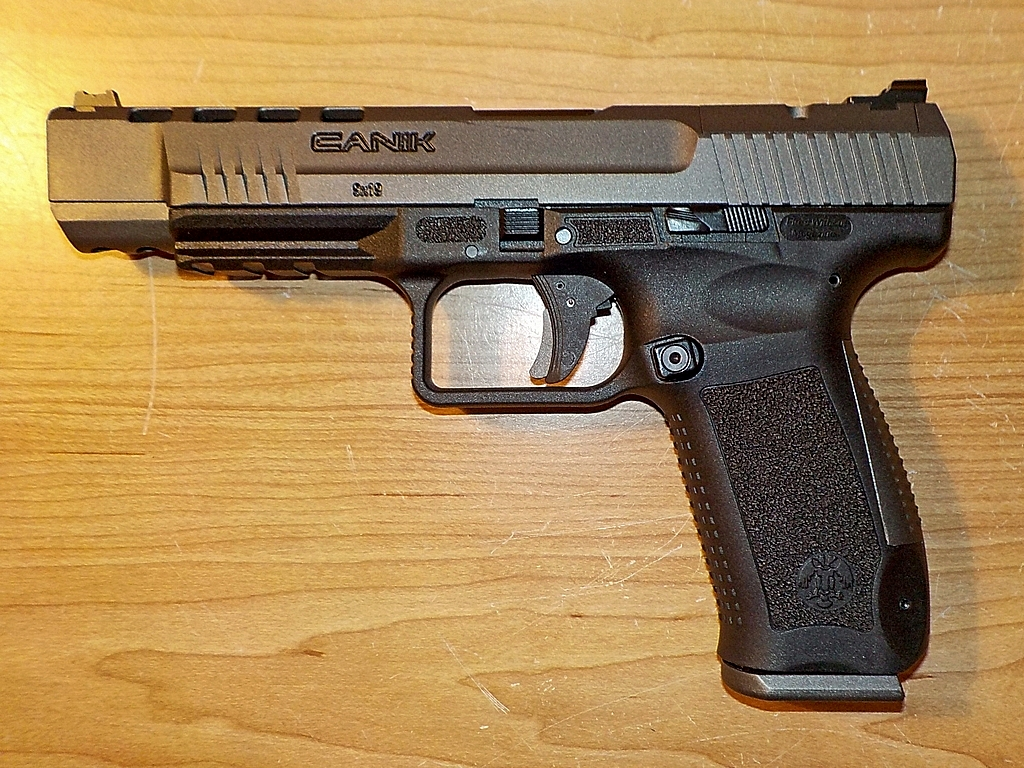
Canik Arms TP9SFx

The Canik TP9 series is a family of semi-automatic pistols manufactured by Turkish firearms company Canik Arms, designed primarily for military, law enforcement, and civilian use. Chambered in 9mm, the TP9 series is known for its affordability, reliability, and advanced features, often found in more expensive handguns. The series draws significant design influence from the Walther P99, particularly in its early models, and also incorporates elements seen in other popular polymer-framed striker-fired pistols such as those from Glock, H&K, and CZ.

The lineup includes several variants to suit different needs:

- TP9SA: A single-action model with a decocker, offering a light and crisp trigger pull for improved accuracy and speed.
- TP9SF: A simplified striker-fired model without a decocker, providing a more streamlined design with consistent trigger performance.
- TP9SFx: Designed for competitive shooting, it features a longer barrel, lightened slide, extended magazine release, and an optics-ready platform for mounting red dot sights.
- TP9 Elite SC: A subcompact version aimed at the concealed carry market, balancing size, capacity, and shootability.

All models in the TP9 series feature polymer frames, striker-fired mechanisms, Picatinny rails, trigger safeties, and interchangeable backstraps, contributing to their ergonomic design and user adaptability. The series has been praised for offering high performance at a lower price point, making it a popular alternative to more expensive competitors in the same category.

== Users ==
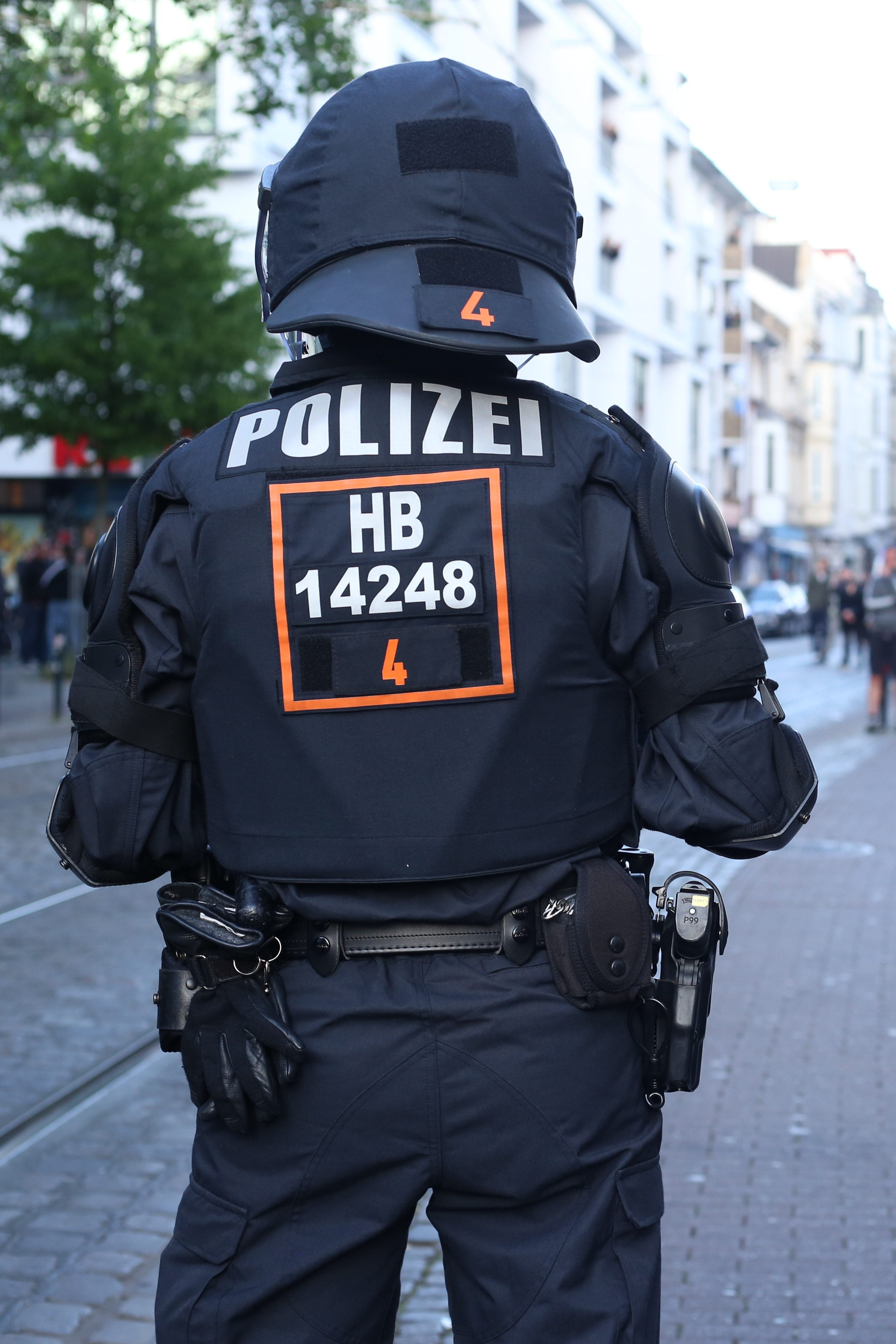
Bremen state police officer with Walther P99

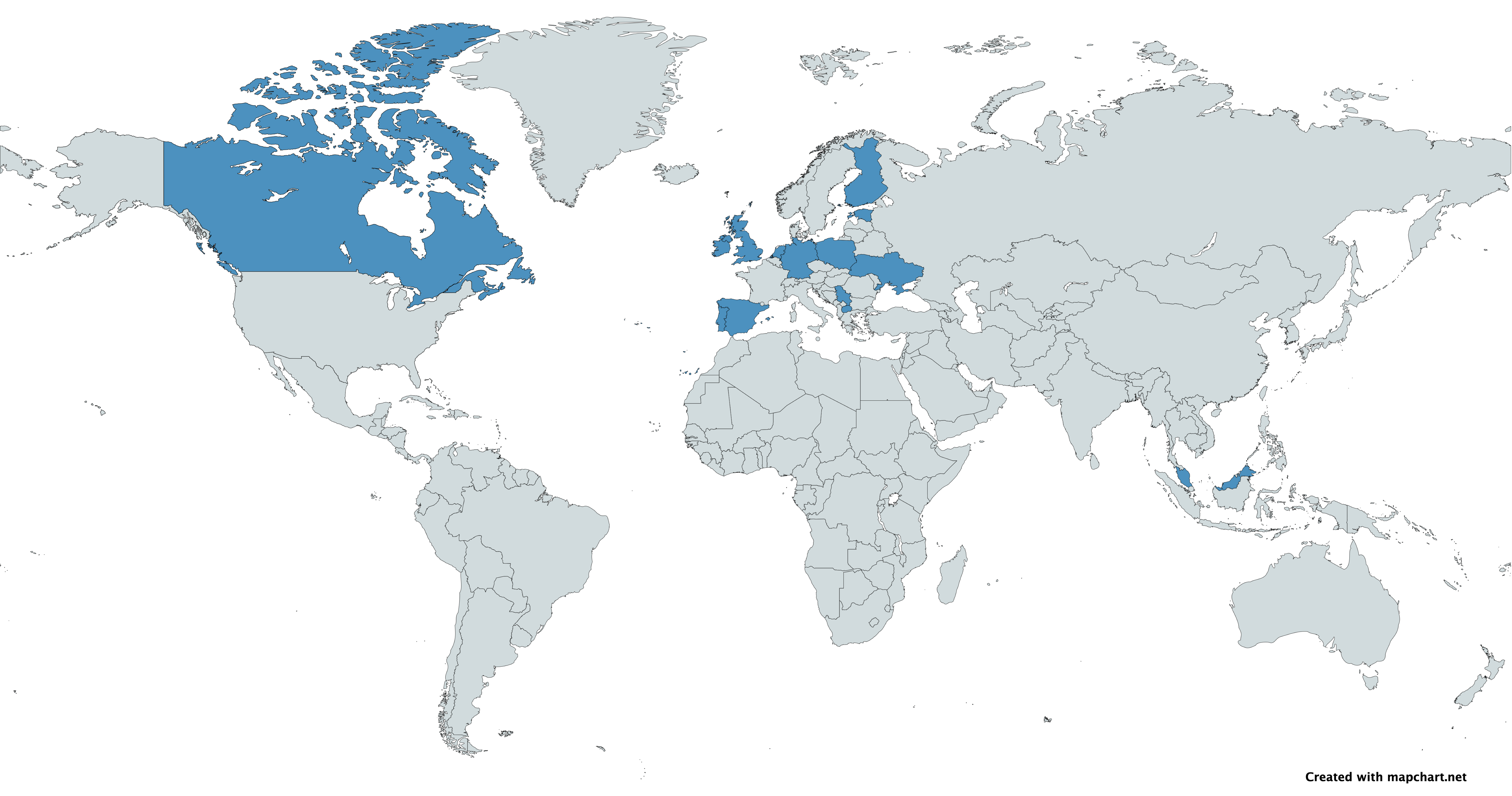
Map with Walther P99 users in blue

- Finland
  - Finnish Defence Forces, designated as the PIST 2003 (Pistooli 2003)
  - Law enforcement in Finland
    - Police of Finland
    - Finnish Customs
    - Finnish Border Guard
- Germany
- Law enforcement in Germany
  - North Rhine-Westphalia Police
  - Rhineland-Palatinate Police
  - Hamburg Police
  - Bremen Police
  - Schleswig-Holstein Police
- Ireland
  - Garda Síochána
    - National Surveillance Unit
    - National Bureau of Criminal Investigation
    - Drugs and Organised Crime Bureau
    - Special Detective Unit
    - Garda Emergency Response Unit
- North Macedonia
- Malaysia
  - Royal Malaysian Police
  - Royal Malaysian Navy
- Netherlands
  - National Police Corps
- Poland
  - Police
- Portugal
  - Polícia de Segurança Pública
  - Autoridade de Segurança Alimentar e Económica
  - Grupo de Intervenção e Operações Especiais da GNR
- Serbia
- Spain
  - Guàrdia Urbana de Barcelona
- Turkey
  - Turkish Armed Forces: The Canik TP9 is a service pistol.
  - General Directorate of Security: Canik TP9 is a service pistol.
- Ukraine
  - Security Service of Ukraine
- United Kingdom
  - Nottinghamshire Police

=== Former users ===
- Canada
  - Service de police de la Ville de Montréal
- Estonia
  - In 2014, the Police and Border Guard Board started to be armed with the P99Q, as a replacement for the currently used Makarov pistol.
  - After just two years in service the Estonian Police and Border Guard have started replacing the Walther P99Q with a custom Glock 19 Gen 4 variant. This was due to issues with the P99Q malfunctioning during training and duty use.
  - Up to 1000 Walther P99Q pistols are expected to remain in service during the transition period.

== Gallery ==
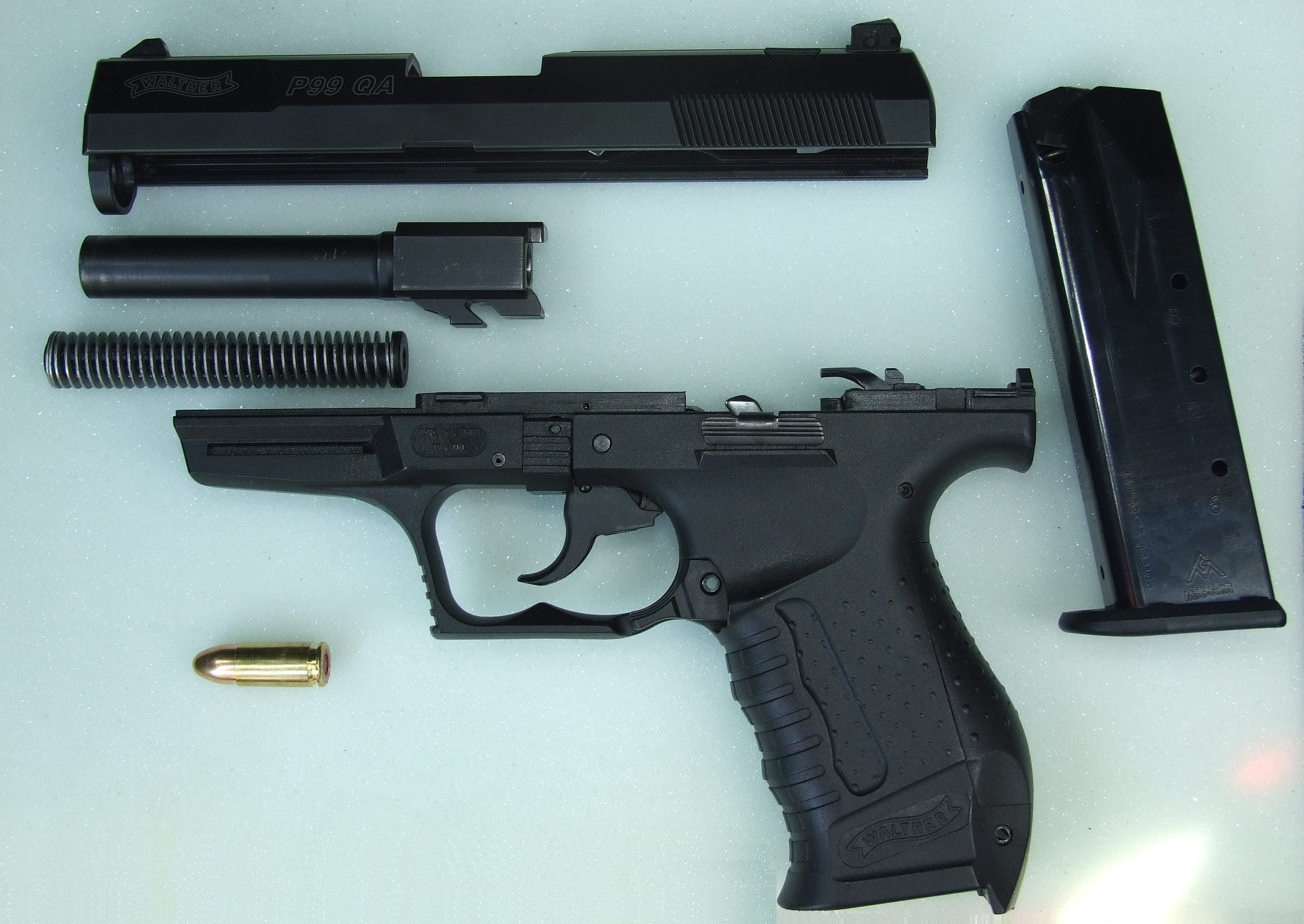
P99QA field stripped to its main parts

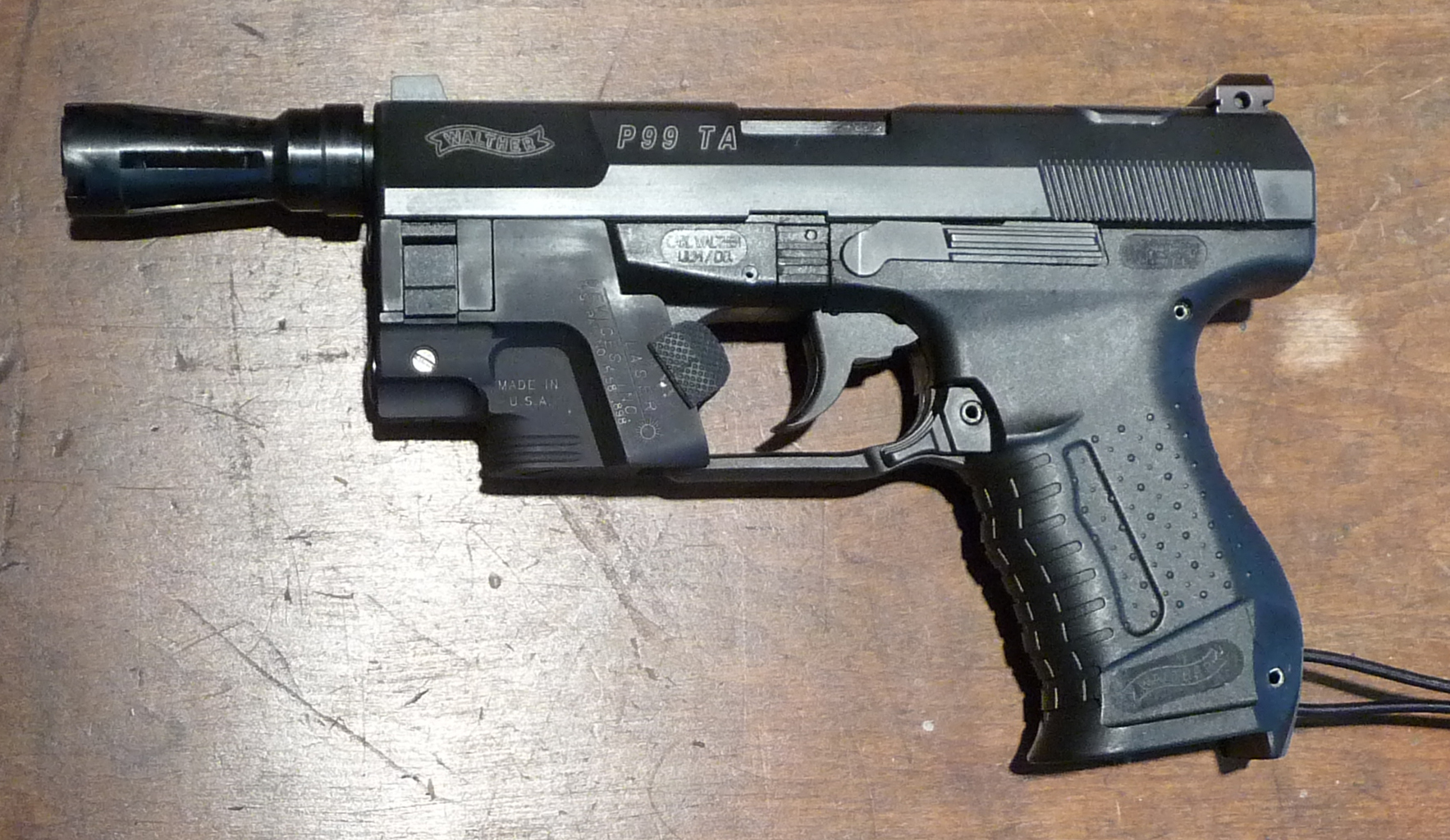
P99 TA with laser unit and flash suppressor

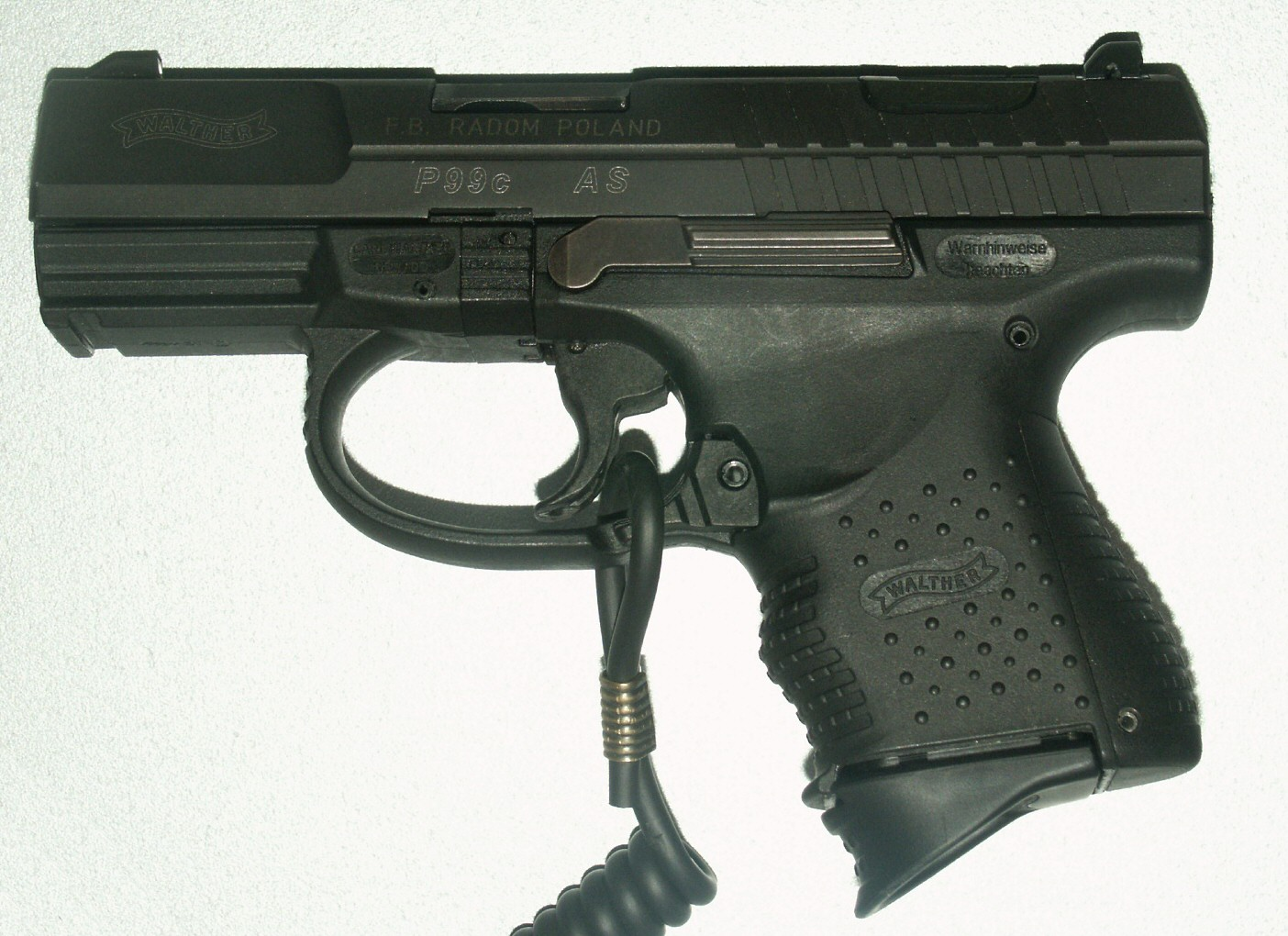
Polish made P99c AS

== See also ==
- Walther P22, a rimfire pistol possessing similar styling and ergonomics chambered in .22 LR.
- Walther PK380, a centerfire pistol also possessing similar styling and ergonomics with an overall size between the P22 and P99, but chambered in .380 ACP.
