= Witness Security Programme =

Unit of the Irish national police

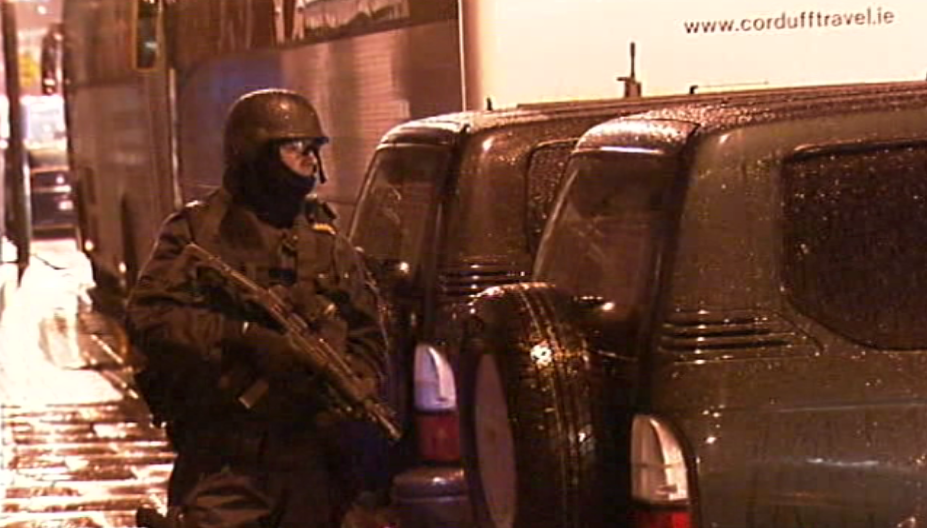
The Garda ERU are typically involved in providing armed protection for the security of witnesses

The Witness Security Programme in Ireland is administered by the Attorney General of Ireland, and is operated by the Garda Síochána, the national police force. Witness protection in Ireland is used in cases of serious, organised crime and terrorism. The programme is under the operational control of the elite Garda Special Detective Unit (SDU), attached to the Garda Crime & Security Branch (CSB).

== Structure and operation ==
The Garda Witness Protection Unit is the small, dedicated and highly secretive group that runs the Witness Security Programme. The Witness Protection Unit is a subsection of the Special Detective Unit, which falls under the remit of the Crime and Security Branch at Garda Headquarters. The unit is headed by a Detective Inspector, who is answerable to the Detective Chief Superintendent in charge of the SDU, the Assistant Commissioner in charge of Crime and Security, and ultimately the Garda Commissioner. All detectives attached to witness protection duties are heavily armed. Further reinforcements can be drawn from the SDU when there is a need. According to the Department of Justice, the Garda Witness Security Programme is operated in "a significant number" of cases, although no details were released as to how many participants are currently under the protection of the programme. The annual budget for the programme was €1.198 million in 2013, and was expected to be the same in 2014.

The Witness Security Programme operates nationally, and was officially established in 1997, following the assassination of journalist Veronica Guerin by a drugs gang she was reporting on, and the subsequent trial that followed, whereby a gang member turned state's witness.

The programme is designed to protect witnesses before, during and after court trials against attempts by criminal and other groups to prevent the normal functioning of the criminal justice system, including threats of violence and systematic witness intimidation, and where otherwise the witnesses may refuse to testify. In circumstances where the Senior Investigation Officer (Garda Síochána) in a case has identified a witness who is crucial to the case and the evidence to be proffered is not available elsewhere, and where there is a credible threat to the life of the witness and/or their family, an application can be made - with the consent of the witness - to have them included in the Witness Security Programme. Relatives of those who are under the protection of the programme may be protected and relocated if their safety is deemed to be at risk. The majority of those in the programme have been involved in criminal activity themselves. The Minister for Justice will only grant protection to those who cooperate with investigations conducted by the Garda Síochána. According to the Office of the Director of Public Prosecutions (DPP), it is estimated that 25% of crimes in Ireland are not reported due to intimidation, and one in 10 crimes reported to Gardaí result in overt intimidation against witnesses, often culminating in the collapse of prosecutions.

Witnesses in the programme are given a new identity, address and armed police protection either in Ireland or abroad (generally in Anglophone countries, such as the United Kingdom, United States, Canada, Australia, New Zealand, South Africa and mainland Europe). Law enforcement in host countries may cooperate with the Garda Síochána in providing security for witnesses in the programme, such as the United States Marshals Service. Protectees are usually provided with financial assistance, as they must leave their employment. Court appearances by witnesses in protection are carried out under the security of the Garda Emergency Response Unit (ERU), the premier armed tactical operations group in Irish law enforcement (and a section of the SDU). The Irish Prison Service may also be involved in providing security to witnesses if they are in prison at the time. There has never been a reported breach of security in which a protectee was harmed.

== Legislation ==
Legislation was not required to establish the programme, but its operation is supported by a number of legislative provisions. The intimidation of witnesses is an offence pursuant to Section 41 of the Criminal Justice Act 1999. Section 41 specifies the offence as harming, threatening or menacing, or in any other way intimidating or putting in fear another person who is assisting in the investigation of an offence by the Garda Síochána, with the intention of causing the investigation or course of justice to be obstructed, perverted or interfered with. The offence is punishable on indictment by a fine and/or a term of imprisonment of up to 15 years. Section 40 of the same Act makes it an offence for any person, without lawful authority, to make an attempt to identify the whereabouts or any new identity of a witness who has been relocated under the programme. The offence is punishable on indictment by a fine and/or a term of imprisonment of up to five years.

== See also ==
- Attorney General of Ireland
- Garda Crime & Security Branch (CSB)
- Garda Special Detective Unit (SDU)
- Garda Emergency Response Unit (ERU)
- Criminal Assets Bureau (CAB)
- Murder of Veronica Guerin
- Charles Bowden (criminal)
- United States Federal Witness Protection Program
