= Arthur Cox (New Zealand cricketer) =

New Zealand cricketer

Personal information
- Born: 7 December 1904; Christchurch, New Zealand
- Died: 20 September 1977 (aged 72); Christchurch, New Zealand
- Batting: Right-handed
- Role: Batsman

Domestic team information
- Years: Team
- 1924–25 to 1926–27: Canterbury

Career statistics
Competition	First-class
Matches	5
Runs scored	396
Batting average	49.50
100s/50s	1/2
Top score	204
Catches/stumpings	1/–
- Source: Cricinfo, 18 December 2021

Arthur Cox (7 December 1904 – 20 September 1977) was a New Zealand cricketer. He played in five first-class matches for Canterbury from 1924 to 1927.

In Cox's second first-class match, which began on Christmas Day 1925, he opened the batting and scored 204 in 280 minutes against Otago. It was only the second double-century in the Plunket Shield. Canterbury went on to make 495 and win by an innings and 28 runs. Eyesight trouble ended his career during the 1927–28 season.
