= Arthur Cox (ornithologist) =

English ornithologist

Arthur Henry Machell Cox
- Born: 11 November 1870; Hazelwood, Derbyshire, England
- Died: 1968
- Education: Trinity College, Cambridge
- Occupation: Ornithologist

Arthur Henry Machell Cox (11 November 1870 – 1968) was an English ornithologist.

Cox was born in Hazelwood, Derbyshire, England, on 11 November 1870. He was educated at Trinity College, Cambridge, before working as a teacher and then headmaster at various schools in Devon. He contributed to ornithological research in Devon, was a founding member of the Devon Bird Watching and Preservation Society in 1928 and, from its inception in 1931, a member of the Cornwall Bird Watching and Preservation Society.

At one time he lived in Yelverton.

He died in 1968, by which time he had moved to Somerset.
