= Arthur Cox (law firm) =

Irish law firm partnership

- Headquarters: Ten Earlsfort Terrace; Dublin, Ireland
- No. of offices: 5 offices in 3 countries
- No. of lawyers: 312 (2020)
- No. of employees: 900 (2022)
- Major practice areas: General corporate practice
- Key people: Geoff Moore (Managing Partner); Ailish Finnerty (Chair )
- Date founded: 1920
- Founder: Arthur Cox
- Company type: Limited liability partnership
- Website: www.arthurcox.com

Arthur Cox is an Irish corporate law firm headquartered in Dublin, with offices in Belfast, London, New York City, and San Francisco. It is one of Ireland's leading law firms, being the third largest by number of practicing solicitors in 2023.

== History ==
Arthur Cox & Co commenced practice in 1920 at 5 St Stephen's Green, in a premises shared with JS Evans & Co. Ltd. There were two partners – Arthur Cox and John McArevey. The firm initially benefitted from instructions from Sir Horace Plunkett, South Dublin Unionist Party MP, who Cox had met through a friend's membership of The Arts Club. This was despite Cox's father's close friendship with John Dillon, who had been a lifelong opponent of Plunkett's. The firm was involved in certain aspects of the negotiations of the Anglo-Irish Treaty, with Cox claiming to have traveled to London by mail boat on eight occasions. The principal business of the firm in its early years was Cox assisting his University College Dublin friends, Ministers Kevin O'Higgins, Patrick Hogan, Patrick McGilligan, who were engaged in the building of the Irish Free State. In 1922, the firm was instructed by the first Attorney General of Ireland, Hugh Kennedy, to prepare an opinion on the legal status of the Irish Free State in the aftermath of the Anglo-Irish Treaty, with Cox having been part of the delegation sent to London in 1921 to negotiate the terms of the treaty, whereas Kennedy had not been, to the regret of Michael Collins.

Arthur Cox & Co acted as solicitors to the Irish White Cross, set up in 1920 to relieve the distress of the civilian population after the arrival of the Black and Tans. Arthur advised Áine Ceannt on her role as secretary and trustee of the association.

Cox was widely acknowledged to be the architect of the Companies Act, 1963.

Eugene McCague served as managing partner of the firm from 1999 to 2003, and as chairman from 2006 to 2013.

== 2011 to present ==
In 2011, Arthur Cox advised the Government of Ireland in relation to Ireland's sovereign bailout under the European Financial Stability Facility.

In 2017, the firm moved to a new purpose-built building over 12,000 sq.m. in size at Ten Earlsfort Terrace, to accommodate over 800 staff.

In 2019, Arthur Cox was reported as the top M&A legal advisor in Ireland.

In 2019, Arthur Cox was the subject of protests by the family of a Christian, former associate.

In 2019, Geoff Moore took over as managing partner of the firm from Brian O'Gorman.

In 2020, the law firm was awarded "Ireland Law Firm of the Year" at the Chambers Europe Awards and European Corporate Team of the Year at The Lawyer European Awards

In 2022, the firm was named as "Ireland Legal Adviser of the Year" at the Mergermarket European M&A Awards 2022

In 2024, the firm was named "Ireland Law Firm of the Year" at the Lexology Index Awards

In 2025, Ailish Finnerty was appointed Chair of the Firm, taking over from Orla O'Connor.

in 2026, the firm was named "Ireland Law Firm of the Year" at the Chambers Europe Awards 2026
