= Arthur Somers-Cocks =

English-born West Indian cricketer

Arthur Somers-Cocks (19 May 1870 – 9 February 1923) was an English-born West Indian cricketer: a right-handed batsman and right arm fast bowler who played ten first-class games for Barbados around the turn of the twentieth century. Nine of these matches came between the 1894/95 and 1896/97 seasons, with a final appearance in 1901/02.

Playing against R. S. Lucas' XI at Bridgetown in February 1895, Somers-Cocks achieved a career-best innings return of 8–99. In 1896/97 he took a hat-trick against A Priestley's XI at the same ground.

He was born in Bredbury, Stockport, Cheshire; he died aged 52 at Harrison College, Bridgetown.
