= Garda Crime and Security Branch =

Major unit of the Irish police and security force

- Irish: Bhrainse Coireachta agus Slándála

Agency overview
- Preceding agency: C3
- Jurisdiction: Ireland
- Headquarters: Phoenix Park, Dublin (D8)53°21′13.4″N 6°17′54.5″W
- Employees: Undisclosed
- Annual budget: Undisclosed (part of Garda Síochána budget, €1.34 billion in 2014)
- Minister responsible: Helen McEntee, TD, Minister for Justice, Home Affairs and Migration
- Agency executives: Justin Kelly, Garda Commissioner; Michael McElgunn, Assistant Commissioner of Crime and Security
- Parent agency: Garda Síochána
- Website: Official website

The Crime and Security Branch (CSB) (Irish: Brainse Coireachta agus Slándála) – previously known as C3 – is responsible for the administration of national security, counter terrorism and serious crime investigations within the Garda Síochána, the national police force of Ireland. The section oversees intelligence relating to subversive, paramilitary and terrorism matters, conducts counter-intelligence, liaises with foreign law enforcement agencies, handles confidential informants, administers VIP and witness protection, monitors potential corrupt Garda officers and provides information on threats to the state to the Garda Commissioner and Government of Ireland.

The Crime & Security Branch comprises a number of Garda units, which it collects information from and issues directives to. The Garda CSB is based at Garda Headquarters in the Phoenix Park, Dublin. It is headed by the Assistant commissioner in charge of Crime and Security, and is staffed mainly by senior officers and intelligence analysts. The branch is responsible for up to 500 Garda officers in other units, who are mainly detectives with investigative duties. CSB maintain the National Intelligence Database, which collates intelligence received from all its sources, and is linked to that of G2.

== Organisational structure ==
- Security and Intelligence Section (S&I)
  - National Surveillance Unit (NSU)
- Liaison and Protection Section
- Crime Policy and Administration Section
- Special Detective Unit (SDU)
  - Emergency Response Unit (ERU)
  - Counter-Terrorism International (CTI)
  - Hostage Negotiation Section (HNS)
  - Witness Security Programme
- Analysis Service
  - Bomb Data Centre

== Responsibilities ==
=== Security & Intelligence ===
The role of this section is to identify and analyse the threat to the state from terrorists, citizens challenging authority and organised crime gangs. The section is accordingly divided into two sub-sections dealing with intelligence in relation to both terrorism and organised crime. The section supports operational units by providing intelligence leads relative to both areas. Security & Intelligence (S&I) is the central point of contact for the Garda Síochána with all external agencies – both law enforcement and security/intelligence – with regard to international co-operation in the fight against terrorism and organised crime.

=== Liaison & Protection ===
This section is responsible for the protective security of the state and its institutions. The section also has a strong liaison function, housing both the Interpol National Central Bureau and the Europol National Unit. These are the central points of contact for secure communications between the Garda Síochána and all external agencies. Liaison & Protection also encompasses the Schengen Information System (SIS) of which Ireland is a member. A number of Garda Liaison Officers (GLO) attached to Liaison & Protection are posted abroad, including in foreign Irish embassies. The section coordinates the work of a number of European Union (EU) Council Working groups attended by Garda representatives. It also has an administrative role in relation to the Witness Security Programme.

=== Crime Policy & Administration ===
This section is responsible for:

- Implementation of strategic policy
- Mutual Assistance and Extradition in conjunction with the Department of Justice, Home Affairs and Migration
- Liaising with the Central Statistics Office (CSO) regarding crime statistics
- Providing legal advice to the Garda Commissioner and the organisation in general
- Coordinating the issuing and renewal of firearms licenses
- Parole Board Applications
- The Hague Convention regarding separated couples' issues
- Betting Act applications from non-residents

The Missing Persons Bureau is part of Crime, Policy & Administration.

=== Special Detective Unit ===
The Special Detective Unit (SDU) is responsible for the investigation of threats to state security and the monitoring of persons who pose a threat to this on both national and international fronts. The SDU also provides security for visiting VIPs, cash-in-transit movements and armed response. The SDU is the operational wing of the Witness Security Programme. The highly trained and equipped specialist armed intervention unit, the Emergency Response Unit (ERU), is also part of the SDU.

=== Analysis Service ===
The Garda Síochána Analysis Service (GSAS) is responsible for providing analytical support to the Garda organisation. GSAS Management and Analyst staff provide valuable support at both a Regional, and National level, in relation to both operational and strategic policing initiatives. The Research Unit, based in the Garda College, also sit alongside the GSAS. The Research Unit conduct internal and external surveys and have been involved in the evaluation of policing initiatives in order to identify effective practice.

== See also ==
- Garda Special Detective Unit (SDU)
- Garda Emergency Response Unit (ERU)
- Garda Counter-Terrorism International (CTI)
- Garda National Surveillance Unit (NSU)
- Witness Security Programme
- Irish Military Intelligence Service (IMIS)
- National Cyber Security Centre (NCSC)
