= Drugs and Organised Crime Bureau =

Specialist national unit within the Irish police

The Garda National Drugs and Organised Crime Bureau (DOCB or GNDOCB) is a specialist national unit within the Garda Síochána, Ireland's national police service, responsible for proactively targeting and investigating drug trafficking and serious organised crime both within Ireland and outside the jurisdiction. The Drugs and Organised Crime Bureau has a complement of 111 Detective Gardaí and a total staff of up to 400 officers, all of whom are armed.

The bureau is based at Walter Scott House, Dublin 8. It is headed by a Detective Chief Superintendent and four Detective Superintendents, reporting to the Assistant Commissioner in charge of Organised and Serious Crime.

Detective Chief Superintendent Séamus Boland is the current head of the Garda Drugs and Organised Crime Bureau.

== History ==
The Drugs and Organised Crime Bureau was formed in February 2015 with the amalgamation of the Garda National Drugs Unit (GNDU) and Garda Organised Crime Unit (OCU) as part of the Irish government's National Drugs Strategy 2009-2016. The National Drugs Unit had been operating since its creation in 1995, often working in tandem with the newer Organised Crime Unit, which was set up on a pilot basis in 2005 and became an established entity in 2008. The merger was announced by Garda Commissioner Nóirín O'Sullivan during tough budgetary times in an effort to create a more effective and proactive drugs "super unit". Organised and serious crime is also the responsibility of the larger Garda National Bureau of Criminal Investigation (NBCI), and the new bureau works closely with the Garda National Immigration Bureau (GNIB) and other law enforcement agencies on the international front.

Ireland has become a gateway to the European market for international drug smuggling gangs, as well as the domestic market, which has seen disputes spill over into targeted assassinations on the streets of Irish cities. Previous seizures by Gardaí, the Irish Naval Service and the Revenue Commissioners Customs have come close to topping €1 billion, with one individual seizure of cocaine off the Irish coast in 2008 estimated to be worth €750 million. From 2009 to 2014 there have been over 700 arrests of drug dealers who were infiltrated by undercover Gardaí. There have been cases which involved members of the undercover drug unit who were so convincing posing as drug addicts that they were arrested by other undercover Gardaí who did not actually believe they were part of the undercover unit.

== Weapons ==
Detectives and undercover Gardaí attached to the Drugs and Organised Crime Bureau carry semi-automatic 9mm SIG Sauer P226, Walther P99 and concealable 99c pistols due to the dangerous nature of their work.

== Mandate ==
The main focus of the bureau is on;

- dismantling organised drug networks involved in the large scale importation and distribution of controlled substances
- intelligence-led surveillance and undercover operations against organised criminal groups
- criminality that transcends garda divisional boundaries, including; armed robberies, hijacking of valuable loads and commodities, warehouse burglaries, "tiger kidnappings", cash-in-transit robberies and bank robberies with the use of firearms

== See also ==
- Criminal Assets Bureau (CAB)
- Garda National Bureau of Criminal Investigation (NBCI)
- Garda Bureau of Fraud Investigation (GBFI)
