= National Bureau of Criminal Investigation =

Irish police unit

Garda National Bureau of Criminal Investigation
- Irish: An Biúró Náisiúnta um Imscrúdú Coiriúil

Agency overview
- Formed: 1997; 29 years ago
- Preceding agency: Garda Central Detective Unit (CDU)
- Jurisdiction: Ireland
- Headquarters: Walter Scott House, Military Road, Dublin (D8) 53°20′03.5″N 6°15′50.3″W
- Employees: Undisclosed
- Annual budget: Undisclosed (part of Garda Síochána budget, €1.34 billion in 2014)
- Minister responsible: Jim O'Callaghan, TD, Minister for Justice
- Agency executives: Drew Harris, Garda Commissioner; Justin Kelly, Assistant Commissioner, Assistant Commissioner of Organised & Serious Crime; Ger Egan, Detective Chief Superintendent in charge of GNBCI
- Parent agency: Organised & Serious Crime; Garda Síochána
- Website: Official website

Heavily armed NBCI detectives conduct a stop-and-search on a drug gang suspect in Limerick City (see Limerick feud)

The Garda National Bureau of Criminal Investigation (GNBCI) (Irish: An Biúró Náisiúnta um Imscrúdú Coiriúil) - formerly known as the Central Detective Unit (CDU) (Irish: An Príomhaonad Bleachtaireachta) - is the main national criminal investigative branch of the Garda Síochána, the national police force of Ireland.

The unit is responsible for the investigation of organised and serious crime on a national level. It was formed in 1997 with the amalgamation of a number of national and specialist investigation units.

The Garda NBCI is headed by a Detective Chief Superintendent, who reports to the Assistant Commissioner in charge of Organised & Serious Crime.

The bureau is headquartered at Walter Scott House, Military Road, Dublin City, and operates throughout the country.

== History ==
The NBCI was established on 21 January 1997, centralising other investigative branches around the country, as a response to the proliferation of serious and organised crime. Its predecessor was the Garda Central Detective Unit (CDU).

== Organization ==
The Garda National Bureau of Criminal Investigation consists mainly of detectives, who are generally senior investigators, and is headed by an officer of Detective Chief Superintendent rank. The head of the Garda NBCI reports to the Assistant Commissioner in charge of Special Crime Operations, who reports directly to the Garda Commissioner. Its main function is to provide a specialist investigative response to serious criminal activity, supporting other Garda units and/or local investigators in their investigation into serious crimes.

The NBCI is the main unit within the Gardaí that investigates internal Garda criminality and corruption.

=== Headquarters ===
The NBCI operates from Walter Scott House, Military House, Dublin 8. NBCI officers are mostly experienced detectives, who have been promoted to the unit from other investigative units, and the majority have spent time as local/regional detectives. All officers within the NBCI are armed. The unit receives funding for specialist equipment (such as investigative tools, weapons and vehicles) which other areas of the force does not possess, and therefore more serious crimes and crimes of a sensitive nature are investigated by the NBCI.

=== Structure ===
The Garda NBCI houses the following sub-units;

- Anti-Racketeering Unit
- Arts and Antiques Unit
- Stolen Motor Vehicle Investigation Unit (SMVIU)
- Environmental Crime Unit
- Criminal Investigation Unit
- Serious Crime Review Team ("Cold Case Unit")

=== International cooperation ===
The NBCI works closely with other Garda units, and law enforcement agencies from other countries when there is an international dimension to investigations, such as the Police Service of Northern Ireland (PSNI), Metropolitan Police Service and National Crime Agency (NCA) in the United Kingdom.

== Remit ==
- Murder
- Stolen Motor Vehicles & Plant Machinery
- Serious & Organised Crime
- Theft of Computer Components
- Anti-Racketeering
- Arts and Antiques Thefts
- Environmental Crime
- Postal and Telegraphy Thefts and Fraud
- Intellectual Property Rights Violations
- Review of Major Investigations
- Cold Case Investigations
- Extradition of Fugitives
- Internal Investigation of Corruption / Criminality

The responsibility for the investigation of crime rests with local Garda Superintendents, the NBCI provides expertise and skills in the investigation of serious and organised crime. Bureau staff members assist in all aspects of the investigation including;

- Preliminary enquiries
- Case management
- Incident Room management
- General investigation
- File preparation
- Interviewing of Suspects and Witnesses

Specialist investigation teams from NBCI carry out these tasks when requested by local Garda officers or on the direction of senior Garda Management.

== Weapons ==
Unlike regular uniformed Garda officers – who are unarmed – detectives of the NBCI are plainclothes armed officers. NBCI detectives are armed and receive a higher standard of firearms training than regular Garda detectives, due to the nature of their work.

NBCI officers are routinely armed with either of the following;

- SIG Sauer P226 (9×19mm Parabellum semi-automatic pistol)
- Walther P99 (9×19mm Parabellum semi-automatic pistol)

== See also ==
- Criminal Assets Bureau (CAB)
- Garda Drugs and Organised Crime Bureau
- National Economic Crime Bureau (GNECB)
