= Arthur Cox (lawyer) =

Irish solicitor, politician and priest (1891–1965)

Senator
- In office 22 July 1954 – 22 May 1957
- Constituency: Nominated by the Taoiseach

Personal details
- Born: 25 July 1891 Dublin, Ireland
- Died: 11 June 1965 (aged 73) Monze, Zambia
- Party: Independent
- Spouse: Brigid O'Higgins (m. 1940; died 1961)
- Education: University College Dublin

Arthur Conor Joseph Cox (25 July 1891 – 11 June 1965) was an Irish solicitor, politician and priest.

Cox was born on 25 July 1891 in Dublin, to Michael Cox, a medical doctor, and Elizabeth Cox (née Nolan).

He studied at Belvedere College and University College Dublin (UCD), where he graduated in 1913. As a student at UCD, he served as Auditor of the Literary and Historical Society from 1912 to 1913. During his time at university he came to know many who later took leading positions in the Irish Free State.

From 1915 onwards, he practised as a solicitor in Ireland, and in 1920 established the legal firm which still bears his name.

He was nominated by the Taoiseach to the 8th Seanad in 1954. He lost his seat at the 1957 Seanad election.

In 1940, he married Brigid O'Higgins (née Cole), the widow of his friend Kevin O'Higgins. She died in 1961, and he was ordained a priest in 1963. He went on a mission to Zambia where he died in a motor accident in 1965.

== See also ==
- Arthur Cox (law firm)
