= Witness protection =

Judicial procedure

Witness protection is security provided to a threatened person providing testimonial evidence to the justice system, including defendants and other clients, before, during, and after trials, usually by police. While witnesses may only require protection until the conclusion of a trial, in particularly extreme cases, some witnesses are provided with new identities and may live out the rest of their lives under government protection. Protection is typically needed when their safety is at risk due to the potential for retaliation. The program aims to ensure their safety and encourage them to cooperate with law enforcement by providing information that can help solve cases and bring criminals to justice. It is an important tool in maintaining the integrity of the justice system and protecting those who are willing to come forward with crucial information.

Witness protection is usually required in trials against organized crime, where law enforcement sees a risk for witnesses to be intimidated by colleagues of defendants. It is also used in war crime, espionage and national security trials.

== Witness protection by country ==
Not all countries have formal witness protection programs; instead, local police may implement informal protection as the need arises in specific cases. The programs provide support, sometime even including financial support and counseling, to help witnesses rebuild their lives. It's an important measure in safeguarding the well-being of those who come forward to assist in the pursuit of justice.

=== Australia ===
The Australian Federal Police administers the National Witness Protection Program under The National Witness Protection Act 1994, which delivers protection and assistance to witnesses and others identified as being at risk. Not all witnesses are eligible for the Witness Protection Program. The decision to admit a witness into the program is made on a case-by-case basis and involves a rigorous assessment process.

=== Canada ===
Canada's Witness Protection Program Act received royal assent on June 20, 1996. The program is run by the Royal Canadian Mounted Police (RCMP), with support by all levels of government and police forces. The program takes into account the unique circumstances of each case and tailors its approach to meet the specific needs of the witness and their situation. Similar to other countries, the WPP provides participants with new identities, including new name and documents. It also offers relocation assistance to ensure their safety.

=== Hong Kong ===
Several departments of the Security Bureau of Hong Kong have specialized units to provide protection for witnesses and their families who face threats to their life. Notable units include the Witness Protection Unit (WPU) of the Hong Kong Police Force, the Witness Protection and Firearms Section (R4) of the ICAC, and the WPU of the Hong Kong Customs.

The members of these units undergo training in protection, firearms, self-defence, physical and tactical training. They are mostly trained in the use of, and issued, the Glock 19 compact handgun as sidearm. A new identity could be given to a witness, and the government may relocate them far from Hong Kong if the witness is still being threatened after the end of the trial.

=== Indonesia ===
In 2006, Indonesia enacted the Law n. 13 on Witness and Victim Protection, which introduced for the first time the legal qualifications of witness, (crimes) victim, complainant and justice collaborator within the Indonesian Criminal Procedure Code (KUHAP). In Indonesia, justice collaborators play an important role especially for the activities of the Corruption Eradication Commission, since "corruption in Indonesia is committed collectively".

=== Ireland ===
The Witness Security Programme in Ireland is administered by the Attorney General, and is operated by the elite Special Detective Unit (SDU) of the Garda Síochána, the national police force. The programme was officially established in 1997, following the assassination of journalist Veronica Guerin by a drugs gang she was reporting on. Witnesses in the program are given a new identity, address and armed police protection either in Ireland or abroad (generally in Anglophone countries). They are usually provided with financial assistance, as witnesses regularly must leave their previous employment. Witness protection is used in cases of serious, organised crime and terrorism. The Irish Government will only grant protection to those who cooperate with investigations conducted by the Garda Síochána. Court appearances by witnesses in protection are carried out under the security of the Emergency Response Unit (ERU), the highest-tier special weapons and tactical operations group in Irish law enforcement. There has never been a reported breach of security in which a protectee was harmed.

=== Israel ===
The Israeli Witness Protection Authority, a unit within the Ministry of Public Security is in charge of high-risk witness protection in Israel. The unit was created by law with the passing of the Witness Protection Law, 2008. The need for witness protection raised from the risks and dangers witnesses may face when cooperating with law enforcement. In Israel, witness protection is primarily managed by the Israel Police, with the Witness Protection Authority handling those deemed to be at the highest risk. As trials can last years and Israel is considered to be too small a country in which to safely hide prominent witnesses, the Witness Protection Authority provides security to witnesses and their family members while in Israel during the trial phase and then sends them overseas to a country which has signed a state witness exchange agreement with Israel after providing them with new identities, assistance in changing appearances, language training, and other resources and skills for their new life abroad. Once the relocation has been completed, the Witness Protection Authority continues to manage contact between those relocated and family members in Israel to ensure that they cannot be traced.

=== Italy ===
The witness protection program in Italy was officially established in 1991, managed by the Central Protection Department (Servizio centrale di protezione) of the Polizia di Stato. Previously, witnesses were usually protected in exceptional cases by the police, but this often proved insufficient. In particular the witness protection program was focused on protecting the so-called pentiti, former members of criminal or terrorist organizations who, breaking the code of silence, decided to cooperate with the authorities.

During the 1980s, at the Maxi Trial against Cosa Nostra, informants Tommaso Buscetta and Salvatore Contorno were protected by the FBI due to the lack of a witness protection program in Italy. Although pentiti (usually from politically motivated terrorist organizations) had come forward since the 1970s during the so-called Years of Lead, it was not until the early 1990s that the program was officially established to efficiently manage the stream of pentiti which had defected from the major criminal organizations in Italy at the time, such as Cosa Nostra, the Camorra, the 'Ndrangheta, the Sacra Corona Unita, the Banda della Magliana and several others. Most of the witnesses are given new identities and live under government protection for several years, or sometimes their entire life.

The witness protection program in Italy has sometimes come under criticism for failing to properly protect certain witnesses, as was the case with the murders of high-profile pentiti Claudio Sicilia and Luigi Ilardo.

=== New Zealand ===
The New Zealand Police provide protection for witnesses against members of criminal gangs and serious criminals who feel threatened or intimidated. They run a Witness Protection Programme that monitors the welfare of witnesses and if necessary, helps create new identities. There is an agreement between the police and the Department of Corrections to ensure that protected witnesses receive appropriate protection from that department. In 2007 the programme became the subject of public controversy when a protected witness's previous conviction for drunk driving was withheld from police and he continued driving, eventually killing another motorist in a road accident while drunk.

=== Philippines ===
The Republic Act No. 6981 or the Witness Protection, Security and Benefit Act of 1991 serves as the basis of the Philippines' program. The Department of Justice (DOJ) provides protection for qualified people willing to provide testimony.

=== Switzerland ===
Swiss law provides for a witness protection program coordinated by the witness protection unit of the Federal Office of Police. There is no agency provided, but there are certain circumstances where the police will step up. This is part of their witness protect regime in 2013. There was an outbreak in serious crimes where people didn't want to speak up and that was when the federal government found a loophole in order to find justice.

=== Taiwan ===
The Republic of China promulgated the Witness Protection Act on February 9, 2000, in Taiwan. The act was implemented in order for people to feel comfortable testify against criminal or gangster acts. The prosecutor of judge of the case can appoint witness protection and they are held liable to hold that protective order.

=== Thailand ===
Thailand maintains a witness protection office under the jurisdiction of the country's Ministry of Justice. Between 1996 and 1997 provisions were drafted for inclusion of a section covering witness protection in the kingdom's 16th constitution, and finally, the witness protection provision was included in the constitution and took effect in the middle of 2003. Thailand's Office of Witness Protection maintains a website.

=== Ukraine ===
In Ukraine, depending on the nature of the case and the location of the trial, the safety of witnesses is the responsibility of different agencies, such as the special judicial police unit Gryphon (part of the Ministry of Internal Affairs), the Security Service of Ukraine and, formerly, the special police unit Berkut.

=== United Kingdom ===
The UK has a nationwide witness protection system managed by the UK Protected Persons Service (UKPPS), responsible for the safety of around 3,000 people. The UKPPS is part of the National Crime Agency. The service is delivered regionally by local police forces. Prior to the formation of the UKPPS in 2013, witness protection was solely the responsibility of local police forces. One does not need to be a witness to be granted the protection of UKPPS (for example, targets of "honour-based violence").

=== United States ===
The United States Federal Government operates the United States Federal Witness Protection Program, formal program of witness protection, administered by the United States Department of Justice and run by the United States Marshals Service, under the Organized Crime Control Act of 1970. Before that, witness protection had been instituted under the Ku Klux Klan Act of 1871 to protect people testifying against members of the Ku Klux Klan. Earlier in the 20th century, the Federal Bureau of Investigation also occasionally crafted new identities to protect witnesses.

Many states, including California, Connecticut, Illinois, New York and Texas, as well as Washington, D.C., have their own witness protection programs for crimes not covered by the federal program. The state-run programs provide less extensive protections than the federal program. They also cannot hold or have as many people involved as the federal program.

Before witness protection funds can be sought, law enforcement must conduct an assessment of the threat or potential for danger. This assessment includes an analysis of the resources, intent, and motivations of the person or persons making the threats, and how credible and serious the threats appear to be. When threats are deemed credible and witnesses request law enforcement assistance, witness protection funds can be used to provide assistance to witnesses which helps law enforcement keep witnesses safe and help ensure witnesses appear in court and provide testimony.

Special arrangements, known as S-5 and S-6 visas, also exist to bring key alien witnesses into the US from overseas. T visas may be used to admit into the United States victims of human trafficking willing to assist in prosecuting the traffickers.

== See also ==
- Witness immunity
- Whistleblower protection
