= Quest (general interest magazine) =

Defunct American general-interest magazine

- Editor-in-chief: Robert B. Shnayerson
- Categories: General interest, culture, self-improvement
- Frequency: Bimonthly (initially); 10 issues/year by 1979
- Publisher: Ambassador International Cultural Foundation
- Founded: 1977 (as Quest/77)
- Final issue: 1981
- Company: Ambassador International Cultural Foundation
- Country: United States
- Language: English

Quest was an American general-interest magazine published by the Ambassador International Cultural Foundation (AICF). Founded by Robert B. Shnayerson, the magazine was launched in 1977 as Quest/77; in subsequent years its cover title was updated to Quest/78, Quest/79, Quest/80, and Quest/81. Although it was published by a foundation affiliated with the Worldwide Church of God, Quest was presented as a secular, nonsectarian publication devoted to "human potential" and "the pursuit of excellence".

== History ==
Quest magazine grew out of an AICF publishing project developed in the 1970s under the working title Human Potential. In 1976, after market research and focus-group testing, the title was changed to Quest/77 – the Magazine of Human Potential. Shnayerson, a former editor-in-chief of Harper's Magazine, was recruited to edit the new publication.

By 1978, its circulation base had risen from 175,000 to 300,000.

The magazine's relationship with the Worldwide Church of God drew outside attention because its editorial tone was secular while its sponsoring organization was religious. In January 1981, Shnayerson and five senior staff members resigned after a dispute with church leader Herbert W. Armstrong over whether an Armstrong article on Egyptian president Anwar Sadat's proposed ecumenical center near Mount Sinai would run without editing.

In an April 24, 1981, letter to church members and donors, Armstrong said he had instructed management to "either sell or close out Quest magazine within 90 days" because it had been losing money. The magazine ceased publication later in 1981.
