= Millennium Park (Manhattan) =

Traffic median in Manhattan, New York

Coordinates: 40°42′41.5″N 74°0′29.5″W

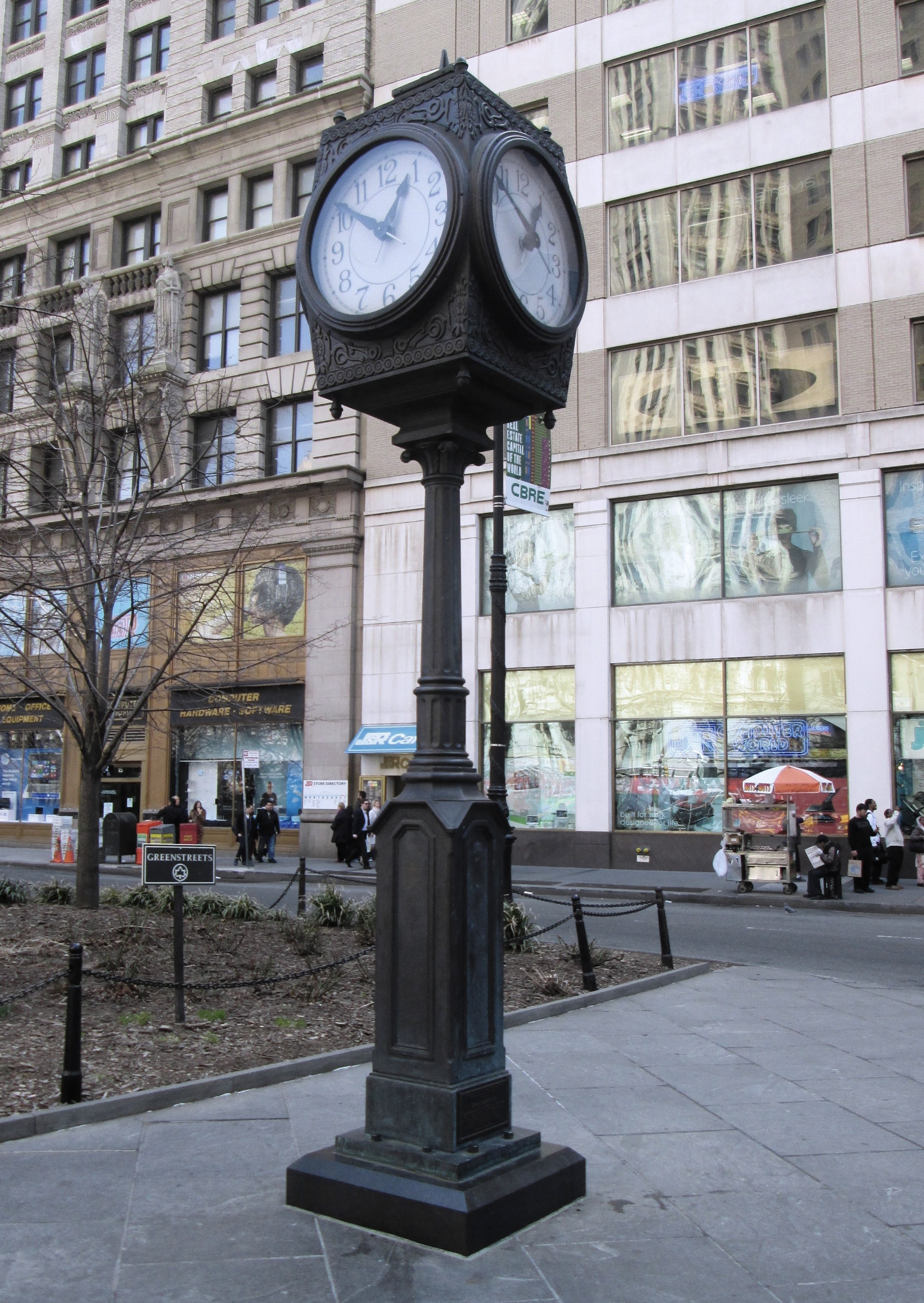
David Rockefeller street clock Broadway and Park Row

Millennium Park is a small plaza located at the intersection of Park Row and Broadway in Financial District of Lower Manhattan, New York City. Located to the south of City Hall Park, it is a Greenstreet site designed to replicate a forest amid a busy intersection. The plaza contains a bus turnaround loop, formerly a paved median transformed into a green space at the turn of the 21st century.

The park was dedicated in November 2000, described by Mayor Rudolph W. Giuliani as “a final gift from the 20th century to New Yorkers of the 21st.” With its completion date in mind, it was named Millennium Park.

At its southern tip is the David Rockefeller Clock, dedicated by the Downtown Alliance in honor of longtime Chase Manhattan Bank executive David Rockefeller. The youngest grandson of John D. Rockefeller, he was instrumental in maintaining the vitality of downtown Manhattan as a business district at a time when many businesses were leaving urban centers for suburban settings. Rockefeller’s contributions to the neighborhood includes the preservation of South Street Seaport, and the construction of World Trade Center and Battery Park City. Keeping in theme with City Hall Park, the 3,500-pound clock was designed in the late 19th-century style to match the fountains and light fixtures of the Victorian period.
