= Park Row (Manhattan) =

Street in Manhattan, New York

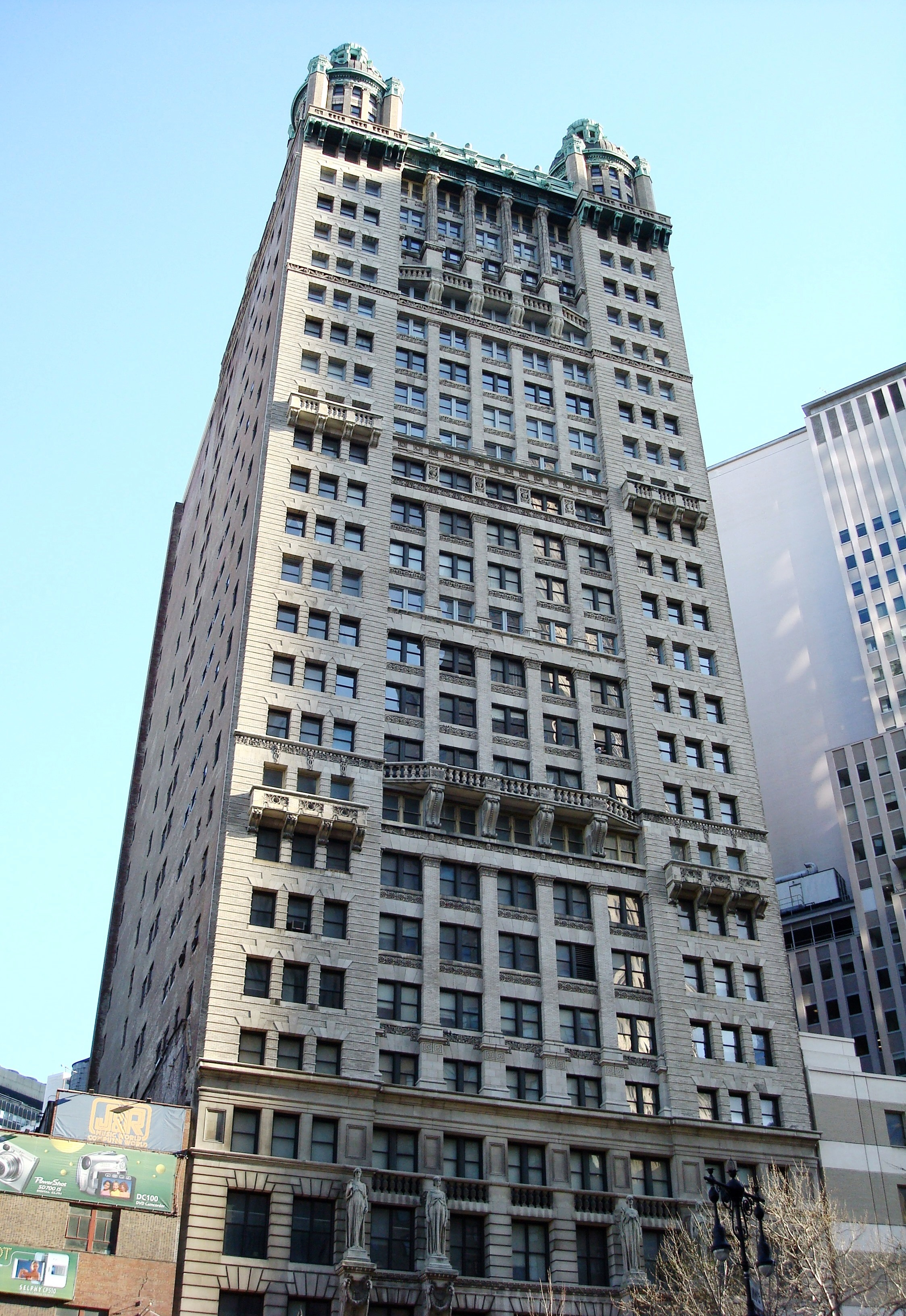
- R. H. Robertson's Park Row Building at 15 Park Row, is a New York City landmark
- Interactive map of Park Row
- Coordinates: 40°42′40″N 74°0′30″W
- West end: Broadway/Vesey Street/Ann Street
- East end: Chatham Square

Park Row is a street located in the Financial District, Civic Center, and Chinatown neighborhoods of the New York City borough of Manhattan. The street runs east–west, sometimes called north–south because the western end bends to the south. At the north end of Park Row is the confluence of Bowery, East Broadway, St. James Place, Oliver Street, Mott Street, and Worth Street at Chatham Square. At the street's south end, Broadway, Vesey Street, Barclay Street, and Ann Street intersect. The intersection includes a bus turnaround loop designated as Millennium Park.

Park Row was once known as Chatham Street; it was renamed Park Row in 1886, a reference to the fact that it faces City Hall Park, the former New York Common.

== History ==
=== 18th century ===
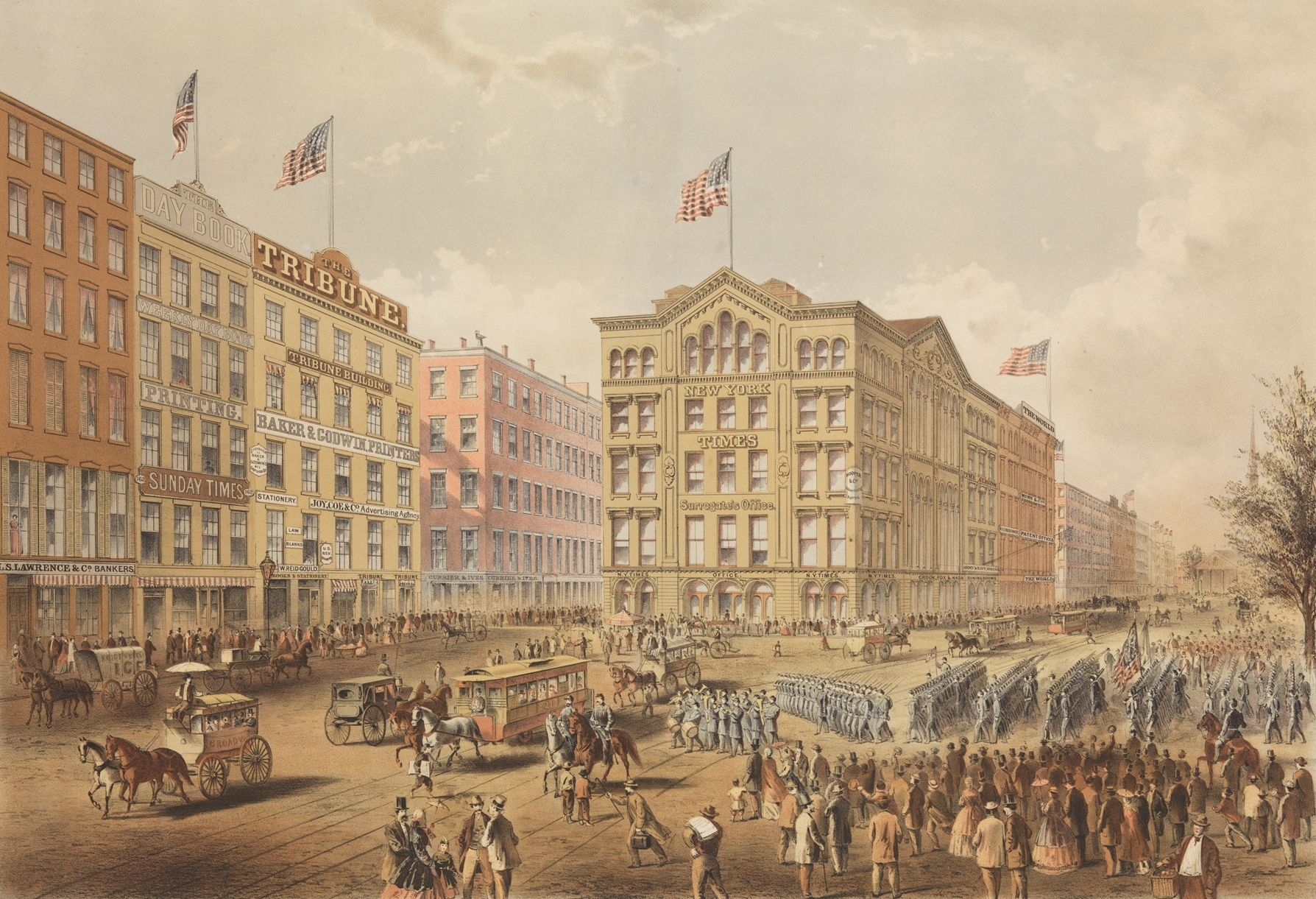
Printing House Square, 1866

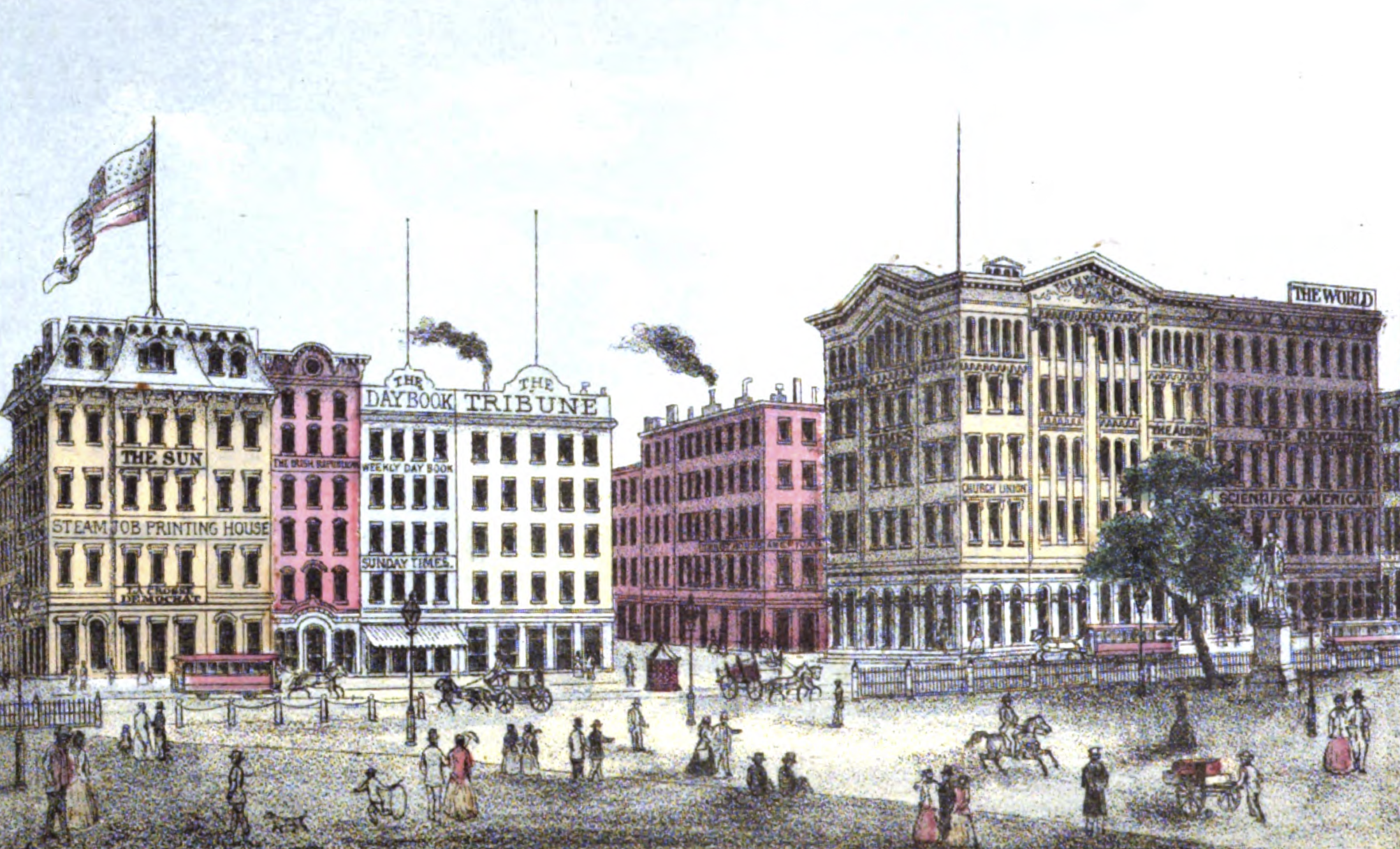
Printing House Square, 1868

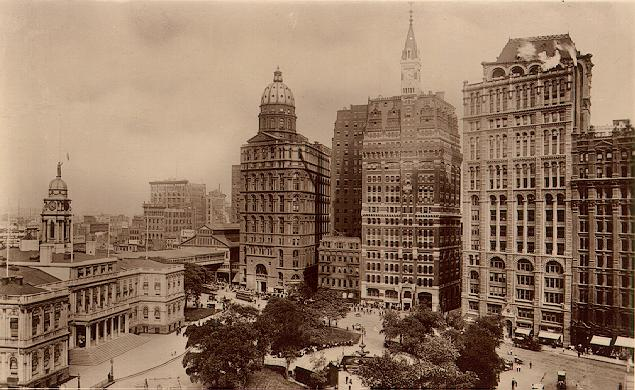
Park Row buildings in the early 20th century (from bottom left clockwise) are: New York City Hall; the New York World Building, also known as the Pulitzer Building (with spherical top) which housed the New York World newspaper and is now the site of one of the Brooklyn Bridge entrance ramps; the New Yorker Staats-Zeitung (later demolished); the New York Tribune Building with the spire top, the present-day site of the Pace Plaza complex of Pace University); the New York Times Building, the 19th century headquarters of The New York Times and currently Pace University building; the American Tract Society Building, visible behind the Times Building; and, cut off from the picture, the Potter Building.

In the late 18th century, Eastern Post Road became the more important road connecting New York City to Albany and New England to its north. This section of the road which became Park Row was called Chatham Street, a name that enters into the city's history on numerous occasions.

The tobacco industry in New York City got its start in 1760, when Pierre Lorillard opened a snuff factory on Chatham Street, and in 1795, the Long Room of Abraham Martling's Tavern on Chatham Street was one of the first headquarters used by the Tammany Society and the Democratic-Republican Party, founded by Thomas Jefferson, on election days. Those who gathered there became known as "Martling Men", "Tammanyites" or "Bucktails", especially during the time that Tammany was attempting to wrest control of the party away from governor De Witt Clinton. In the 1780s, Chatham Street was the site of the Tea Water Pump, a privately owned company which took water from Fresh Water Pond, the city's only supply of fresh water, and which remained purer longer than some of the other sources which drew from the pond.

Chatham Street was also a center for entertainment. In 1798, Marc Isambard Brunel designed the 2,000-seat Park Theater on Chatham Street, intended to attract the upper classes of the city. The theater cost $130,000 to build, and tickets were 25 cents for seats in the gallery, and 50 cents in the orchestra. In the early 1800s, more taverns, theaters and small hotels on the street started to offer free entertainment to attract customers to drink. These were called "free and easies", "varieties" or "vaudeville" and offered numerous different kinds of performances: comedy, dance, dramatic skits, magic, music, ventriloquism, and tellers of tall tales. New theaters such as the Chatham Theater sprang up as well to attract the overflow from the entertainment strip on the Bowery. Boxing was also a popular entertainment. The Arena on Park Row packed in fans with its nightly presentation of "the manly art".

=== 19th century ===
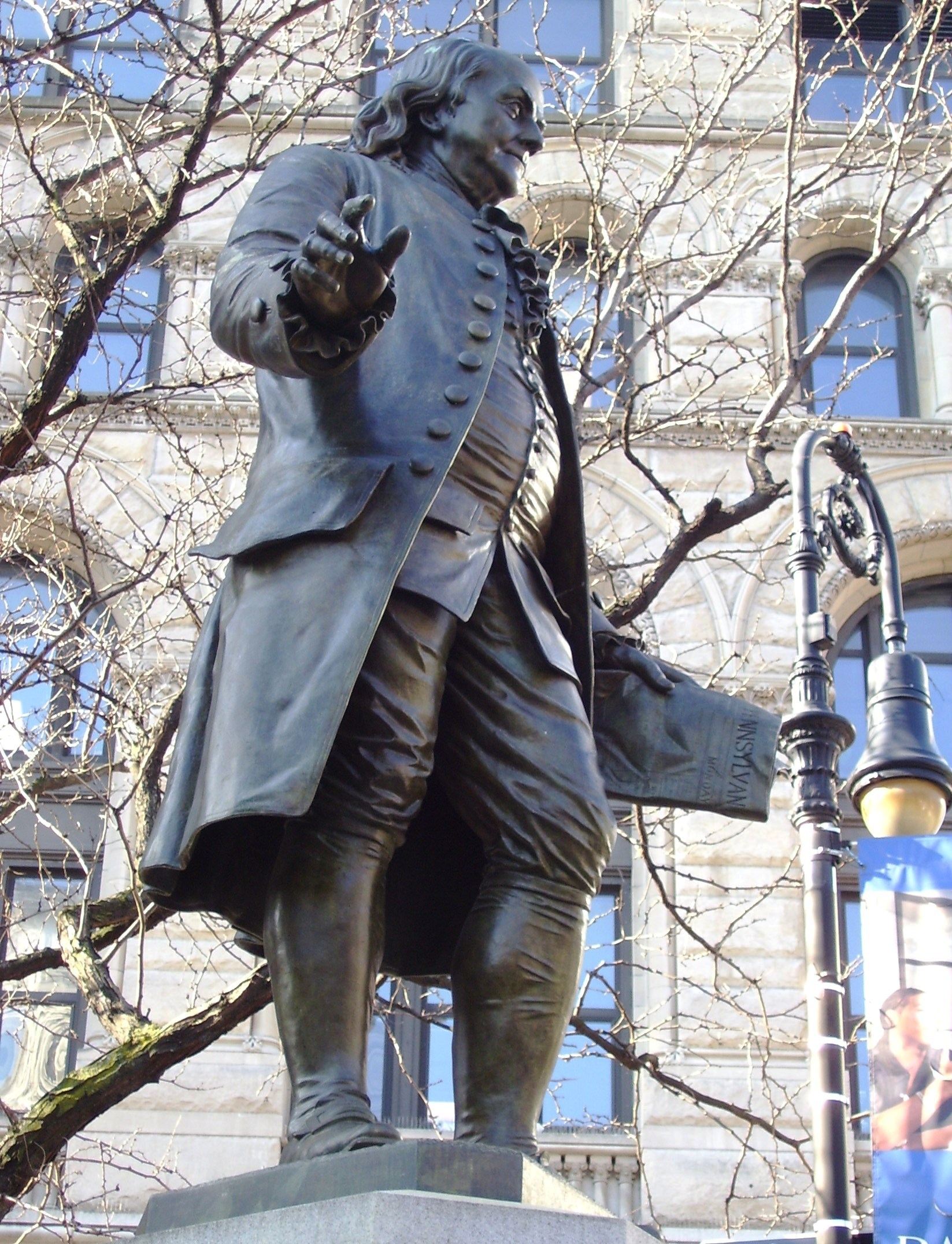
Ernst Plassman's statue of Benjamin Franklin, built in 1872

In the early 19th century, most of the Manhattan portion of the street was suppressed, the Commons became City Hall Park, and the stub of a street was renamed Park Row. By the mid-19th century, the street had a bazaar-like atmosphere from the many used clothing shops and pawnbrokerages open by recently immigrated Jews from Germany and central Europe. This gave rise to anti-Semitic caricatures, although many New Yorkers could not distinguish German Jews from other Germans. Chatham Street was also the site of several anti-African American incidents, as in the 1863 New York City draft riots, during which rioters were repulsed in their attempt to attack black waiters at Crook's Restaurant on the street. Poverty was also commonplace; in 1890, Jacob Riis revealed in How the Other Half Lives that over 9,000 homeless men lodged nightly on Chatham Street and the Bowery, between City Hall and Cooper Union.

==== Newspaper era ====
During the late 19th century, Park Row was nicknamed Newspaper Row, as most of New York City's newspapers located on the street to be close to City Hall. Among the earlier newspapers in the area were The New York Times, which in 1857 became the first New York City newspaper to be housed in a structure built specially for its use. Part of the southern section of the street, centered on the intersection with Spruce Street, was known as Printing House Square. The newspapers housed on Newspaper Row, combined, printed more than 250,000 copies per day at their peak, leading the area to be considered "America's preeminent press center". Other papers, such as the New York Herald and The Sun, were near Newspaper Row but not actually housed on Park Row itself.

The newspapers on Chatham Street were among the first to construct early skyscrapers for their headquarters, reflecting their newfound wealth. The first of these major newspaper buildings, the New York Tribune Building, opened in 1875 as a nine-story, 260-foot (79 m) structure; the headquarters of the New-York Tribune was then the city's second-tallest building after Trinity Church.

After the construction of the Brooklyn Bridge in 1883, Park Row was the site of the large Park Row Terminal for the elevated trains and cable-hauled shuttle cars which crossed the bridge. Service was gradually reduced from 1913 to 1940, and the terminal was demolished in 1944.

The next major structure to open was a new headquarters for The New York Times at 41 Park Row, which was completed in 1889 and stood 13 stories tall. The third early skyscraper on Newspaper Row was the 20-story New York World Building, the New York World's headquarters, which at a height of 309 feet (94 m) was the first building in the city to be taller than Trinity Church. The Times and Tribune Buildings were both expanded in the first decade of the 20th century.

Two other buildings on Park Row were also part of Newspaper Row but not built specifically for newspapers' use. The Potter Building, at 38 Park Row, contained tenants such as The Press, a Republican Party–affiliated penny paper, as well as The New York Observer. The Park Row Building, at 15 Park Row, housed the early headquarters of the Associated Press, founded by Moses Yale Beach.

The Revolution, a newspaper established by women's rights activists Susan B. Anthony and Elizabeth Cady Stanton, was also headquartered on Park Row, at 27 Chatham Street.

The decline of Park Row as a newspaper hub began in 1895, when the Herald moved to Herald Square.

=== 20th century ===
Ten years later, in 1905, the Times moved to its new headquarters at One Times Square. The Tribune moved uptown in 1923, while the World shuttered in 1931. The Journal of Commerce, the last remaining newspaper to publish from Park Row, moved from its headquarters in the World Building in 1953.

Until 1971, Park Row continued in a relatively straight path, except for a curved portion around the Brooklyn Bridge's ramps. Between 1971 and 1973, a pedestrian plaza was built as part of 1 Police Plaza, after which Park Row was rerouted underneath the plaza and its intersection with New Chambers Street and Duane Street was eliminated.

Today, a statue of Benjamin Franklin by Ernst Plassman stands in Printing House Square, in front of the One Pace Plaza and 41 Park Row buildings of Pace University, holding a copy of The Pennsylvania Gazette, a reminder of what Park Row once was.

== Structures ==
The New York Times was originally located at 113 Nassau Street in 1851. It moved to 138 Nassau Street in 1854, and in 1858 it moved a little more than one block away to 41 Park Row, possibly making it the first newspaper in New York City housed in a building built specifically for its use. The New York Times Building, which was designed by George B. Post, was designated a New York City landmark in 1999. The building is now used by Pace University.

The New Yorker Staats-Zeitung moved to its own building at 17 Chatham Street at almost the same time as the Times moved into its new building.

The Park Row Building (also known as 15 Park Row) is located at the western end of Park Row, opposite City Hall Park. Designed by noted architect R. H. Robertson, and built in 1896-99, It was designated a city landmark in 1999. At 391 feet (119 m) tall it was the tallest building in the world from 1899 until 1908, when it was surpassed by the Singer Building.

The Potter Building at 38 Park Row (145 Nassau Street) was built in 1882-86 and designated a New York City landmark in 1996. It was built after the owner's previous building on the site burned down. The Potter Building was converted into apartments between 1979 and 1981.

The New York City Police Department is headquartered at 1 Police Plaza located on Park Row, across the street from the Manhattan Municipal Building and Metropolitan Correctional Center.

Two apartment buildings of significance on Park Row are the Chatham Towers at no. 170 and 180, built in 1965 and designed by Kelly & Gruzen, which, according to the AIA Guide to New York City, makes a "strong architectural statement...[which] rouses great admiration and great criticism," and Chatham Green at 185 Park Row, built in 1961 and also designed by Kelly & Gruzen. Kelly & Gruzen was founded in 1936 through the partnership of engineer Hugh A. Kelly (February 8, 1888 – January 31, 1966) and architect Barnett Sumner Gruzen (July 25, 1903- September 27, 1974).

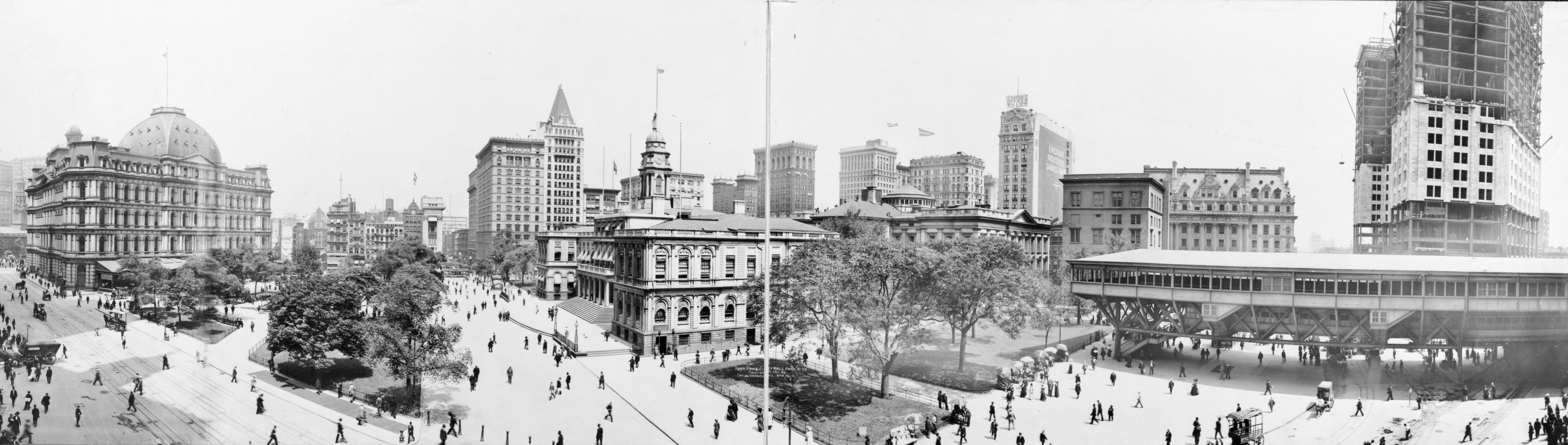
City Hall and Park Row (1911); the Brooklyn Bridge Park Row terminal can be seen at the right

== Police Plaza closure ==
The segment of Park Row between Frankfort Street and Chatham Square is open only to MTA buses and government and emergency vehicles and has been closed to civilian traffic since the September 11, 2001, attacks. The NYPD asserts that this is necessary to protect its headquarters from a truck bomb attack. Nearby Chinatown residents were increasingly frustrated at the disruption caused by the closure of the thoroughfare, arguing that the police department has placed a chokehold on an entire neighborhood and suggesting that One Police Plaza be moved from a residential area. Members of the Civic Center Residents Coalition fought the security perimeter around One Police Plaza for years. Park Row reopened for foot traffic and MTA buses in 2005, although only 200 buses per day were allowed on the street, and they had to pass through security checkpoints.

In 2007, the NYPD stated that it would not be moving despite the numerous complaints from residents, explaining that they had tried to alleviate the impact of the security measures by forbidding officers from parking in nearby public spaces and by reopening a stairway that skirts the headquarters' south side and leads down to street level near the Brooklyn Bridge. The department also planned to redesign its guard booths and security barriers to make them more attractive, and was involved in efforts to convert two lanes of Park Row into a cycling and pedestrian greenway, which opened in June 2018. In the 2020s, the section of Park Row north of Chatham Square remained closed to most traffic, and residents of Chinatown were advocating for it to be reopened. Because of the security barriers, ambulances tended to avoid traveling along the Police Plaza section of Park Row.

== Transportation ==
Park Row is served in its entirety by the M9 and M103 bus routes, while the eastbound M22 runs until Frankfort Street.
