= Chatham Square =

Square in Manhattan, New York

- Nickname: Kimlau Square
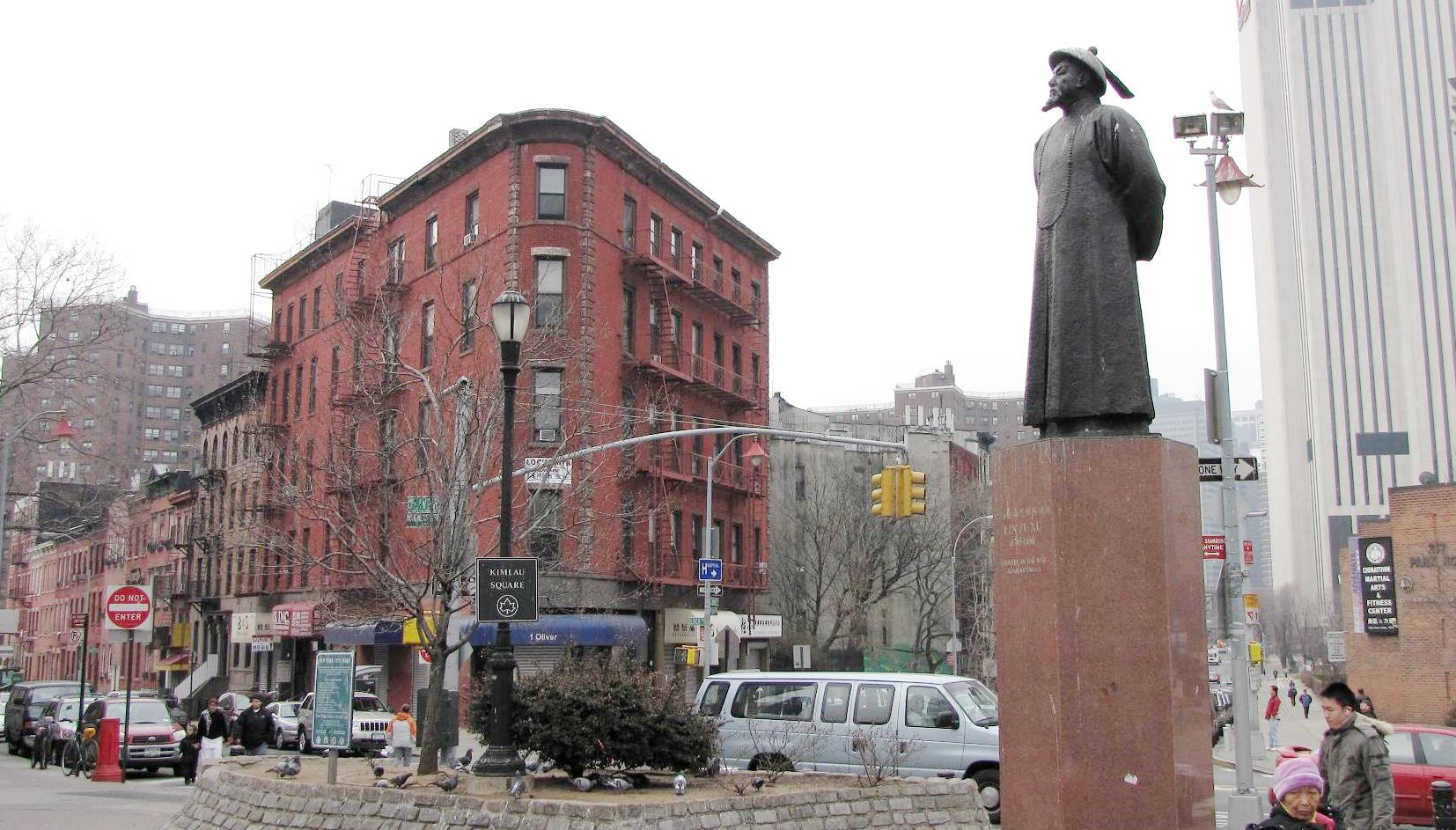
- Kimlau Square, a park located in Chatham Square; on left is Oliver Street; on right is St. James Place; the statue is Lin Zexu
- Location: Manhattan, New York City, NY, United States
- Location within New York City
- Coordinates: 40°42′49″N 73°59′53″W

Chatham Square is a major intersection in Chinatown, Manhattan, New York City. The square lies at the confluence of eight streets: the Bowery, Doyers Street, East Broadway, St. James Place, Mott Street, Oliver Street, Worth Street and Park Row. The small park in the center of the square is known as Kimlau Square and Lin Ze Xu Square.

== History ==
Chatham Square was named for William Pitt, 1st Earl of Chatham and Prime Minister of Great Britain before the American Revolution. Pitt Street on the Lower East Side is also named for him, and Park Row was once Chatham Street.

Until about 1820, the square was an open air market for goods and livestock, mainly horses. By the mid-19th century, it became a center for tattoo parlors, flophouses and saloons, as a seedy section of the old Five Points neighborhood. In the 20th century, after The Great Depression and Prohibition, the area was reformed.

In 2021, the New York state government granted the city $11.5 million to rebuild Kimlau Square, within Chatham Square. Following the state grant, mayor Eric Adams announced a $56 million renovation of Kimlau Square in 2024, which would entail rebuilding plazas and roadways. The next year, the city government published renderings for a redesign of Chatham Square. Under the proposal, the three intersections would be combined into two. The plaza south of the Kimlau War Memorial would be demolished to accommodate the new intersections, and a new plaza would be built north of the memorial.

== Kimlau War Memorial ==
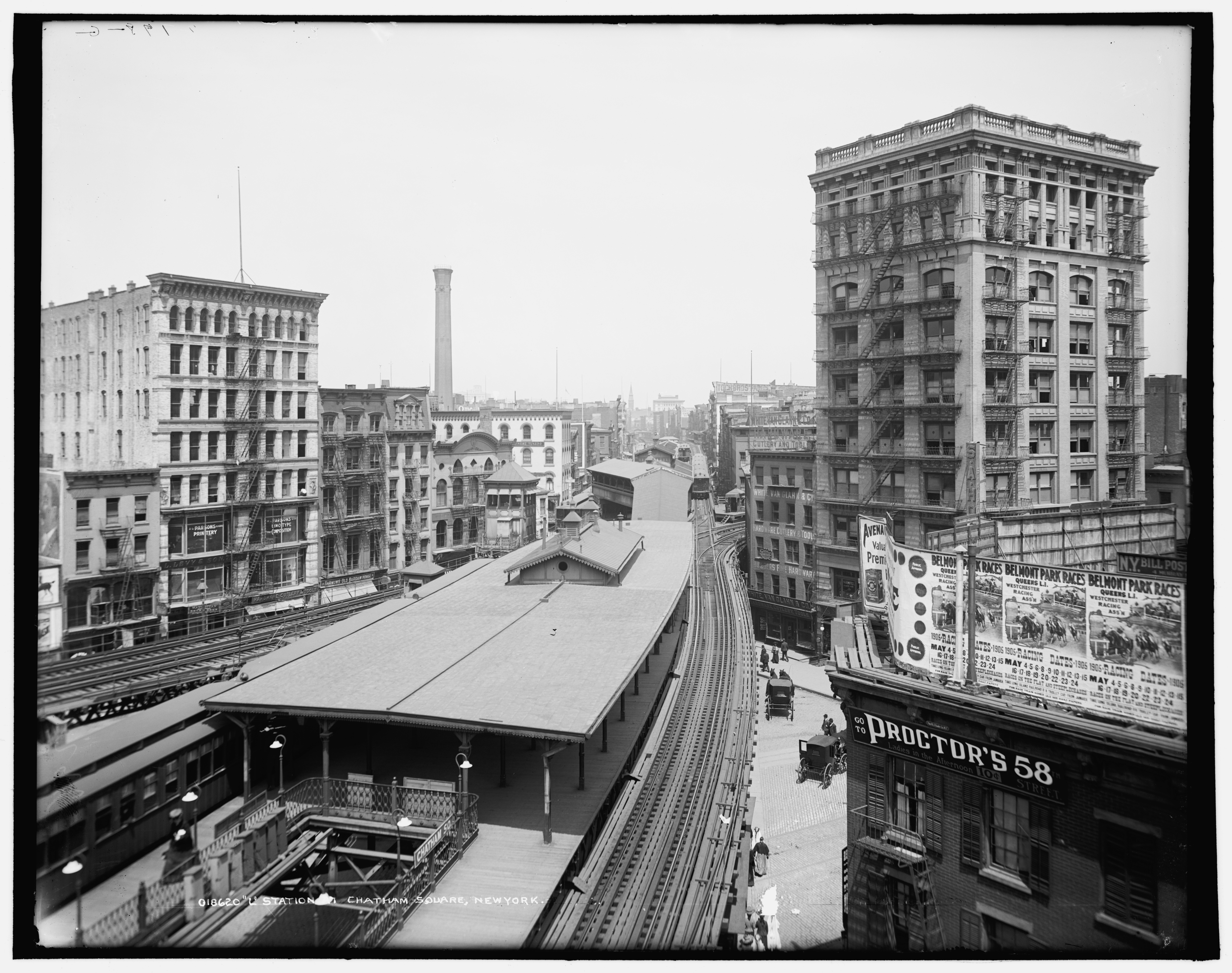
Chatham Square in 1905

The Kimlau War Memorial was erected by the American Legion, Lt. B.R. Kimlau Post 1291 in 1961 to honor United States service members of Chinese ancestry who have fought and died serving their country. The arch is named after 26-year-old 2nd Lt. Benjamin Ralph Kimlau, an aircraft commander in the 380th Bombardment Group who was shot down on a mission over Los Negros Island on March 5, 1944 during World War II. The memorial was designed by Poy Gum Lee and bears calligraphy by calligrapher and poet Yu Youren (于右任). The New York City Landmarks Preservation Commission designated the memorial as a landmark in June 2021.

In the square, there is also a larger-than-life bronze statue sculpted by Li Wei-Si of Qing dynasty official Lin Zexu, who made great efforts to curb the trade of opium in China.

== Transportation ==
Chatham Square was a major station on both the Second Avenue Elevated Line and the Third Avenue Elevated Line of the New York City Subway. These lines respectively closed in 1942 and 1955, in anticipation of being replaced by the Second Avenue Subway, which was postponed repeatedly. Phase 1 of the Second Avenue Subway on the Upper East Side opened in 2017. A new station is proposed for Chatham Square as part of Phase 4, though as of 2016, no timeline or funding has been allocated. The M9, M15, M15 SBS, M22 and M103 routes stop on nearby streets.

== Gallery ==
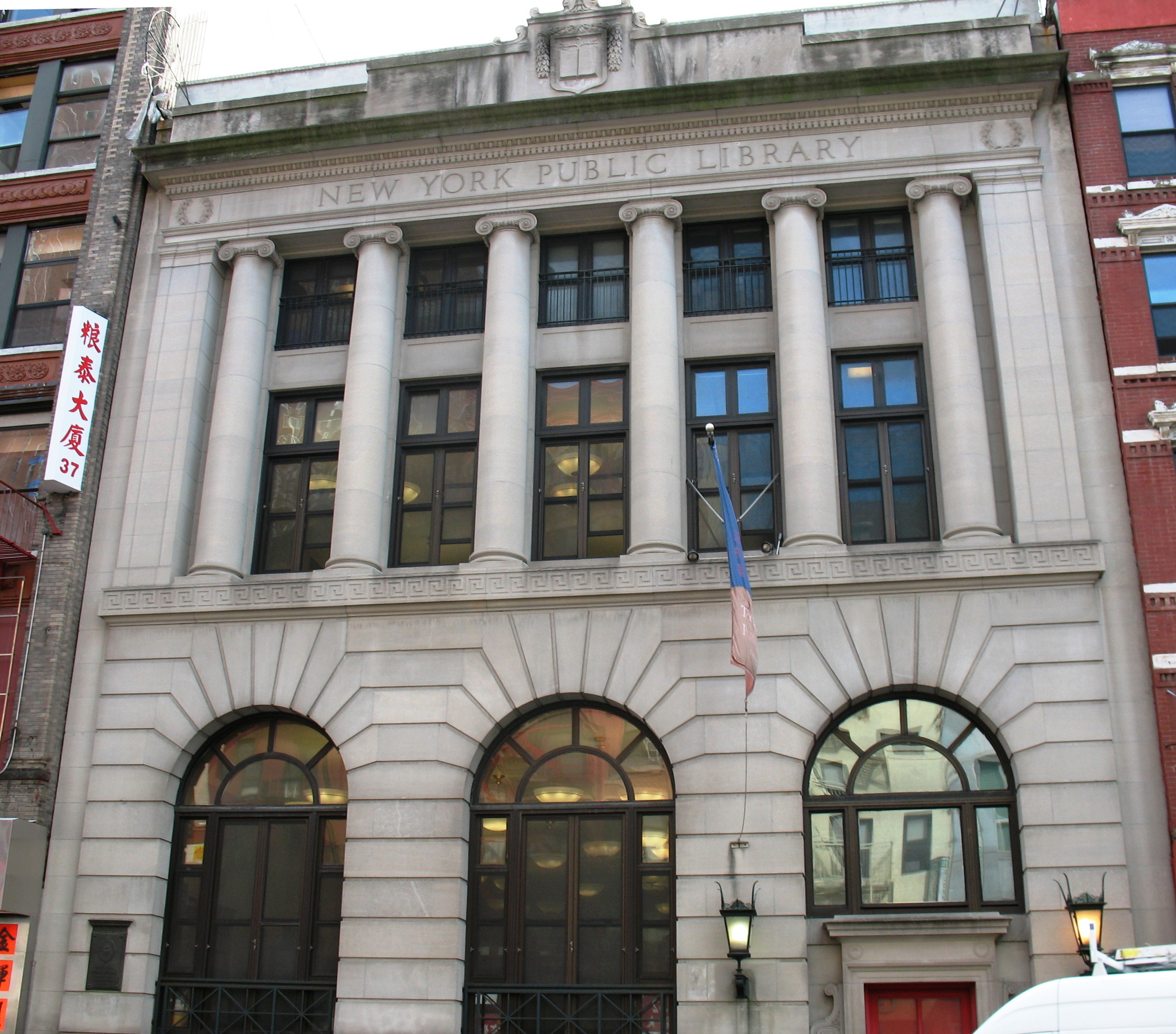
The Chatham Square Branch of the New York Public Library

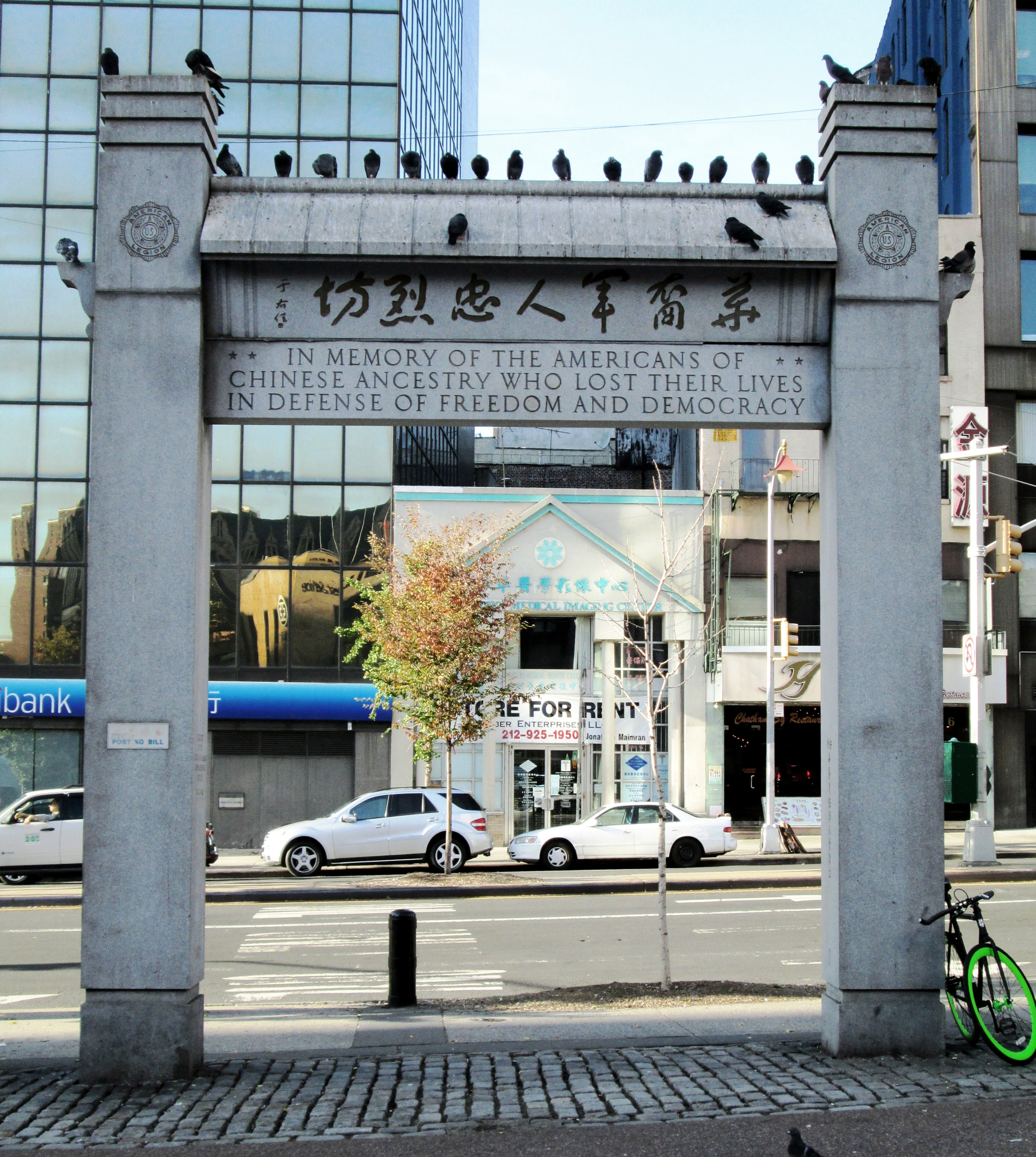
The Kimlau Memorial Arch honors those of Chinese ancestry who fought and died for the United States

Statue of Lin Zexu

== See also ==
- Chatham Square Cemetery
- History of opium in China
- First Opium War
- Qishan
- Yishan
