= Gerald Shur =

American lawyer (1933–2020)

Gerald Shur (October 18, 1933 – August 25, 2020) was an American lawyer, and the founder of the United States Federal Witness Protection Program.

== Biography ==
Gerald Shur was born on October 18, 1933, in the Bronx, New York City, the son of Rose (Nissell) Shur, a homemaker, and, Abraham, general manager of the United Popular Dress Manufacturers Association, an employer group, and later owner of a dress-manufacturing shop.

Shur was educated at DeWitt Clinton High School in the Bronx, and earned a bachelor's degree in business administration at the University of Texas at Austin in 1955, followed by a law degree there in 1957.

Shur died aged 86 on August 25, 2020 at his home in Warminster, Pennsylvania, from lung cancer.
