= Eugene Emond =

Eugene Patrick Emond
- Born: January 11, 1921; New York City
- Died: January 28, 1989 (aged 68); Pittsburgh, Pennsylvania
- Burial place: George Washington Memorial Park, Paramus, NJ
- Military career
- Allegiance: United States
- Branch: United States Army Air Forces
- Service years: 1943-1947
- Unit: 91st Bombardment Group
- Awards: Distinguished Flying Cross; Air Medal with 3 Oak Leaf Clusters; American Theater Ribbon; Victory Ribbon
- Other work: Federal Reserve Bank of New York

Eugene Patrick Emond (January 11, 1921 – January 28, 1989) was an American officer of the Federal Reserve Bank of New York. During World War II, he was one of the youngest Lieutenants (pilot) of the B-17 Flying Fortress Man O War II, Horsepower Ltd. (see nose art below).

== Biography ==
=== Early life and education ===
Eugene Patrick Emond was born to Eugene Edward Emond and Mary McTague in New York City. He was raised in the working-class neighborhood of Washington Heights and attended DeWitt Clinton High School.

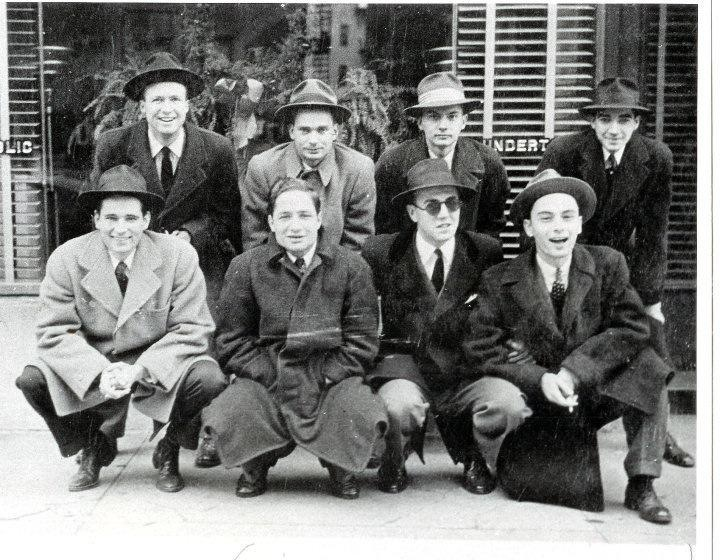
Sheehy Society; standing left to right Dr. Bernard Crowe, Gab Murphy, Eugene Emond, unknown, kneeling: Tom Fitzpatrick, unknown, unknown, Lawrence Emond (pic owned/used by permission by the Emond Family)

=== Military career ===
Emond enlisted in the Army during World War II, where he was trained as a B-17 Flying Fortress pilot. After training he was shipped to England to fly in the 91st Bomb Group at RAF Bassingbourn.

During Emond's first combat mission he flew as a tail gunner in the lead group. He flew as the co-pilot of the next few missions and then as pilot (the left seat) for the rest of his tour. Emond finished his tour around the middle of 1944 and was rotated back home to a base in Florida. When the war ended he elected to stay in the service and was in the Philippines in June 1946. After his allotment of missions, Emond was later offered to become a lead air trainer in Florida. After a short stint training pilots, he decided to return to his job as a "runner" at the New York Federal Reserve.

Emond completed over 34 missions while leading Man O War II. He received the Distinguished Flying Cross and the Air Medal with 3 Oak leaf clusters and logged 1306 hours at the controls. He is considered one of the youngest Lieutenants to pilot a Fortress.

The book entitled "World War II Album Volume 18: Boeing B-17 Flying Fortress" by Ray Merriam states (used by permission) "1st Lt. Eugene Emond Lead Pilot for Man O War II Horsepower Limited was part of D-Day and witnessed one of the first German jets when a Me 262 A-1a flow through his formation over Germany. He was one of the youngest bomber pilots in the US Army Air Forces" (page 24).

Man O War II Horsepower Ltd. B-17G serial number was 42-38083. Man O War II Horsepower Ltd. of the 322nd Bomber Squadron, 91st Bomb Group flew numerous missions with the 91st before being lost in a mission over Merseburg.

Picture of Emond (third from left standing), pic owned/used by permission by the Emond Family and pic on loan to 91stbombgroup.com http://www.91stbombgroup.com/crewphotos/man_o_war_2_crew.html

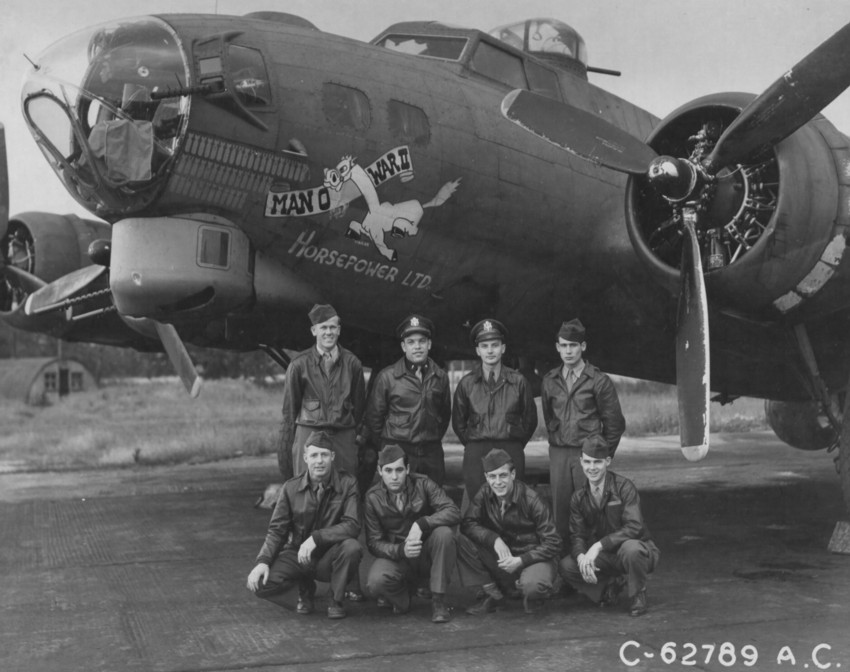
Eugene P. Emond third from left standing
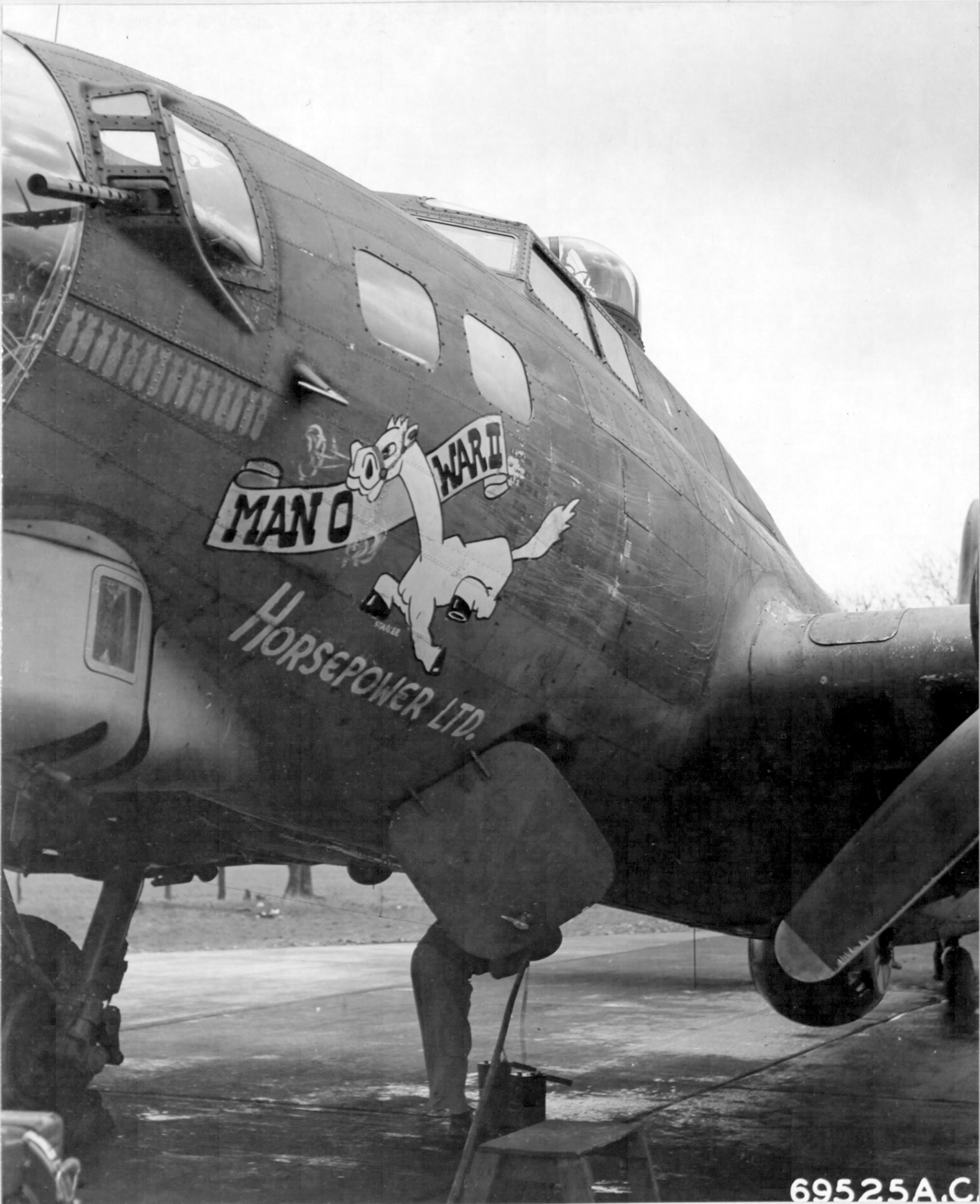
Man O War II Nose Art
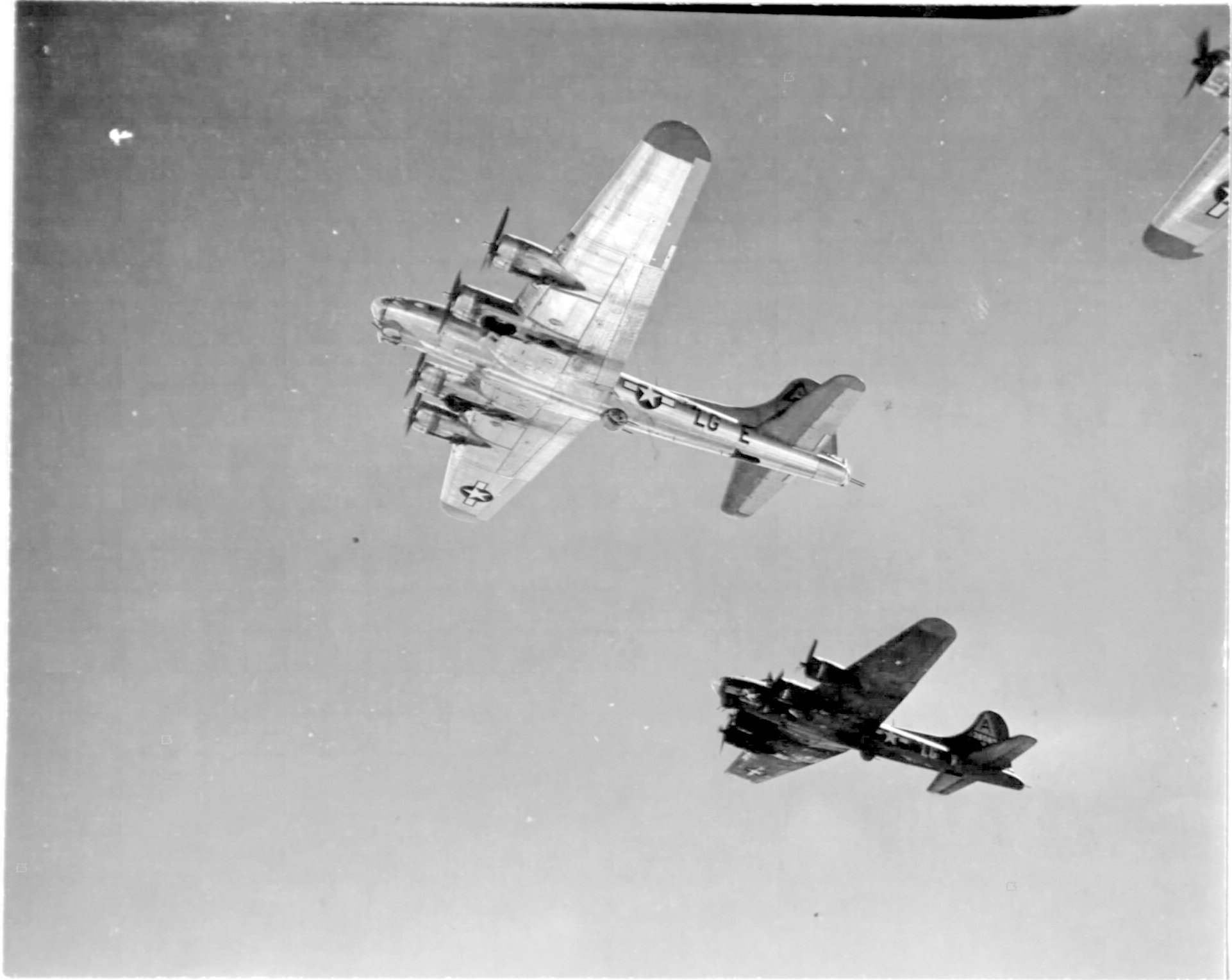
Man O War II inflight

WWII Mission information details
Date	Destination	Duration
5/7/44	Berlin, Germany	9:20
5/8/44	Berlin, Germany	8:35
5/9/44	St. Dizier, France	6:50
5/12/44	Hale, Germany	8:50
5/19/44	Berlin, Germany	10:15
5/22/44	Kiel, Germany	7:55
5/25/44	Nancy, France	7:05
5/27/44	Ludwigshaven, Germany	7:30
5/28/44	Dessau, Germany	8:25
6/2/44	D-Day Special	3:45
6/3/44	Coast of France	3:45
6/5/44	Coast of France	5:30
6/6/44	D-Day Special Mission	5:45
6/8/44	France	6:05
6/11/44	Airfield in France	5:00
6/12/44	Airfield in France	5:20
6/13/44	France	5:55
6/15/44	Bordeaux, France	8:20
6/18/44	Hamburg, Germany	8:35
6/21/44	Berlin, Germany	9:25
6/22/44	France	5:05
6/23/44	Coast of France	4:35
6/24/44	Bridge in France	6:15
6/28/44	France	6:20
7/4/44	Tours, France	6:45
7/6/44	Coast of France	5:35
7/7/44	Leipzig Germany	8:15
7/9/44	Coast of France	4:00

=== Career ===
Emond's career at the Federal Reserve Bank of New York spanned 47 years. The first half of his career was spent as a Bank Examiner traveling throughout New York State. His post Bank Examination positions included being the first Officer in Charge of Operations and Technology, Officer in Charge of the Discount Window, Lead Trainer for Bank Examiners and Senior Officer in Charge of Special Projects. One of the special projects included assisting in the refinancing of the troubled Lockheed Company with investment banks (1970s). Emond was influential in establishing a more formal relationship between the Federal Reserve and the Bank of England. He was also called upon to manage several special projects for the New York board.

One of the projects included assisting in the refinancing of the troubled Lockheed Air with investment banks.

=== Marriage, children and grandchildren ===
Emond married the former Alice Virginia Whalen. The couple had five children together: Eugene Edward, Randall George, Elizabeth Jane, Gary Micheal and Douglas William. After his wife's death in 1972, he raised their two youngest sons on his own. Grand children of Eugene and Alice are Edward Heinrich, Stacy Heinrich Woodin, Julia Heinrich Sanders, Alice Heinrich Clapsaddle, Allyson Emond Kiss, Christopher Emond, Gregory Emond, Catherine Emond Fracassi and Patrick Emond.

=== Death and afterward ===
Eugene Emond died on January 28, 1989, in Pittsburgh, Pennsylvania.

- Grew up during the depression, and he and his buddies would gather at a funeral parlor (common at that time) called Sheehy's
- Brother-in-law was notable surgeon Dr. William Whalen, would later become President of Saint Vincent's Hospital, NYC, NY
- His brother Lawrence (Larry) become Chief Court Clerk for the New York Supreme Court (Bronx)
- Lifelong Yankee fan
- After his death, family members found a letter addressed to Gene from George Shultz (Secretary of the Treasury) thanking him for his work on the Lockheed "bailout"
- Cathy Minihan (ex-president of the Boston Federal Reserve) worked for Gene at the New York Federal Reserve
- He loved music - especially Opera
