= Henry F. Pringle =

American historian and writer (1897–1958)

- Born: August 23, 1897; New York City, US
- Died: April 7, 1958
- Genre: biography, journalism
- Notable works: Theodore Roosevelt: A Biography
- Notable awards: 1932 Pulitzer Prize for Biography or Autobiography

Henry Fowles Pringle (August 23, 1897 – April 7, 1958) was an American historian and writer most famous for his witty but scholarly biography of Theodore Roosevelt which won the Pulitzer prize in 1932, as well as a scholarly biography of William Howard Taft. His work in the field of journalism reached many aspects of public and private life.

== Early life ==
Pringle was born in New York City on August 23, 1897. He stayed in Manhattan throughout his high school education. He attended DeWitt Clinton High School, then located in Hell's Kitchen. Thereafter, he attended Cornell University in Ithaca, New York. He began his career in journalism by working for The Cornell Daily Sun. Pringle joined the United States Army in World War I but too late to be sent to Europe.

== Theodore Roosevelt: A Biography ==
Pringle stayed in New York to begin his career in journalism. He wrote freelance for papers such as the New York Globe, the New York Sun, and the New York World. In 1931, he published Theodore Roosevelt: A Biography. His book was unique in that it did not shy from criticism of Roosevelt and by depicting him with an adolescent judgment:

The Theodore Roosevelt of later years was the most adolescent of men....Failure to receive the Medal of Honor for his exploits [in Cuba] had been a grief as real as any of those which swamp childhood in despair. "You must always remember," wrote Cecil Spring Rice in 1904, "that the President is about six."

The biography provided information that had been avoided in previous accounts of Roosevelt's life (including his autobiography). The book went on to win the Pulitzer Prize in 1932 for biography. In 1956 he published a shortened updated version. In 1939 he published The life and times of William Howard Taft (2 volumes Farrar, Rinehart & Company), authorized by the Taft family.

Pringle's biographer states:

Pringle is best, and most justly, remembered for Theodore Roosevelt. With wit and insight he portrayed Roosevelt as the inimitable Teddy: self-conscious of his place in history, self-confident of his claims to greatness, whimsical, opportunistic, occasionally cruel, and probably sincere. Pringle saw in Roosevelt a figure to notice more than someone to admire.... The biography was a devastating account in some ways, as was to be expected from a writer with muckraking tendencies. In any case, Pringle's verdict on Roosevelt was accepted by the reading public as well as by most professional historians. Indeed, Roosevelt was not seriously challenged for twenty-five years.... Pringle's biography of Taft was a more balanced and thoughtful piece of work than the Roosevelt study. He had unlimited access to the large collection of Taft papers. Moreover, he discovered in Taft a "tortured soul" whose life could best be understood from the inside rather than from the outside. This offered a more serious challenge to the biographer than the chiefly visible exploits of Teddy Roosevelt. Pringle's Taft lacked the excitement of his Roosevelt, but its reputation proved to be no less enduring. By 1940, Pringle was established as a major biographer of twentieth-century public men.

== Personal life ==
Pringle met Helena Huntington Smith in New York and later married her in 1926. In 1919, they had a son named Geoffrey who died in middle age due to severe brain damage. In 1932, their daughter Margot was born, and then their second son Robert in 1936. During World War II, the family moved to Washington, D.C. Pringle never moved back to his hometown. While in D.C., Pringle worked for the Writers Division of the Office of War Information. In 1944, Helena and Henry got divorced. In 1944, he met and married Katharine Douglas.

== Journalism career ==
Pringle was a teacher of journalism at Columbia University from 1932 to 1943. His unique style of teaching involved sending his students out as reporters to learn firsthand. He would then critique their pieces, acting as their editor. Pringle taught here until he moved to Washington. After writing his book, Pringle moved away from writing in Newspapers to writing for various magazines, such as the Saturday Evening Post and the New Yorker. In this way, he supported his family. He would sometimes work with his wife Katharine on articles.

== Liberal views ==
In many senses, Pringle was ahead of his time. Prior to US entry in World War II, he urged intervention on the Allied side. That, like many of Pringle's other views, drew criticism and hate, specifically from pro-Nazi groups. However, Pringle maintained his views. Through writing an article for the Saturday Evening Post on the lack of African-American doctors, Pringle became involved in the issue of inequity towards blacks, which led to lasting friendships with faculty of Howard University.

== Final days ==
Pringle was overtaken by disease later in life. His last work was a history of the Secondary Education Board, which he worked on with Katharine in order to attempt to improve segregated public schools in the American South. It was funded by the Rockefeller Foundation. When Pringle died prior to its completion, the project was finished by one of their staff, rather than Katharine.
