= UK Protected Persons Service =

Service of the UK government

The UK Protected Persons Service (UKPPS) is a service provided by the government of the United Kingdom that provides personal protection to people at risk of serious harm, such as those requiring witness protection or at threat from domestic abuse, honour-based violence, or organised crime.

The service can protect people via actions such as giving people new identities and homes. The service can relocate people within the United Kingdom, but in some instances will relocate people internationally. Protected people who enter the service have access to a psychologist, despite this, being in the service can have a "devastating psychological impact". The service is voluntary, as people must agree to be protected by the service.

The UKPPS was set up in 2013, and is a national service led by the National Crime Agency which had regional units. Police Scotland, Police Service of Northern Ireland and the Metropolitan Police had their own units, but worked in close alignment with the UKPPS. The UKPPS was reorganised in 2019, with regional units coming under centralised control within the National Crime Agency.

The service is also responsible for national standards, co-ordinating across existing services, encouraging knowledge sharing about protection services across police forces and improving local services and accountability.

In 2014, the service provided protection for around 3000 people at a cost of approximately £20 million per year. By 2025, the service was still providing protection for 3000 people. Protection can be removed from people who do not cooperate fully with the service.

Examples of people who have been protected by such services in the UK include witnesses of gun and gang crimes dealt with by Operation Trident and witnesses to the murder of Rhys Jones.

Section 4 of the Serious Organised Crime and Police Act 2005 makes provision for witness protection services.

== See also ==
- United States Federal Witness Protection Program
- Witness Security Programme (Ireland)
