= DeWitt Clinton High School =

Public school in New York City

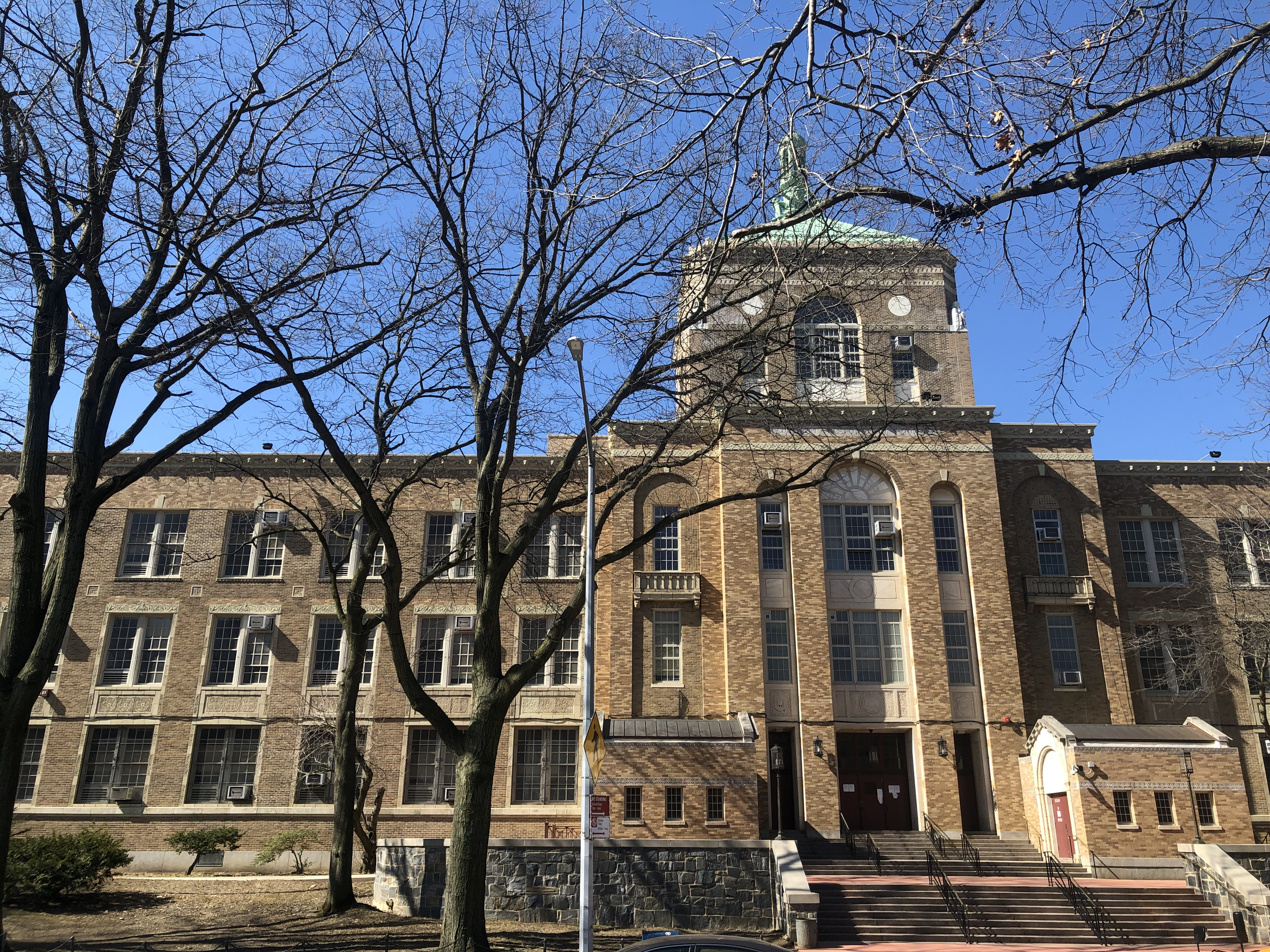

Location
- 100 West Mosholu Parkway South; Bronx, New York 10468; United States; 40.8811°N 73.8865°W

Information
- Type: Public
- Established: 1897; 129 years ago
- School district: New York City Geographic District #10
- NCES School ID: 360008701940
- Principal: Pierre Orbe
- Teaching staff: 80.75 (on an FTE basis)
- Grades: 9-12
- Enrollment: 1,052 (2022–2023)
- Student to teacher ratio: 13.03
- Campus: City: Large
- Colors: Red and Black
- Mascot: Governors
- Newspaper: The Clinton News
- Yearbook: Clintonian
- Website: dewittclintonhs.com

DeWitt Clinton High School is a public high school located since 1929 in the Bronx borough of New York City. Opened in 1897 in Lower Manhattan as an all-boys school, it maintained that status for 86 years before becoming co-ed in 1983. From its original building on West 13th Street in Manhattan, it moved in 1906 to a new location at 59th Street and Tenth Avenue (Haaren Hall at the John Jay College of Criminal Justice). In 1929, the school moved to its home on Mosholu Parkway in the Bronx, which more recently has been across from the Bronx High School of Science. After more than a century of operation, DeWitt Clinton High School since the early 2000s has dealt with serious problems of student performance, gang culture, and security.

== History ==
=== Manhattan history ===
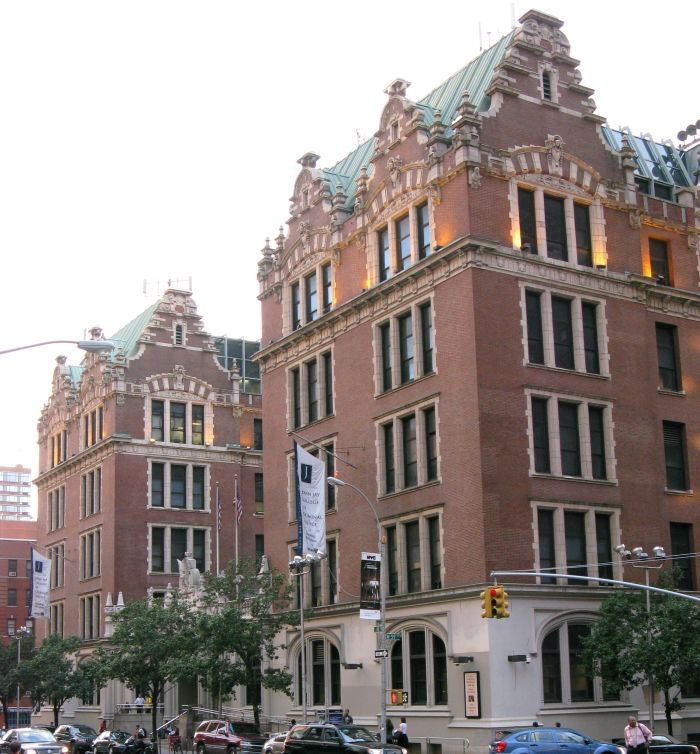
The school's building from 1906 until 1929, now known as Haaren Hall

The school originally opened in 1897 at 60 West 13th Street at the northern end of Greenwich Village under the name of Boys High School, but this should not be confused with the Boys High School that was located in Brooklyn. In 1900, the school was renamed in honor of politician DeWitt Clinton, who had served as a United States senator, as the mayor of New York City and then as the sixth governor of New York during the early 19th century.

In 1906, the school moved to a newly constructed building on Tenth Avenue, between 58th Street and 59th Street, in the Hell's Kitchen neighborhood. That year also saw the opening of the nearby DeWitt Clinton Park, where students farmed plots in the first community garden in New York.

The school's H-shaped building, designed by C. B. J. Snyder, was said to be the largest high school building then in the United States. After the school moved to the Bronx in 1929, this building became Haaren High School. It is now known as Haaren Hall on the campus of the John Jay College of Criminal Justice.

Until high school education became compulsory in the early 1930s, Clinton – like all other public schools in the city – had a classics department where Ancient Greek and Latin were taught. Perhaps its most famous educator was Dr. Irwin Guernsey, a history teacher known to generations of students as "Doc" Guernsey. He came to Clinton in the fall of 1914 and retired in the spring of 1959, due to illness. Using two "Irish" canes, he taught from his chair and won the title of Master Teacher in New York City twice in his career. He was also head of the Honors Association, Arista. The History wing is named "Guernsey Hall" in his memory, and one can still see the library cart named "Doc's Special" on which he sat while students wheeled him to class during the last years of his tenure, when he was sick.

=== The Bronx history ===
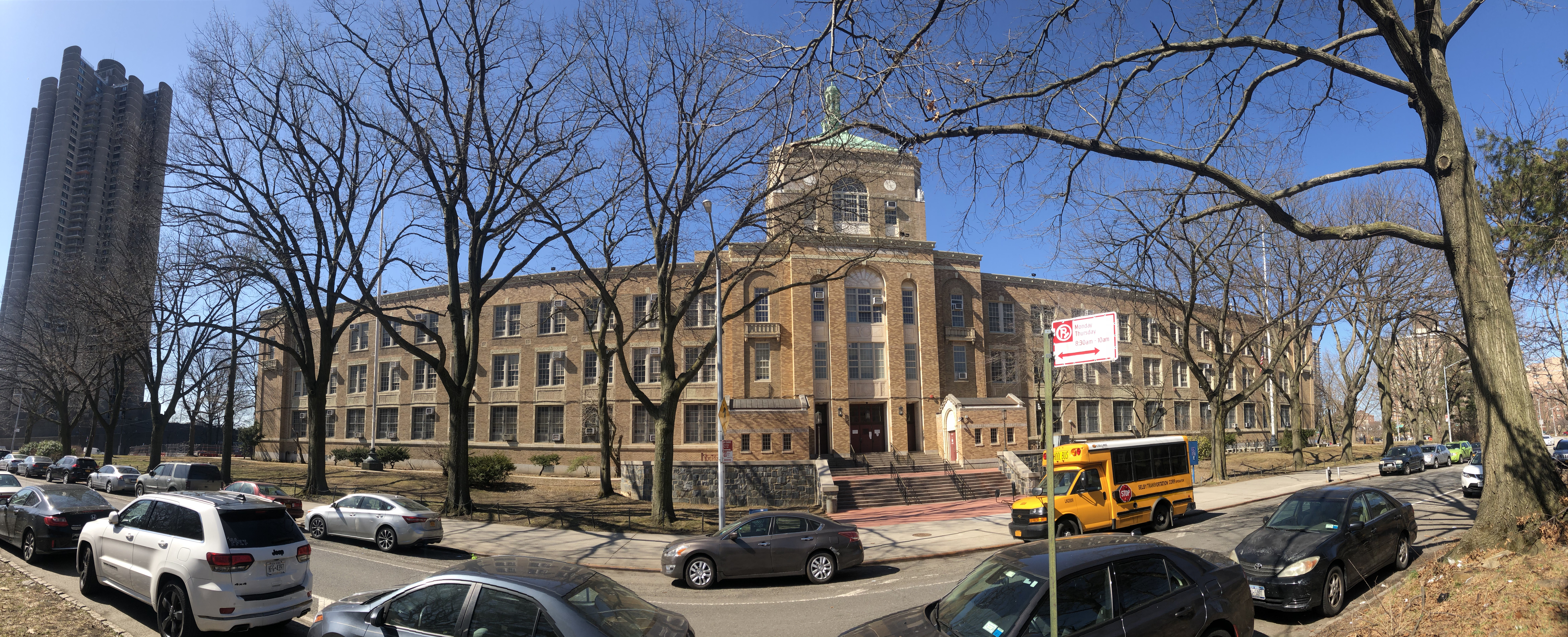
Panoramic view of the school in 2021

In 1929, the school moved to a new building on a 21-acre (85,000 m^{2}) campus at 100 West Mosholu Parkway South and East 205th Street in the Bedford Park section of the Bronx, where it has remained. Paul Avenue, which runs to the side of the school from Mosholu Parkway to Lehman College, is named after a DeWitt Clinton High School principal, Dr. Paul. It was under this principal that the school moved to its location in the Bronx.

During the 1930s, its enrollment peaked at 12,000, and it was said to be the largest high school in the world. Enrollment by 1999 was about 4,000. In 2021, the New York City Department of Education reported 1,118 students.

It remained the last gender-segregated public school in New York City until 1983.

In 1996, Clinton was selected by Redbook magazine as one of the five most improved schools in America. In 1999, U.S. News & World Report designated Clinton as one of 96 outstanding schools in America.

In 1999, Geraldine Ambrosio became the first woman to hold the principal's post at the school.

The school qualifies for government aid because of the low income status of its students. As of 2006, the school had a large Hispanic population, followed by African-Americans, Asians, non-Hispanic Whites.

Clinton received poor evaluations from the New York City Department of Education in its 2010–11 Progress Report. It received a grade of F (39.4 out of 100) with the worst marks in school environment and closing the achievement gap. The Quality Report for the academic year 2011-12 rated the school as "underdeveloped", its lowest rating. It particularly faulted the school for failing to design "engaging, rigorous and coherent curricula" and for failing to ensure that teaching was "aligned to the curriculum, engaging, and differentiated to enable all students to produce meaningful work products." In 2013, to address these issues, the city's Department of Education tapped Santiago Taveras, one of its former deputy chancellors, as the school's principal to replace the retiring Ambrosio. In November 2016, after Department of Education investigators found evidence of grade tampering, Taveras was removed as principal.

== Organization-houses and small learning communities ==
Clinton is split into several small learning communities. They include the Macy Honors Gifted Program (internally often called the Macy House), Health Professions, Veterinary Professions, Public Service, Business Enterprise, Future Educators, Academy House, and Varsity House.

The Macy Program, begun in 1985 with funding from the Macy Foundation, attracts intelligent, hard-working children and prepares them for exceptionally selective colleges. The Macy program has been expanded to serve 1,200 students. The Macy Honors Gifted Program in the Sciences and Humanities has its own teachers, and a nine-period day compared to the regular New York City eight-period day. The program offers Specialized and Advanced Technology (SMT) courses, Science, Math, English, Law, Government, Philosophy and Great Books. All students in the program are required to have a minimum average of 80 and not to fail any courses. When Macy students are removed from the program, they are placed in Excel, a special program just for kick-outs and drop-outs, before being demoted to lower programs. From at least 1998 to 2002, some students went directly into the Excel program.

Advanced Macy students are invited to join the even more selective Einstein Program, which has about 50 students in each grade. This program has even more rigorous academic performance requirements. Einstein students in their junior year are required to take a College Now course for philosophy and government science, in their first and second semester, respectively. These courses allow students to earn college credits. Einstein students are automatically assigned to honors and AP classes as early as freshman year, followed by the mandatory AP United States History and AP English Language for Einstein students who make it to their junior year.

Many Macy students are invited to MASTERS, a month-long summer program that offers many hands-on college courses emphasizing mathematics and science. These include Forensic Science, Robotics, Anatomy, Business, Consumer Chemistry and Electricity.

== Student organizations ==
The school has over 40 academic and interest clubs.

The Clinton News, the school's newspaper, is written and managed by its students. However, like many other outstanding Clinton possessions, The Clinton News publishes several multi-page full color papers a year by a grant from the Christian A. Johnson Endeavour Foundation.

Another Clinton High School publication is The Magpie. Published yearly, the historic color edition of this magazine came out May 2007. This literary collection received the most attention for its association with the Harlem Renaissance.

== Sports ==
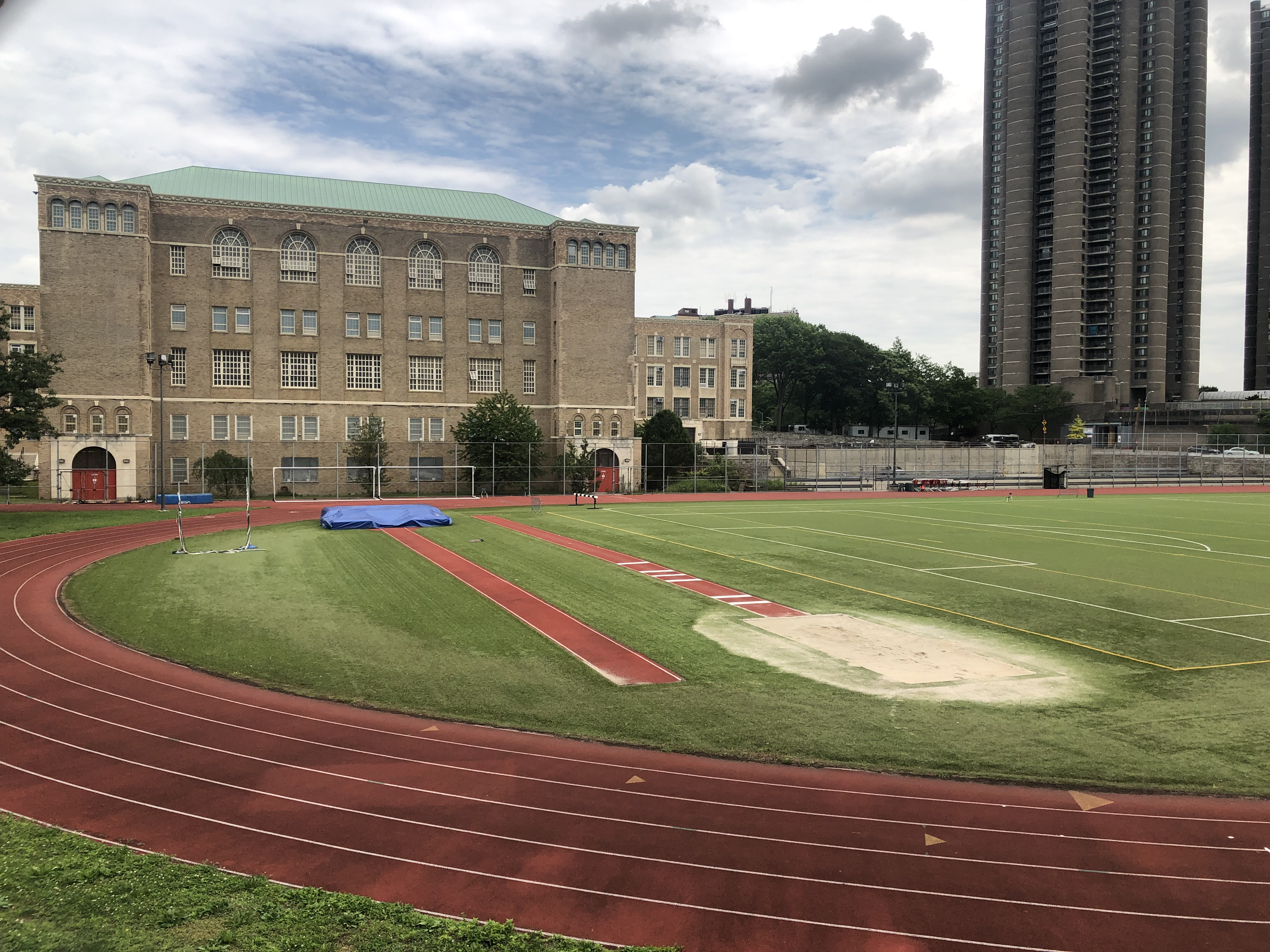
DeWitt Clinton High School athletic field

DeWitt Clinton teams are known as the Governors; there are approximately 35 teams. Some teams no longer exist, such as fencing and rifle. Teams for the 2007–2008 school year included:

- Baseball: boys' varsity, boys' JV
- Basketball: boys' varsity, boys' JV, girls' varsity, girls' JV
- Bowling: boys' varsity, girls' varsity
- Cricket: co-ed
- Cross country: boys' varsity, girls' varsity
- Football: boys' varsity, boys' JV
- Golf: girls' varsity
- Gymnastics: boys' varsity, girls' varsity
- Handball: girls' varsity
- Indoor track: boys' varsity, girls' varsity
- Outdoor track: boys' varsity, girls' varsity
- Soccer: boys' varsity, girls' varsity
- Softball: girls' varsity, girls' JV
- Step: girls
- Swimming: boys' varsity, girls' varsity
- Tennis: boys' varsity, girls' varsity
- Volleyball: boys' varsity, girls' varsity
- Wrestling: boys' varsity girls' varsity

The cricket team's formation was encouraged by the large number of South Asians.

== School facilities ==
DeWitt Clinton High School is located at 100 West Mosholu Parkway South. It dominates the entire block, excluding the ground at the south where the Bronx High School of Science is situated. Facing the main entrance of the building, Paul Avenue runs to the east and Goulden Avenue to the west. The school faces Mosholu Parkway, and has its turf field and track behind it, followed by the softball field, and then the school's baseball and grass football field, Alumni Field. It is after this point that DeWitt Clinton's territory ends, meeting that of Bronx Science.

Clinton has a small branch of Montefiore Medical Clinic within it, capable of supplying essential services to the students of the campus.

The ceiling of a hallway had a 1930s mural by Alfred Floegel called "Constellations", a part of the Federal Art Project. In 2018 the mural was painted over accidentally as part of a roof repair.

== In the media ==
The institution was featured in A Walk Through The Bronx with David Hartman and historian Barry Lewis. In it, Hartman and Lewis take a peek at the library.

The DeWitt Clinton Chorus performed songs in the 2000 production, Finding Forrester.

A book has been written about the school: Pelisson, Gerard J., and James A. Garvey III (2009). The Castle on the Parkway: The Story of New York City's DeWitt Clinton High School and Its Extraordinary Influence on American Life. Hutch Press. ISBN 978-1-883269-30-2.

Clintonites made headlines and New York City School history in September 2005, when they walked out. The 1,500 strong walk out was a result of the installation of metal detectors.

== Alumni ==
=== A–G ===
- Don Adams (1923–2005), actor, best known for his work in the TV series Get Smart
- Lincoln Alexander (1922–2012), Lieutenant Governor of Ontario and first black Canadian Member of Parliament. William Roth Medal Recipient
- Charles Alston (1907–1977), artist, muralist (class of 1925)
- Robert Altman (1944–2021), photographer (class of 1961)
- Frank Aranow (1883–1971), lawyer and politician
- Allan Arbus (1918–2013), actor (class of 1933)
- Nate Archibald (born 1948), Hall of Fame basketball player (class of 1966)
- Ben Auerbach (1919–1993), professional basketball player
- Richard Avedon (1923–2004), photographer (class of 1941)
- William Axt (1888–1959), film composer, The Thin Man (1935) (class of 1905)
- Sanjay Ayre (born 1980), runner (including silver medal at the 2000 Sydney Olympics in the 4 × 400 meters relay) (class of 1999)
- Harold Baer (1905–1987), Justice, New York State Supreme Court (class of 1923)
- James Baldwin (1924–1987), writer (class of 1942)
- Martin Balsam (1919–1996), actor (class of 1938)
- Romare Bearden (1911–1988), artist (1925–1928)
- David Begelman (1921–1995), President of Columbia Pictures (class of 1938)
- Elliott V. Bell (1902–1983), former editor and publisher of BusinessWeek, Superintendent of Banks for the State of New York under Thomas E. Dewey
- Lou Bender (1910–2009), pioneer player with the Columbia Lions and in early pro basketball; later a successful trial attorney
- Ira Berlin (1941–2018), historian, author (class of 1959)
- Pandro S. Berman (1905–1996), film producer (class of 1923)
- Edward Bernays (1891–1995), "father of public relations" (class of 1908)
- Robert Blackburn (1920–2003), artist
- A Boogie wit da Hoodie (born 1995), artist, rapper
- Pedro Borbón Jr. (born 1967), professional baseball pitcher (class of 1985)
- Robert Butler, M.D. (1927–2010), winner of the Pulitzer Prize for General Nonfiction in 1976 (class of 1944)
- Ron Canada, actor (class of 1966) winner of Emmy 1977, A.P.Broadcasters Award 1978, IMDb https://www.imdb.com/name/nm0133474/?ref_=nmmi_mi_nm
- B. Gerald Cantor (1916–1996), founder of Cantor Fitzgerald (class of 1934)
- Richard Carmona (born 1949), former Surgeon General of the United States, dropped out at age 16
- Al Casey (1915–2005), jazz guitarist (class of 1931)
- Gilbert Cates (1934–2011), producer of Academy Award telecasts (class of 1951)
- Paddy Chayefsky (1923–1981), screenwriter (class of 1939)
- Richard Condon (1915–1996), author, The Manchurian Candidate, Prizzi's Honor (class of 1933)
- Avery Corman (born 1935), author, Kramer vs. Kramer, Oh, God! (class of 1952)
- Ricardo Cortez (1900–1977), guest at the Dean Martin Comedy Hour roasting Don Rickles (Man Of The Week), 8 February 1974
- Frank Corsaro (1924–2017), stage and opera director (class of 1942)
- Salvatore A. Cotillo (1886–1939), Italian-born New York lawyer and politician; first Italian-American to serve in both houses of the New York State Legislature and the first to serve as Justice of the New York State Supreme Court
- Ellis Cousens (born 1935), Executive VP and CFO of John Wiley & Sons (class of 1970)
- Milton Cross (1897–1975), Metropolitan Opera radio broadcasts announcer (class of 1915)
- George Cukor (1899–1983), film director (class of 1917)
- Countee Cullen (born Countee LeRoy Porter, 1903–1946), poet (class of 1922)
- Lloyd Cutler (1917–2005) attorney, counsel to US presidents (class of 1932)
- Pedro de Cordoba (1881–1950), actor (class of 1900)
- Paul Dedewo (born 1991), Nigerian-American sprinter
- Charles DeLisi (born 1941), scientist, "often hailed as the father of the human genome project" (class of 1959)
- Peter De Rose (1896–1953), composer (class of 1917)
- Dean Dixon (1915–1976), first black conductor of the New York Philharmonic (class of 1932)
- DJ Red Alert (born 1956), impresario (class of 1974)
- George Duvivier (1920–1985), bass player (class of 1937)
- Fred Ebb, lyricist (class of 1944)
- Will Eisner, "father of the modern graphic novel" (class of 1936)
- Eliot Elisofon, photographer (class of 1929)
- Eugene Emond, World War II B-17 pilot and Officer of the New York Federal Reserve (class of 1928)
- Edward S. Feldman, film producer, Witness, The Truman Show (class of 1944)
- Herbert Fields, playwright and screenwriter (class of 1916)
- Joseph Fields, playwright and screenwriter (class of 1913)
- Bill Finger, author, co-creator of Batman (class of 1933)
- Avery Fisher, electronics pioneer (class of 1924)
- Bernie Fliegel, early professional basketball player (class of 1934)
- Bruce Jay Friedman (born 1930), novelist, playwright and screenwriter
- Ace Frehley, Kiss co-founder and lead guitarist (did not graduate)
- Budd Friedman, IMPROV founder (class of 1951)
- Julius J. Gans, lawyer, politician, and judge
- Frank D. Gilroy, Pulitzer Prize playwright (class of 1943)
- Jacob Goldstein (1891–1920), lawyer and politician (class of 1907)
- Leo Gottlieb, New York Knicks basketball player (class of 1938)
- George Graff Jr., (1886–1973), songwriter, "When Irish Eyes Are Smiling" (class of 1903)
- Bill Graham (1931–1991), rock promoter (class of 1949)
- Luther Green, NBA basketball player
- Adolph Green, lyricist, screenwriter (class of 1932)
- George Gregory Jr., first black All-American college basketball player; New York City official (class of 1927)
- George Gresham, president, 1199 SEIU United Healthcare Workers East (class of 1973)
- Ernest A. Gross (1906–1999), diplomat (class of 1922)
- Sam Gross, cartoonist, New Yorker magazine (class of 1950)
- Gary Gubner, shotputter and weightlifter, Olympic athlete and world record holder (class of 1960)

=== H–M ===
- Jerry Harkness, professional basketball player and civil rights activist (class of 1959)
- Michael Hafftka, artist (class of 1971)
- Arnold Hano (born 1922), writer and editor (class of 1937)
- Hubert Harrison, writer, orator, editor, activist, and "father of Harlem Radicalism"
- Richard Heffner, creator and host of The Open Mind, historian, professor, editor of Democracy in America, and former chairman of the Motion Picture Association of America film rating system
- Tom Henderson, NBA basketball player; Olympic medal winner (silver) in 1972 (class of 1969)
- Bernard Herrmann, composer (class of 1931)
- Judd Hirsch, actor (class of 1952)
- Robert Hofstadter, 1961 Nobel Prize in Physics (class of 1931)
- Irving Howe, author, essayist (class of 1936)
- Percy C. Ifill (1913–1973), architect
- Irving Jaffee, speed skater who won two gold medals at the 1932 Winter Olympics (Class of 1922)
- Leo Kadanoff, physicist, National Medal of Science (class of 1953)
- Bob Kane, co-creator of Batman (class of 1933)
- Ralph Kaplowitz (1919–2009), professional basketball player
- Stanley Kauffmann, New Republic film critic
- Stubby Kaye, actor (class of 1936)
- Theodore W. Kheel, former New York Labor mediator, civil rights activist, entrepreneur (class of 1931)
- Benjamin Ralph Kimlau, USAF pilot killed during World War II; square named for him in Chinatown, NYC (class of 1937)
- Robert Klein (born 1942), comedian, actor, author (class of 1958)
- George Kleinsinger, composer, Tubby the Tuba (class of 1930)
- George Kojac, won two gold medals at the 1928 Summer Olympics (class of 1927)
- Kool Keith, hip hop MC, member of Ultramagnetic MCs and a solo artist (class of 1981)
- Stanley Kramer, film producer and director (class of 1930)
- William Kunstler (1919–1995), attorney
- Burt Lancaster (1913–1994), actor (class of 1930)
- Don Lane (1933–2009), entertainer, talk-show host, sportscaster. Once the highest paid person on Australian television. (class of 1952)
- Joseph P. Lash, Pulitzer Prize author and historian (class of 1927)
- Ralph Lauren (born 1939), designer (class of 1957)
- Butch Lee, NBA basketball player (class of 1974)
- Howard V. Lee, Medal of Honor recipient, Vietnam, Marine Corps Officer (class of 1951)
- Stan Lee, (1922–2018) comic book publisher (class of 1939)
- Barry Leibowitz (born 1945), American-Israeli basketball player in the American Basketball Association and the Israeli Basketball Premier League
- Alfred Leslie, artist (class of 1945)
- Seymour Leslie, founder of Pickwick International record company; president of MGM Home Video (class of 1940)
- David Chester Lewis (1884–1975), lawyer, politician, and judge
- Joe E. Lewis, entertainer (class of 1919)
- Robert Q. Lewis, actor, television host (class of 1938)
- Eric Linden, actor (class of 1926)
- Frank Loesser, composer and lyricist; Pulitzer Prize winner for Drama; Tony Award winner (class of 1926)
- Eddie Lopat, New York Yankee pitcher (class of 1935)
- Robert O. Lowery, first black fire commissioner of the FDNY (class of 1934)
- William E. Macaulay, private equity investor, Forbes 400 billionaire, chairman and CEO of natural resources buyout firm First Reserve Corporation
- George Macy, publisher (class of 1917)
- Vito Marcantonio, US Congressman (class of 1921)
- Joseph Moncure March, American poet, screenwriter, and essayist, known for his long narrative poems The Wild Party and The Set-Up.
- Garry Marshall, director, producer, actor (class of 1952)
- Donald McKayle, stage and film choreographer (class of 1947)
- Abel Meeropol, teacher at DWC; lyricist, "Strange Fruit", "The House I Live In" (class of 1921)
- The Kid Mero, media personality, Viceland (class of 2001)
- Hal Miller, actor, Sesame Street, Law & Order; singer; lyricist; poet; painter
- Paul Milstein, real estate developer, philanthropist
- Walter Mirisch, film producer (class of 1938)
- Tracy Morgan comedian, also attended Clinton and with the approval of the New York City Department of Education, Morgan was awarded an honorary diploma in 2003.
- Jerome Moross, film composer, The Big Country (class of 1929)
- Howard Morris, actor (class of 1936)
- Ralph Morse, photographer, developed the camera that went to the moon in 1969 (class of 1935)
- Jerry Moss, co-founder of A & M Records (class of 1953)
- Johnny Most, radio play-by-play announcer for the Boston Celtics basketball team (class of 1940)
- Jan Murray, actor, television host (class of 1934)
- Lou Myers, cartoonist, writer for The New Yorker (class of 1933)

=== N–Z ===
- Andrea Navedo, actress and singer (class of 1988)
- Frank H. Netter M.D., anatomy artist (class of 1923)
- Roy Neuberger, financier (class of 1921)
- Barnett Newman, artist (class of 1923)
- Herbie Nichols, pianist, songwriter, "Lady Sings the Blues"; left at age 15 to attend City College of New York
- John Kenyon Nicholson, playwright, screenwriter Attended 1910–1911
- Barnet Nover, longtime Washington bureau chief for the Denver Post
- Herbert Parmet (1929–2017) (class of 1948), historian and biographer
- Basil Paterson, labor lawyer, political leader in New York (class of 1942)
- Jan Peerce, Metropolitan Opera tenor (class of 1922)
- Abraham Polonsky (1910–1991), blacklisted screenwriter
- Bud Powell, jazz pianist and composer; dropped out at age 15
- Mel Powell, Pulitzer Prize–winning jazz composer (class of 1937)
- Robert Poydasheff, former mayor of Columbus, Georgia
- Henry F. Pringle, winner of the Pulitzer Prize for Biography or Autobiography for his 1931 biography of Theodore Roosevelt (class of 1915)
- Mario Procaccino, New York City Comptroller and politician (class of 1931)
- DeWitt Clinton Ramsey, admiral, US Navy (class of 1908)
- John Randolph, actor (class of 1932)
- Charles Rangel, United States congressman
- Maurice M. Rapport, biochemist who identified the neurotransmitter serotonin (class of 1936)
- Tubby Raskin (1902–1981), basketball player and coach
- Marcus Eli Ravage (1884-1965), journalist and essayist, attended DeWitt Clinton High School in the mid-1900s to qualify for a university stipend.
- Seymour Reit, co-creator, Casper, the Friendly Ghost (class of 1934)
- Sugar Ray Robinson, champion prizefighter (class of 1938)
- Richard Rodgers, Emmy Award, Grammy Award, Academy Award, and Tony Award winner (class of 1919)
- A.M. Rosenthal, The New York Times journalist; 1960 Pulitzer Prize winner for International Reporting (class of 1938)
- Bob Rothberg, songwriter and author (class of 1919)
- William Ruder, co-founder of Ruder-Finn (class of 1938)
- Jack Rudin, real estate developer, philanthropist (class of 1942)
- Lewis Rudin, real estate developer, philanthropist (class of 1944)
- Juan Ramon Sánchez, judge, US District Court PA (class of 1974)
- Dolph Schayes, NBA Hall of Fame basketball player (class of 1945)
- Danny Schechter, journalist, filmmaker, author (class of 1960)
- Daniel Schorr, journalist (class of 1933)
- M. Lincoln Schuster, co-founder of Simon & Schuster publishers (class of 1913)
- Barry Schwartz, co-founder of Calvin Klein (class of 1959)
- Sherwood Schwartz, creator of Gilligan's Island and The Brady Bunch (class of 1934)
- Gil Scott-Heron (1949–2011) musician, poet, and activist. Did not graduate, transferred to The Fieldston School
- Barney Sedran (1891–1964), NBA Hall of Fame basketball player
- Sam Shaw (1912-1999), photographer and film producer.
- Steve Sheppard, played for the Chicago Bulls; won a gold medal at the 1976 Summer Olympics (class of 1973)
- Gerald Shur (1933–2020), founder of the United States Federal Witness Protection Program
- Neil Simon, playwright and screenwriter; recipient of a Pulitzer Prize, various Emmy Awards, Tony Awards, and a Golden Globe (class of 1944)
- Aaron Siskind, abstract photographer (class of 1921)
- Ricky Sobers, professional basketball player (class of 1971)
- Herbert Solomon (1919–2004), statistician
- Jerome S. Spevack (1918–1999) (Class of 1935) Scientist, inventor, chemical engineer, Manhattan Project scientist, Developed most economical method to produce heavy water
- Lionel Jay Stander (1908–1994), actor in films, radio, theater and television
- Louis Stark, The New York Times reporter and Pulitzer Prize winner for Telegraphic Reporting in 1942 (class of 1907)
- Sol Stein (born 1926), author
- David Steinberg (1932–2017), American journalist and president of PR Newswire
- Milton Steinberg (1903–1950), prominent rabbi, philosopher, theologian and author; Valedictorian, class of 1921
- Larry Storch, actor (class of 1941)
- Charles Strouse, composer (class of 1944)
- Howard Taubman (1907–1996), music and theater critic for The New York Times (class of 1925)
- Sammy Timberg, musician and composer (class of 1919)
- Laurence Tisch, head of Loew's Hotels, CBS (class of 1939)
- Doug "The Greaseman" Tracht, radio personality (class of 1968)
- Marvin Traub, former head of Bloomingdale's department store (class of 1942)
- Lionel Trilling (1905–1975), educator and literary critic (class of 1921)
- Ozzie Virgil Sr., The first Dominican to play in Major League Baseball (class of 1950)
- Fats Waller, jazz pianist (did not graduate)
- Ed Warner, college basketball player; central figure on point shaving scandal (class of 1948)
- Ben Wattenberg, host of Think Tank on PBS; author (class of 1951)
- Jerome Weidman, winner of the Pulitzer Prize for Drama (Class of 1930)
- Allen Weinstein, Archivist of the United States (class of 1954)
- Grover Whalen, "Mr. New York", WNYC founder, President of World's Fair Corporation (class of 1906)
- Woodie W. White, bishop of the United Methodist Church (class of 1953)
- Willie Worsley, community leader and basketball player (class of 1964)
- Lester Wunderman, advertising expert, consultant, professor, author, photographer (class of 1936)
- William Zeckendorf, real estate developer (class of 1921)

== Records ==
- DeWitt Clinton High School students organized one of the largest high school walkouts in New York on September 19, 2005. The protest occurred over installation of airport-style metal detectors and X-ray scanners, which had already been installed in many other schools throughout New York City.
