= United States Federal Witness Protection Program =

To protect threatened witnesses before, during, and after a trial

- Administered by: United States Department of Justice
- Codified under: 18 U.S. Code § 3521
- Year established: 1970
- Aim: To protect witnesses and their families from harm
- Operated by: United States Marshals Service
- Amended by: Comprehensive Crime Control Act of 1984
- Authorized by: Organized Crime Control Act of 1970

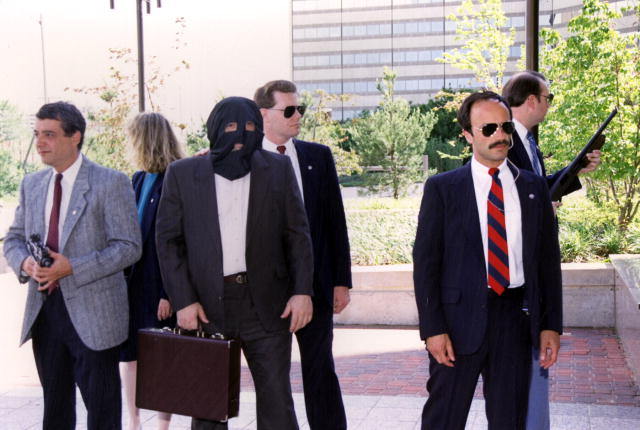
U.S. Marshals practice guarding a protected witness, 1994

The United States Federal Witness Protection Program (WPP), also known as the Witness Security Program or WITSEC, is a witness protection program codified through 18 U.S. Code § 3521 and administered by the United States Department of Justice.

The program is operated by the United States Marshals Service and is designed to protect threatened witnesses and their family members before, during, and after a trial when those witnesses have an association with the federal government.

The program was originally authorized by the Organized Crime Control Act of 1970 and later amended by the Comprehensive Crime Control Act of 1984. The amended issues included bail, sentencing reform, pleas for insanity, and penalties for drug offenses.

== History ==
The WITSEC program was formally established under Title V of the Organized Crime Control Act of 1970, which states that the United States attorney general may provide for the relocation and protection of a witness or potential witness of the federal government or a state government in an official proceeding concerning organized crime or other serious offenses. See 18 U.S.C. 3521, et seq. The Federal government also gives grants to the states to enable them to provide similar services.

The precursor to WITSEC was the Federal Witness Protection Program, created in the mid-1960s by Gerald Shur, the attorney in charge of the Intelligence and Special Services Unit of the Organized Crime and Racketeering Section of the United States Department of Justice.

Most witnesses are protected by the United States Marshals Service under the Department of Justice, while the protection of incarcerated witnesses is the duty of the Federal Bureau of Prisons.

From the WITSEC program, the Emergency Witness Assistance Program was created in 1997 to fill "the need for immediate, non-protective, short-duration witness assistance not available through the Witness Security Program and the Short-Term Protection Program".

== Operations ==
A handful of states—California, Connecticut, Illinois, New York, Texas, and Virginia—and Washington, D.C., have their own witness protection programs for crimes not covered by the federal program. These state-run programs provide less extensive protections, in part because state governments lack the ability to issue federal documents such as Social Security cards to verify the new identity of protected witnesses. Another benefit of the federal program is that the Marshals Service provides payments to participants of about $60,000 on average, while also assisting them with finding housing and stable jobs under their new identities.

There are two main types of witnesses who can be eligible for the program, "fact witnesses" and "expert witnesses." Fact witnesses provide factual information and/or personal knowledge to a case. Often, though not always, these witnesses were present at the scene of a crime. Expert witnesses provide technical or scientific testimony. Both types of witnesses will be compensated based on negotiations with a federal government attorney.

As of 2020, approximately 19,000 witnesses and family members had been protected by the U.S. Marshals Service since the program began in 1971. The program has a 100% success rate; no witness who has followed the rules and guidelines set out by the U.S. Marshals Service has ever died in WITSEC.

According to Gerald Shur, who created the federal program, about 95% of witnesses in the program are "criminals". They may be intentional criminals, or people who are doing business with criminals, such as one engineer who bought off a mayor "'because that's how you do business in the city.' In his mind, he wasn't doing anything criminal," Shur said. A witness who agrees to testify for the prosecution is generally eligible to join the program, which is entirely voluntary. Witnesses are permitted to leave the program and return to their original identities at any time, although this is discouraged by administrators.

In both criminal and civil matters involving protected witnesses, the U.S. Marshals cooperate fully with local law enforcement and court authorities to bring witnesses to justice or to have them fulfill their legal responsibilities.

The program is highly secretive in order to ensure the safety of its participants. The leaking or sharing of information on these participants is taken seriously. A former federal law enforcement officer, John Thomas Ambrose, was convicted in 2009 of leaking information about a federal witness in the Witness Protection Program, to Chicago Outfit hitman Nicholas Calabrese.

== Recidivism ==
Recidivism is described as a person's relapse into the criminal justice system without a new sentence within a three-year period. Fewer than 17% of protected witnesses who have committed crimes are caught committing other crimes. While this is far lower than the national average, notable instances of protected witnesses returning to a life of crime exist, such as Sammy Gravano.

== Emergency Witness Assistance Program ==
The process of entering the Witness Protection Program can be prolonged for numerous reasons. The Emergency Witness Assistance Program, created in 1997, provides services more quickly, but participation is limited to a 30-day period. Its services include housing, transportation, subsistence payments, and child/elder care.

== See also ==
- Hide in Plain Sight
- Witness immunity
- Witness Security Programme
- UK Protected Persons Service (Ireland)
- Witness tampering
- Gerald Shur
