= Benjamin Ralph Kimlau =

United States Army Air Forces officer (1918–1944)

- Born: April 11, 1918; Concord, Massachusetts
- Died: March 5, 1944 (aged 25); Nadzab Air Field, Papua New Guinea
- Burial place: Arlington National Cemetery
- Military career
- Allegiance: United States (United States Army; United States Army Air Forces)
- Service years: 1942–1944
- Rank: 2nd Lieutenant
- Unit: 380th Bombardment Group
- Commands: 530th Squadron
- Conflicts: Second World War: Pacific War; China Defensive Campaign; Northern Solomons Campaign; Bismarck Archipelago Campaign †

Chinese name
- Traditional Chinese: 劉國樑
- Simplified Chinese: 刘国梁
Transcriptions
Standard Mandarin
- Hanyu Pinyin: Liú Guóliáng
Yue: Cantonese
- Yale Romanization: Làuh Gwoklèuhng
- Jyutping: Lau^{4} Gwok^{3} loeng^{4}

Benjamin Ralph Kimlau (金勞少尉) (April 11, 1918 – March 5, 1944) was a Chinese American aviator and United States Army Air Forces bomber pilot.

Kimlau was born on April 10, 1918, in Concord, Massachusetts, and moved to New York City with his parents in 1932 when he was 14 years old. He attended DeWitt Clinton High School. After his visit to China, he studied at Pennsylvania Military College in Chester, Pennsylvania, from 1938 to 1942. Upon graduation he joined the United States Field Artillery Branch as a 2nd lieutenant.

Kimlau soon transferred to the US Army Air Forces' 380th Bombardment Group of the Fifth Air Force. After training as a pilot, he deployed to Fenton Airfield in Australia, from which he flew a B-24 Liberator bomber in 45 missions in support of the New Guinea campaign. On March 5, 1944, Kimlau's bomber crashed shortly after take-off from Nadzab Airfield in New Guinea due to engine failure. Kimlau, his co-pilot, and all 8 members of the crew were killed in the crash. His remains were re-interred at Arlington National Cemetery in 1968.

Kimlau posthumously received the American Campaign Medal, the Asiatic-Pacific Campaign Medal, and the World War II Victory Medal; his bomber group received two Presidential Unit Citations for gallantry in battle.

== Honors ==
In 1962, the Benjamin Ralph Kimlau Memorial Gate (金勞紀念牌坊) was erected at Kimlau Square within Chatham Square in Chinatown to his memory. The New York City Landmarks Preservation Commission designated the Kimlau War Memorial as a landmark in June 2021. In addition, Kimlau has been honored by American Legion 1291, which named its post after him.

== See also ==
- Arthur Chin
- Francis B. Wai
