= Robert B. Shnayerson =

American magazine editor and journalist

Robert Beahan Shnayerson (December 8, 1925 – March 6, 2022) was an American magazine editor and journalist. He worked for The New York Daily News, Life, and Time, served as editor-in-chief of Harper's Magazine from 1971 to 1976, and later founded Quest magazine. He was also the author of The Illustrated History of the Supreme Court of the United States (1986).

== Early life and education ==
Shnayerson was born in New York City on December 8, 1925, to Charles Beahan, a novelist and screenwriter, and Madalene Griffin. He graduated from DeWitt Clinton High School at the outset of World War II and enlisted in the United States Navy, serving as a quartermaster on an oiler in the North Atlantic. After the war, he attended Dartmouth College on the G.I. Bill and graduated in 1950.

== Career ==
Shnayerson began his journalism career as a junior police reporter at The New York Daily News. He later joined Life, where he became the magazine's bureau chief in Seattle, covering the Pacific Northwest, and then moved to Time. In 1971, he became the ninth editor-in-chief of Harper's Magazine.

After leaving Harper's in 1976, Shnayerson founded Quest. In January 1981, he and five senior colleagues resigned from Quest after he refused to publish an article by publisher Herbert W. Armstrong with virtually no editing.

Shnayerson's interest in the law led to the publication of The Illustrated History of the Supreme Court of the United States by Abrams in association with the Supreme Court Historical Society in 1986.

== Personal life ==
Shnayerson married Lydia Conde Todd in 1950. After her death in 1973, he married Laurie Platt Winfrey in 1980. He had four children.

Shnayerson died at his home in Hillsdale, New York, on March 6, 2022, of complications of vascular disease, aged 96.

== Bibliography ==
- The Illustrated History of the Supreme Court of the United States (1986)
