= Organized Crime Control Act of 1970 =

United States Law

- Other short titles: Racketeer Influenced and Corrupt Organizations Act
- Long title: An Act relating to the control of organized crime in the United States.
- Acronyms (colloquial): OCCA; RICO
- Nicknames: Organized Crime Control Act of 1970
- Enacted by: the 91st United States Congress
- Effective: October 15, 1970

Citations
- Public law: 91-452
- Statutes at Large: 84 Stat. 922-3

Codification
- Titles amended: 18 U.S.C.: Crimes and Criminal Procedure
- U.S.C. sections created: 18 U.S.C. ch. 73 §§ 1501-1510; 18 U.S.C. ch. 79 § 1621 et seq.; 18 U.S.C. ch. 95 §§ 1951-1954; 18 U.S.C. ch. 96 §§ 1961-1968; 18 U.S.C. ch. 216 § 3331 et seq.; 18 U.S.C. ch. 223 §§ 3481-3502; 18 U.S.C. ch. 601 § 6001 et seq.

Legislative history
- Introduced in the Senate as S. 30 by John L. McClellan (D–AR); Passed the Senate on January 23, 1970 (74-1); Passed the House on October 7, 1970 (341-26); Signed into law by President Richard Nixon on October 15, 1970

The Organized Crime Control Act of 1970 (Pub. L. 91–452, 84 Stat. 922 October 15, 1970) is a federal law to combat organized crime. It was sponsored by Democratic senator John L. McClellan and signed into law by U.S. president Richard Nixon.

== Background ==
The Organized Crime Control Act of 1970 was a major crime reform bill. Its main purpose was to create new tools and legislation that the federal government could utilize to eradicate organized crime. Senator John M. McLellan played a pivotal role in conducting congressional investigations to uncover organized crime's role and ascertain whether the status quo laws were effective tools to address organized crime. Before 1969, in response to these congressional investigations, government officials concluded that the tools were inadequate to address and eradicate the proliferation of the mafia, organized crime, and its infiltration in American society. Federal jurisdiction was restricted in combating organized crime, the evidence-gathering process had shortcomings, and the legislation at the time obstructed efforts to expose crime leaders. Government leaders also realized that local and state governments required more funding and leadership by the federal government to help combat organized crime. Reform efforts established things like witness immunity to help uncover leaders in organized crime and made local illegal gambling a federal crime. In comprehensively reforming legislation, leaders were able to diligently investigate and punish organized crime.

== Legislative History ==
On January 10, 1969, veteran crime fighter and law advocate Senator John L. McLellan introduced President-endorsed Bill S. 30 containing 9 titles dedicated to curbing organized crime in America. The Senate Judiciary Subcommittee on Criminal Laws and Procedures began a hearing on March 18, 1969. The bill was later introduced in the House of Representatives on April 1, 1969, and the Senate's Committee on the Judiciary conducted multiple hearings between August and December 1969, which resulted in a committee report on December 18, 1969. The bill was later reintroduced in the House of Representatives on January 21, 1970, while getting debated in the Senate, which resulted in its passage on January 23, 1970, with a roll-call vote of 73-1. The House's subcommittee No. 5 began conducting hearings on May 20, 1970, and the House's Committee on Rules and Judiciary created reports in the consequent months. On October 7, 1970, the 12-title bill S. 30, titled “The Organized Crime Control Act of 1970,” was debated, amended, and passed in the House of Representatives with a roll-call vote of 341-26. On October 12, 1970, both chambers of Congress reconciled their differences to align the bill, and President Richard Nixon signed the bill into law on October 15, 1970.

== Main Provisions ==
Title I—Special Grand Jury. This title authorizes special grand juries to convene as ordered by the Attorney General for periods of up to 36 months. These special grand juries convened under the oversight of a federal district court to return indictments and issue grand jury reports concerning governmental misconduct, legislative or executive recommendations, or organized crime.

Title II—General Immunity. This title authorizes legislative, administrative, and judicial entities to grant witnesses immunity from prosecution predicated on their testimony but not from all prosecution for any act mentioned in their testimony.

Title III—Recaltritant Witnesses. The title authorized the detention or confinement of recalcitrant witnesses linked to organized crime for a maximum of 18 months or until they comply with court orders, and without bail until compliance is achieved.

Title VIII—Syndicated Gambling. This title declared it illegal for individuals to violate state law, especially by corrupting public servants, to support an "illegal gambling business." An illegal gambling business employs at least five employees, operates for over thirty days, or produces $2,000 in gross income in a single day, and it violates state or local laws.

Title IX—Racketeer Influenced And Corrupt Organizations. This title declared it a crime to utilize income obtained through organized crime to acquire, begin, or operate a business that engages in interstate commerce, and it prescribed the use of forfeiture, devices, and special investigative procedures against such crimes.

Title X—Dangerous Special Offender Sentencing. This title authorizes a federal judge to increase sentences up to 30 years for dangerous adult special offenders.
