= James Lennon (Irish politician) =

Irish politician (1880–1958)

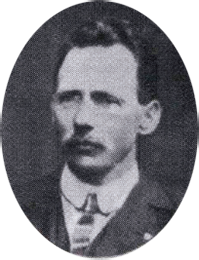
- Lennon, c.1920s

Teachta Dála
- In office May 1921 – June 1922
- Constituency: Carlow–Kilkenny
- In office December 1918 – May 1921
- Constituency: County Carlow

Personal details
- Born: 26 August 1880 Borris, County Carlow, Ireland
- Died: 13 August 1958 (aged 77) County Carlow, Ireland
- Party: Sinn Féin
- Other political affiliations: Irish Monetary Reform Association
- Spouse: Bridie Kelly

James Lennon (also Séamus Lennon; 26 August 1880 – 13 August 1958) was an Irish Sinn Féin politician who sat in the First Dáil. He would later become the founder of the far-right Irish Monetary Reform Association, a political organisation that obtained some strength in the midlands. Lennon's control of the organisation would be usurped by the young Oliver Flanagan, who eventually took control of the organisation from him.

== Early life ==
Lennon was born in Cournellan, Borris, County Carlow.

== Career ==
He was elected unopposed as a Sinn Féin MP for the Carlow constituency at the 1918 general election. In January 1919, Sinn Féin MPs refused to recognise the Parliament of the United Kingdom and instead assembled at the Mansion House in Dublin as a revolutionary parliament called Dáil Éireann, though Lennon did not attend as he was in prison.

He again elected unopposed for the Carlow–Kilkenny constituency at the 1921 elections. He opposed the Anglo-Irish Treaty and voted against it. He stood unsuccessfully as an anti-Treaty Sinn Féin candidate at the 1922 general election. Following this Lennon was arrested, tried and sentenced to five years in prison for his part in the robbery of a bank at Bagenalstown, County Carlow.

Still considering himself an Irish Republican in 1927, Lennon did not endorse Fianna Fáil in either of the two general elections that year as he believed they had reneged on certain core Republican principles. Nevertheless, Lennon offered them tacit support during the 1932 general election.

By 1933 Lennon began to publicly express anti-semitic views, voicing conspiracies that Jews controlled global banking and finance. This would lead Lennon to support Hitler and Nazism, with Lennon extolling Hitler for spreading the "truth" that Jews were responsible for all the poverty in the world.

In 1938 Lennon would found the County Carlow Monetary and National Dividend Association, later to become the Irish Monetary Reform Association. "Monetary Reform" was the Irish terminology for the idea of Social Credit promoted by C. H. Douglas internationally (particularly in Canada). Additionally, the association and Lennon were influenced by Alfred O'Rahilly's book Money which argued for greater state control of commercial banks and the creation of a state bank to regulate credit. In 1941 Lennon was "responsible for the Irish National Monetary Reform Association issuing its historic constitution and manifesto". These documents were "influenced by and based on" the papal encyclicals Rerum novarum and Quadragesimo anno. Lennon and the IMRA sought to promote a fusion of Social Credit ideas with fundamentalist Catholicism and fascistic corporatism. When Alfred O'Rahilly became aware of Lennon's support of his ideas, O'Rahilly quickly distanced himself from Lennon and his extremist rhetoric.

Although Lennon was the principal founder of the IMRA, Lennon was quickly outshone politically by the young Oliver Flanagan. While both Lennon and Flanagan were successful IMRA candidates in the 1942 Irish local elections, Flanagan achieved a meteoric rise by becoming a teachta dála in the 1944 general election. Even before the election, Flanagan's rise was a source of jealousy and infighting amongst the IRMA, which became split into pro-Lennon and pro-Flanagan camps. The in-fighting lead to no IRMA candidate running in the Carlow–Kilkenny constituency but fielding two in Laois–Offaly, where the pro-Lennon Henry Milner was beaten decisively by Flanagan.

In 1947, he named in the Irish Press as the Irish Monetary Reform Association nominee for the Carlow–Kilkenny constituency at the 1948 general election for the party. However, he did not contest the election. A party colleague, William Milner, ran in the neighbouring Laois–Offaly constituency. By 1948 the IRMA had become utterly split between Lennon and Flanagan when Flanagan sought to support candidates from Clann na Talmhan for the Seanad. Lennon and the IMRA "National Executive" claimed it was previously agreed that the IMRA would not support any candidates for the Seanad and that Flanaghan was now in breach of their constitution and should be expelled. Although Flanaghan was indeed expelled for his actions, the bulk of the membership sided with Flanagan, and walked with him into a new, separate organisation called the "Irish Monetary Reform Party". With Flanagan and his supporters continuing to enjoy political success, the original IMRA withered and died away.

By 1955 Lennon had rejoined Sinn Féin, and stood for them at the 1955 Irish local elections, to no success. Lennon died in Carlow on 13 August 1958.

== Death ==
Lennon died on 13 August 1958.

Parliament of the United Kingdom
Preceded by Michael Molloy	Member of Parliament for County Carlow; 1918–1922	Constituency abolished
Oireachtas
New constituency	Teachta Dála for County Carlow; 1918–1921	Constituency abolished

Dáil	Election	Deputy (Party)	Deputy (Party)	Deputy (Party)	Deputy (Party)	Deputy (Party)
2nd	1921	Edward Aylward (SF)	W. T. Cosgrave (SF)	James Lennon (SF)	Gearóid O'Sullivan (SF)	4 seats 1921–1923
3rd	1922	Patrick Gaffney (Lab)	W. T. Cosgrave (PT-SF)	Denis Gorey (FP)	Gearóid O'Sullivan (PT-SF)	4 seats 1921–1923
4th	1923	Edward Doyle (Lab)	W. T. Cosgrave (CnaG)	Denis Gorey (FP)	Michael Shelly (Rep)	Seán Gibbons (CnaG)
4th	1925 by-election	Edward Doyle (Lab)	W. T. Cosgrave (CnaG)	Denis Gorey (FP)	Michael Shelly (Rep)	Thomas Bolger (CnaG)
5th	1927 (Jun)	Edward Doyle (Lab)	W. T. Cosgrave (CnaG)	Denis Gorey (CnaG)	Thomas Derrig (FF)	Richard Holohan (FP)
6th	1927 (Sep)	Edward Doyle (Lab)	W. T. Cosgrave (CnaG)	Peter de Loughry (CnaG)	Thomas Derrig (FF)	Richard Holohan (FP)
6th	1927 by-election	Edward Doyle (Lab)	Denis Gorey (CnaG)	Peter de Loughry (CnaG)	Thomas Derrig (FF)	Richard Holohan (FP)
7th	1932	Francis Humphreys (FF)	Denis Gorey (CnaG)	Desmond FitzGerald (CnaG)	Thomas Derrig (FF)	Seán Gibbons (FF)
8th	1933	James Pattison (Lab)	Richard Holohan (NCP)	Desmond FitzGerald (CnaG)	Thomas Derrig (FF)	Seán Gibbons (FF)
9th	1937	Constituency abolished. See Kilkenny and Carlow–Kildare				

Dáil	Election	Deputy (Party)	Deputy (Party)	Deputy (Party)	Deputy (Party)	Deputy (Party)
13th	1948	James Pattison (NLP)	Thomas Walsh (FF)	Thomas Derrig (FF)	Joseph Hughes (FG)	Patrick Crotty (FG)
14th	1951	Francis Humphreys (FF)	Thomas Walsh (FF)	Thomas Derrig (FF)	Joseph Hughes (FG)	Patrick Crotty (FG)
15th	1954	James Pattison (Lab)	Thomas Walsh (FF)	Thomas Derrig (FF)	Joseph Hughes (FG)	Patrick Crotty (FG)
15th	1956 by-election	James Pattison (Lab)	Martin Medlar (FF)	Thomas Derrig (FF)	Joseph Hughes (FG)	Patrick Crotty (FG)
16th	1957	Francis Humphreys (FF)	Martin Medlar (FF)	Jim Gibbons (FF)	Joseph Hughes (FG)	Patrick Crotty (FG)
16th	1960 by-election	Patrick Teehan (FF)	Martin Medlar (FF)	Jim Gibbons (FF)	Joseph Hughes (FG)	Patrick Crotty (FG)
17th	1961	Séamus Pattison (Lab)	Martin Medlar (FF)	Jim Gibbons (FF)	Desmond Governey (FG)	Patrick Crotty (FG)
18th	1965	Séamus Pattison (Lab)	Tom Nolan (FF)	Jim Gibbons (FF)	Desmond Governey (FG)	Patrick Crotty (FG)
19th	1969	Séamus Pattison (Lab)	Tom Nolan (FF)	Jim Gibbons (FF)	Desmond Governey (FG)	Kieran Crotty (FG)
20th	1973	Séamus Pattison (Lab)	Tom Nolan (FF)	Jim Gibbons (FF)	Desmond Governey (FG)	Kieran Crotty (FG)
21st	1977	Séamus Pattison (Lab)	Tom Nolan (FF)	Jim Gibbons (FF)	Liam Aylward (FF)	Kieran Crotty (FG)
22nd	1981	Séamus Pattison (Lab)	Tom Nolan (FF)	Desmond Governey (FG)	Liam Aylward (FF)	Kieran Crotty (FG)
23rd	1982 (Feb)	Séamus Pattison (Lab)	Jim Gibbons (FF)	Desmond Governey (FG)	Liam Aylward (FF)	Kieran Crotty (FG)
24th	1982 (Nov)	Séamus Pattison (Lab)	M. J. Nolan (FF)	Dick Dowling (FG)	Liam Aylward (FF)	Kieran Crotty (FG)
25th	1987	Séamus Pattison (Lab)	M. J. Nolan (FF)	Martin Gibbons (PDs)	Liam Aylward (FF)	Kieran Crotty (FG)
26th	1989	Séamus Pattison (Lab)	M. J. Nolan (FF)	Phil Hogan (FG)	Liam Aylward (FF)	John Browne (FG)
27th	1992	Séamus Pattison (Lab)	M. J. Nolan (FF)	Phil Hogan (FG)	Liam Aylward (FF)	John Browne (FG)
28th	1997	Séamus Pattison (Lab)	John McGuinness (FF)	Phil Hogan (FG)	Liam Aylward (FF)	John Browne (FG)
29th	2002	Séamus Pattison (Lab)	John McGuinness (FF)	Phil Hogan (FG)	Liam Aylward (FF)	M. J. Nolan (FF)
30th	2007	Mary White (GP)	John McGuinness (FF)	Phil Hogan (FG)	Bobby Aylward (FF)	M. J. Nolan (FF)
31st	2011	Ann Phelan (Lab)	John McGuinness (FF)	Phil Hogan (FG)	John Paul Phelan (FG)	Pat Deering (FG)
31st	2015 by-election	Ann Phelan (Lab)	John McGuinness (FF)	Bobby Aylward (FF)	John Paul Phelan (FG)	Pat Deering (FG)
32nd	2016	Kathleen Funchion (SF)	John McGuinness (FF)	Bobby Aylward (FF)	John Paul Phelan (FG)	Pat Deering (FG)
33rd	2020	Kathleen Funchion (SF)	John McGuinness (FF)	Jennifer Murnane O'Connor (FF)	John Paul Phelan (FG)	Malcolm Noonan (GP)
34th	2024	Natasha Newsome Drennan (SF)	John McGuinness (FF)	Jennifer Murnane O'Connor (FF)	Catherine Callaghan (FG)	Peter "Chap" Cleere (FF)
