= Ted Russell (Irish politician) =

Irish politician (1912–2004)

Senator
- In office 5 November 1969 – 27 October 1977
- Constituency: Industrial and Commercial Panel

Teachta Dála
- In office March 1957 – October 1961
- Constituency: Limerick East

Personal details
- Born: George Edward Russell; 9 April 1912 Limerick, Ireland
- Died: 28 November 2004 (aged 92) Limerick, Ireland
- Party: Fine Gael; Clann na Poblachta; Independent
- Spouse: Dervilla Gleeson (m. 1938)
- Children: 4
- Education: Crescent College; Mount St Benedict's, Gorey; Stonyhurst College

George Edward Russell (9 April 1912 – 28 November 2004) was an Irish politician and company director.

== Early life ==
He was born 9 April 1912 in the family home at 4 Moyola Terrace, Limerick, the eldest of two sons and a daughter of Matthew John Russell and his wife Mary (née Rohan). His grandfather George established a bakery in Limerick in 1870 and represented Irishtown ward on Limerick City Council. His father continued the business and in the 1920s acquired control of Dan O'Connor Ltd, a corn and provisions merchant founded in 1848 by Ted's granduncle.

Russell was educated first at Crescent College in Limerick, and for a short time Mount St Benedict's near Gorey; and at Stonyhurst College in Lancashire.

From 1930 he played rugby for Bohemians RFC as a second‑row forward, being captain for two seasons (1935–1937), and maintained a lifelong association with Bohemians, serving as club president in 1967–1968. He was selected for Munster Rugby during 1936–1938. In 1938 he had a final trial for Ireland and might have achieved international honours but for the outbreak of World War II, though he believed that he was too lightweight.

== Politics ==
Russell first stood for election as a Clann na Poblachta candidate at the 1948 general election but was not elected. He was also an unsuccessful candidate at the 1951 general election and the 1952 Limerick East by-election. He was first elected to Dáil Éireann as an Independent Teachta Dála (TD) for the Limerick East constituency at the 1957 general election. He lost his seat at the 1961 general election. He was elected to the 12th Seanad in 1969 on the Industrial and Commercial Panel and was re-elected to the 13th Seanad in 1973. He was defeated at the 1977 Seanad election. He unsuccessfully contested the 1965 general election as a Fine Gael candidate.

He was a longtime member of Limerick Corporation, elected first as an independent (1942) and later as a member of Gluais Linn (1945), Clann na Poblachta (1950, 1955), and Fine Gael (1960, 1967, 1974, 1979). He served as Mayor of Limerick on five occasions (1954–1957, 1967–1968 and 1976–1977). He was made a Freeman of the city in 1995. and was awarded an honorary doctorate by the University of Limerick in 2002.

He was the President of the Limerick Chamber from 1948 to 1950.

== Later life ==
Russell was active in the campaign for the establishment of a university in Limerick, which led to the establishment of the National Institute for Higher Education (later the University of Limerick) in 1972.

In 1938, he married Dervilla Gleeson of Nenagh, and they had four children.

Dáil	Election	Deputy (Party)	Deputy (Party)	Deputy (Party)	Deputy (Party)	Deputy (Party)
13th	1948	Michael Keyes (Lab)	Robert Ryan (FF)	James Reidy (FG)	Daniel Bourke (FF)	4 seats 1948–1981
14th	1951	Michael Keyes (Lab)	Tadhg Crowley (FF)	James Reidy (FG)	Daniel Bourke (FF)	4 seats 1948–1981
14th	1952 by-election	Michael Keyes (Lab)	Tadhg Crowley (FF)	James Reidy (FG)	John Carew (FG)	4 seats 1948–1981
15th	1954	Michael Keyes (Lab)	Tadhg Crowley (FF)	Donogh O'Malley (FF)	John Carew (FG)	4 seats 1948–1981
16th	1957	Ted Russell (Ind.)	Paddy Clohessy (FF)	Donogh O'Malley (FF)	John Carew (FG)	4 seats 1948–1981
17th	1961	Stephen Coughlan (Lab)	Paddy Clohessy (FF)	Donogh O'Malley (FF)	Tom O'Donnell (FG)	4 seats 1948–1981
18th	1965	Stephen Coughlan (Lab)	Paddy Clohessy (FF)	Donogh O'Malley (FF)	Tom O'Donnell (FG)	4 seats 1948–1981
18th	1968 by-election	Stephen Coughlan (Lab)	Paddy Clohessy (FF)	Desmond O'Malley (FF)	Tom O'Donnell (FG)	4 seats 1948–1981
19th	1969	Stephen Coughlan (Lab)	Michael Herbert (FF)	Desmond O'Malley (FF)	Tom O'Donnell (FG)	4 seats 1948–1981
20th	1973	Stephen Coughlan (Lab)	Michael Herbert (FF)	Desmond O'Malley (FF)	Tom O'Donnell (FG)	4 seats 1948–1981
21st	1977	Michael Lipper (Ind.)	Michael Herbert (FF)	Desmond O'Malley (FF)	Tom O'Donnell (FG)	4 seats 1948–1981
22nd	1981	Jim Kemmy (Ind.)	Peadar Clohessy (FF)	Desmond O'Malley (FF)	Tom O'Donnell (FG)	Michael Noonan (FG)
23rd	1982 (Feb)	Jim Kemmy (DSP)	Willie O'Dea (FF)	Desmond O'Malley (FF)	Tom O'Donnell (FG)	Michael Noonan (FG)
24th	1982 (Nov)	Frank Prendergast (Lab)	Willie O'Dea (FF)	Desmond O'Malley (FF)	Tom O'Donnell (FG)	Michael Noonan (FG)
25th	1987	Jim Kemmy (DSP)	Willie O'Dea (FF)	Desmond O'Malley (PDs)	Peadar Clohessy (PDs)	Michael Noonan (FG)
26th	1989	Jim Kemmy (DSP)	Willie O'Dea (FF)	Desmond O'Malley (PDs)	Peadar Clohessy (PDs)	Michael Noonan (FG)
27th	1992	Jim Kemmy (Lab)	Willie O'Dea (FF)	Desmond O'Malley (PDs)	Peadar Clohessy (PDs)	Michael Noonan (FG)
28th	1997	Jim Kemmy (Lab)	Willie O'Dea (FF)	Desmond O'Malley (PDs)	Eddie Wade (FF)	Michael Noonan (FG)
28th	1998 by-election	Jan O'Sullivan (Lab)	Willie O'Dea (FF)	Desmond O'Malley (PDs)	Eddie Wade (FF)	Michael Noonan (FG)
29th	2002	Jan O'Sullivan (Lab)	Willie O'Dea (FF)	Tim O'Malley (PDs)	Peter Power (FF)	Michael Noonan (FG)
30th	2007	Jan O'Sullivan (Lab)	Willie O'Dea (FF)	Kieran O'Donnell (FG)	Peter Power (FF)	Michael Noonan (FG)
31st	2011	Constituency abolished. See Limerick City and Limerick				
