= Irish Monetary Reform Association =

Defunct right wing party in Ireland

- Founder: Seamus Lennon
- Leader: Oliver J. Flanagan
- Founded: c. 1941
- Dissolved: Flanagan faction: 1952; Carlow faction: c. 1970s
- Merged into: Fine Gael
- Ideology: Irish nationalism; Social credit; Christian corporatism; Anti-capitalism; Anti-communism; Antisemitism
- Political position: Far-right
- Religion: Catholicism

The Irish Monetary Reform Association (also known as the Monetary Reform Party) was a minor Irish political party that existed from the 1940s to the 1960s. It can be seen as the most successful of a wave of minor far-right parties in 1940s Ireland, alongside Ailtirí na hAiséirghe.

The party was founded by Seamus Lennon, a former anti-Treaty Sinn Féin TD, in County Carlow in 1940. It echoed many ideas associated with the earlier Social Credit Party, but also emphasised Catholic social teaching and campaigned against communism and what it claimed was Jewish and Freemason influence on Irish economic policy. The party won a number of seats in the 1942 local elections, and one of their new councillors, Oliver J. Flanagan, was elected TD for the constituency of Laois–Offaly in 1943.

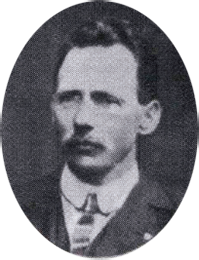
James Lennon, circa 1920s, circa 1920s

Oliver J. Flanagan, circa 1948

Flanagan became the most prominent member of the party, and, as such, it is difficult to draw conclusions about the party apart from those about Flanagan himself. Early on, he played on certain themes of the Social Credit movement, which accentuated his image as an antisemitic politician. Within months, however, Lennon attempted to expel Flanagan from the party in a dispute about nominations to the Irish Seanad. This resulted in a split into two factions, with Lennon's 'Monetary Reform Association' based in Carlow and Flanagan's 'Monetary Reform Party' based in Laois-Offaly. Both groups won seats in the 1945 local elections, and they competed against each other in Laois–Offaly in the 1948 general election, but both suffered declining votes thereafter. In 1952, Flanagan's organisation merged with Fine Gael, and he went on to become a long-serving TD for that party. The Carlow-based faction continued to hold local government seats until the early 1970s, while its former general election candidate, W.H. Milner, was involved in the far-right Lia Fáil party in the late 1950s, which shared many of the same political opinions.

== Electoral history ==
=== General election ===
Election	Seats won	±	Position	First Pref votes	%
1943	1 / 144	New	▲5th	4,377	0.3%
1944	1 / 144	Steady	▼6th	9,856	0.8%
1948	1 / 144	Steady	▼7th	14,369	1.1%
