= Oliver J. Flanagan =

Irish politician (1920–1987)

- Flanagan, c. 1948

Minister for Defence
- In office 16 December 1976 – 5 July 1977
- Taoiseach: Liam Cosgrave
- Preceded by: Liam Cosgrave
- Succeeded by: Bobby Molloy

Parliamentary Secretary
- 1975–1976: Local Government
- 1954–1957: Agriculture

Teachta Dála
- In office June 1943 – February 1987
- Constituency: Laois–Offaly

Personal details
- Born: 22 May 1920 Mountmellick, County Laois, Ireland
- Died: 26 April 1987 (aged 66) County Laois, Ireland
- Party: Fine Gael (after 1952)
- Other political affiliations: Fianna Fáil (until July 1941); Monetary Reform (until 1952)
- Spouse: May McWey (m. 1952)
- Children: 4, including Charles
- Education: Mountmellick Boys' National School

Oliver James Flanagan (22 May 1920 – 26 April 1987) was an Irish Fine Gael politician who served as Minister for Defence from 1976 to 1977 and as a Parliamentary Secretary from 1954 to 1957 and from 1975 to 1976. He represented the Laois–Offaly constituency as a Teachta Dála (TD) from 1943 to 1987, one of the longest periods of continuous service in the history of Dáil Éireann.

Flanagan first entered public life as a member of Fianna Fáil before breaking with the party in 1941 to embrace the Irish Monetary Reform Association (IMRA), a small, antisemitic social credit movement confined largely to his native County Laois. Standing on the IMRA ticket, he was elected to the Dáil in 1943 at the age of 23, among the youngest deputies ever to take a seat in the chamber. His maiden speech, delivered that July, called on the government to "rout the Jews out of this country", a statement made as Nazi Germany was carrying out the Holocaust in Europe. His maiden speech has been described as "perhaps the most outrageous anti-Jewish outburst in the Dáil's history". Flanagan went on to develop associations with figures on Ireland's pro-Axis far right during the Emergency years, connections that faded after the end of the Second World War.

In 1952, after a protracted and often bitter split within the IMRA's successor organisation, the Monetary Reform Party, Flanagan joined Fine Gael. He went on to top the poll in Laois–Offaly at almost every subsequent election, building a reputation as one of the Dáil's foremost constituency operators. He served as Parliamentary Secretary to the Minister for Agriculture from 1954 to 1957, and was appointed to Cabinet as Minister for Defence in December 1976, a position he held until the defeat of the Fine Gael-Labour coalition government in 1977. He was Father of the Dáil from 1981 until he retired from politics in 1987, shortly before his death.

A devout and outspoken social conservative, Flanagan became one of the most recognisable figures in post-war Irish public life, best remembered for his remark, made in 1966 in reaction to an edition of The Late Late Show, that "Sex never came to Ireland before Telefís Éireann went on the air", which was later widely paraphrased as "there was no sex in Ireland before television". He was a lifelong opponent of contraception, divorce and abortion, and was twice expelled, and twice reinstated, as a member of Fine Gael over his opposition to legislation sponsored by his own party. He was made a Knight of the Order of St Gregory the Great by Pope John Paul I in 1978. He died in County Laois on 26 April 1987, two months after declining to contest the 1987 Irish general election; his son, Charles Flanagan, succeeded him in the Laois–Offaly constituency.

== Early life ==
Oliver James Flanagan was born on 22 May 1920 in Mountmellick, County Laois, the eldest of three sons of Charles Flanagan, a stonemason, and Mary Flanagan (née Kelly). His brothers were Ted, who became a carpenter, and Charles, who became a missionary priest. He was educated at Mountmellick Boys' National School.

Although his parents had little interest in politics, and he came from what one historian has described as a "firmly apolitical family", Flanagan developed an interest in political affairs from a young age. He attempted an apprenticeship as a carpenter in Portlaoise, which he did not complete, and later described his early working life simply as that of "an organiser", engaged in organising workers' groups around Mountmellick.

== Political career ==
=== Fianna Fáil and Irish Monetary Reform Association (1938–1943) ===
In 1938, at the age of eighteen, he became secretary of the Mountmellick cumann of Fianna Fáil, a role in which he quickly gained a reputation for diligence on local matters, including repeated, ultimately unsuccessful, representations for a reduction in the tax on alcohol in defence of the malting industry that employed many in the town.

By the beginning of the 1940s, Flanagan had grown disillusioned with Fianna Fáil's handling of unemployment, poverty and emigration. In January 1941, he wrote to a local newspaper describing an Ireland where "life is hardly worth living" and expressing fear that he was witnessing the "approaching death of the Irish nation", which he attributed to a "shortage of money". The letter marked his public conversion to the Irish Monetary Reform Association, a small social credit movement founded in County Carlow in the late 1930s under the influence of Seamus Lennon, which blamed Ireland's economic difficulties on the alleged domination of the financial system by "Jewish-Masonic bankers".

Flanagan became secretary of the IMRA's Laois executive and was instrumental in establishing branches across the county. His growing commitment to the organisation made his continued membership of Fianna Fáil untenable, and he was expelled from the party in late July 1941; in protest, the entire membership of his Mountmellick cumann resigned alongside him and dissolved itself.

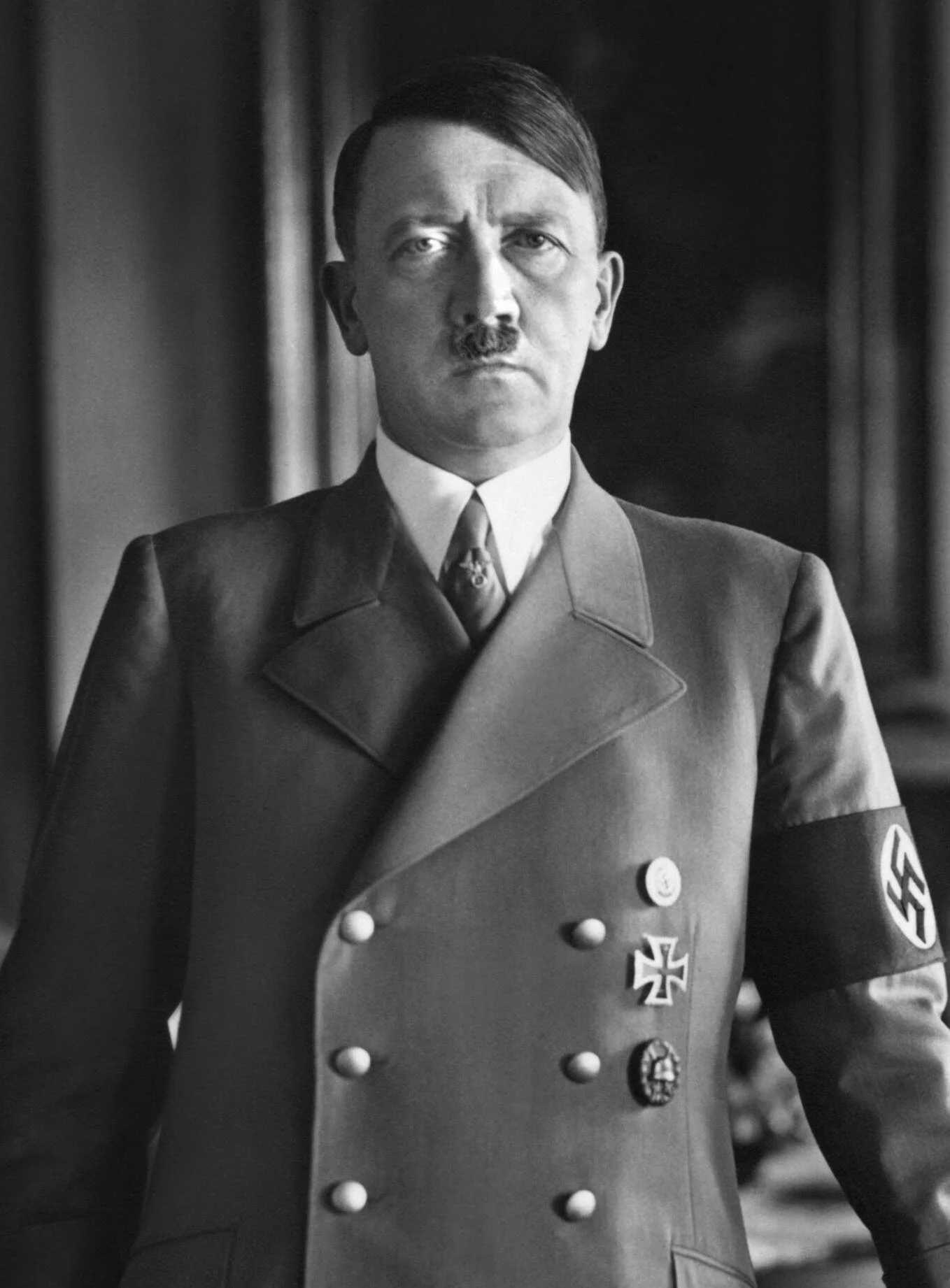
Flanagan once told a crowd of constituents in 1943 he "only" agreed with "99.5%" of Hitler's policies

Flanagan was elected to Laois County Council at the 1942 local elections, alongside four other IMRA candidates returned to the councils of Laois, Offaly and Carlow, a council seat he would go on to hold for almost forty-five years. Addressing a public meeting in Mountrath in early 1943, Flanagan said he "only" agreed with "ninety-nine and a half per cent" of Adolf Hitler's policies and expressed the hope that the German dictator would "knock the stuffing out of the Jews, the Americans and John Bull". In the same speech, he urged those facing eviction to resist bailiffs with the "iron sprong", and said he would give "a medal and a pension" to any man who robbed a bank. The remarks led to a prosecution for incitement to breach the peace; Flanagan avoided conviction by undertaking not to repeat the comments, a promise he did not keep, and he remained a figure of ongoing interest to the Garda Síochána thereafter.

=== Election to the Dáil and the Second World War (1943–1945) ===
Flanagan stood as the IMRA's sole candidate at the 1943 Irish general election, having written to the antisemitic conspiracy theorist Fr Denis Fahey of his intention to contest the seat for "God and Ireland" against the "Jew-Masonic system". He was elected to Dáil Éireann for Laois–Offaly, taking the final seat with 4,377 first-preference votes, and was, at twenty-three, among the youngest people ever elected to the Dáil to that point.

He used his maiden speech, on 9 July 1943, during debate on the renewal of the Emergency Powers Act 1939, to attack the government for interning republican prisoners while, in his telling, leaving the "real enemy" untouched:

How is it that we do not see any of these Acts directed against the Jews, who crucified Our Saviour nineteen hundred years ago, and who are crucifying us every day in the week? [...] There is one thing that Germany did, and that was to rout the Jews out of their country. Until we rout the Jews out of this country it does not matter a hair's breadth what orders you make. Where the bees are there is the honey, and where the Jews are there is the money.

— Oliver Flanagan, Dáil Éireann, 9 July 1943.

Delivered as Jewish communities across occupied Europe were being sent to their deaths in the Holocaust, the speech drew no recorded rebuke from other TDs at the time, an absence of reaction that historians have cited as evidence of how far antisemitic sentiment was tolerated in wartime Irish public life.

In the same speech, Flanagan also turned on James Dillon, who had broken with Fine Gael the previous year over his support for the Allied war effort and was then sitting as an independent TD. Noting that Dillon had publicly called for Ireland to join the war on Britain's side, Flanagan complained that no action had been taken against him, telling the Dáil he was "surprised to see Deputy Dillon free", since, had he himself made such statements, "I would have been in jail long ago". The remark reflected Flanagan's own sympathy for neutrality, and implicitly for Germany, at a point when he and Dillon stood on opposite sides of the debate over Irish participation in the war; in later years he went on, on at least one occasion, to describe Dillon as the "greatest hypocrite" in the Dáil. Despite this early antagonism, the two men became close political allies within a decade.

As a single-issue independent, Flanagan refused to vote for any candidate for Taoiseach, regarding the formation of a government as pointless while control of the currency lay outside the State's hands; his efforts to raise monetary reform in the Dáil met chiefly with derision, Seán Lemass telling him at one point that he was "not entitled to a fool's licence here".

From late 1943, Flanagan developed links with figures on the pro-Axis fringe of Irish politics, acting as an unofficial Dáil mouthpiece for Ailtirí na hAiséirghe, a fascist party led by Gearóid Ó Cuinneagáin, raising matters in the House on the party's behalf, including complaints about the censorship of Ó Cuinneagáin's speeches. He was re-elected at the 1944 Irish general election with more than twice his 1943 vote, doing so without the backing of Lennon; the IMRA had split that year after Flanagan backed a Clann na Talmhan candidate for the Seanad against the wishes of Lennon's national executive, which expelled him. Flanagan retained the loyalty of the great majority of the organisation's branches, based in his own constituency, which were reconstituted as the Monetary Reform Party.

A 1945 court case, in which Frederick Carr accused Kevin Cahill of slander during a car journey following celebrations of Flanagan's election victory, further illustrated the breadth of his associations on the far right; also present in the car were members of Ailtirí na hAiséirghe, the Irish Friends of Germany, An Córas Gaedhealach and the Celtic Cooperation of Occupational Guilds. On 17 July 1945, during a Dáil debate on Éamon de Valera's condolence visit to the German minister in Dublin following the death of Adolf Hitler, James Dillon was in the midst of denouncing Nazism and the Führer when Flanagan interjected, "I hope he is alive". His active involvement with Ailtirí na hAiséirghe appears to have ended shortly afterwards; his last recorded Dáil intervention on the party's behalf came in May 1945.

=== Monetary Reform Party, the Locke Tribunal and the Inter-Party Government (1945–1951) ===
Freed from Lennon's influence, Flanagan's Monetary Reform Party gained seats on Laois County Council and Mountmellick Town Commission at the 1945 local elections and claimed 56 branches nationally, the great majority of them in Laois–Offaly. Although the party's rhetoric increasingly centred on constituency matters rather than monetary theory, with one local newspaper observing that "Monetary Reform candidates know little of Monetary Reform and, indeed, care less: the only plank in their platform is the engaging personality of Mr. O.J. Flanagan, TD", Flanagan's antisemitism persisted after the war; in 1947, he called on the Minister for Justice to protect the country "from the influence and destruction of aliens and Jews".

In November 1947, Flanagan accused the Fianna Fáil government, including Éamon de Valera, Minister for Justice Gerald Boland and Minister for Industry and Commerce Seán Lemass, of favouring a Swiss-based syndicate in the sale of Locke's Distillery in Kilbeggan, County Westmeath, alleging, among other things, that a member of the syndicate had given de Valera's son a gold watch "in order to soften things". A tribunal of inquiry was established; it later emerged that the purchasing syndicate was itself fraudulent, but the tribunal found no evidence to support Flanagan's specific allegations of political corruption, concluding that his evidence had been offered "with a degree of recklessness amounting to complete irresponsibility" and that it had been necessary "to exercise extreme caution in dealing with the evidence of Deputy Flanagan".

The finding did not hurt Flanagan's standing in his constituency. He topped the poll nationally at the 1948 Irish general election with 14,369 first-preference votes and sent a telegram to de Valera declaring that "Leix–Offaly's answer to Locke tribunal leaves no doubt as to belief in existence of corruption". Fianna Fáil lost its Dáil majority at the same election, and Flanagan helped James Dillon assemble the independent support needed to install John A. Costello as Taoiseach, forming the First Inter-Party Government.

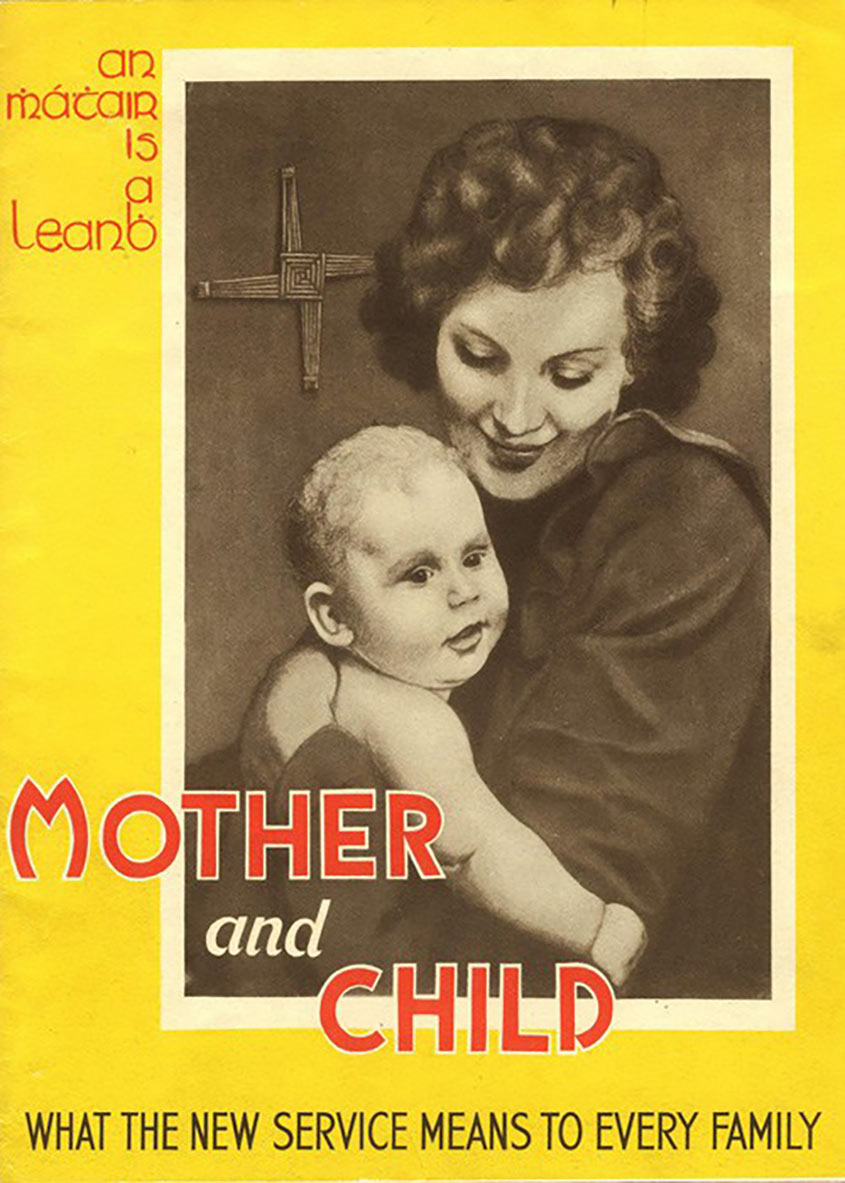
Cover of a Booklet promoting the Mother and Child Scheme, 1947. Flanagan defended Noël Browne against accusations from the Catholic Church that he was attempting to bring socialist policies to Ireland

Flanagan supported the Inter-Party Government throughout its existence, a marked change from his previous opposition to successive administrations. When the government collapsed in 1951 over the Mother and Child Scheme, he was among the small number of deputies who defended the resigning Minister for Health, Noël Browne, telling the Dáil that Browne was not merely the best Minister for Health the country had ever had, but "the best Minister for Health in any Government in Europe"; the two had developed a personal friendship after Browne, then treating patients with tuberculosis, visited Flanagan in hospital during an earlier illness. Flanagan contested the 1951 Irish general election for the final time as a Monetary Reform candidate, retaining his seat as Fianna Fáil returned to power.

=== Joining Fine Gael and the Dáil restaurant assault (1952) ===
On 12 May 1952, following the return of James Dillon to Fine Gael, Flanagan joined the party; the Monetary Reform Party, by then little more than Flanagan's personal electoral organisation, endorsed the move and dissolved itself.

Later that year, Flanagan was involved in a widely reported assault in the Leinster House restaurant, the background to which lay in the career of the Kerry South TD John "Jack" Flynn. A Fianna Fáil deputy since 1932, Flynn had been dropped from the party's general-election ticket ahead of 1943 on the instruction of Éamon de Valera; no reason was given publicly at the time, but it was widely understood within Fianna Fáil that Flynn, then a bachelor, had fathered a child out of wedlock with a young woman who subsequently left for England, and that de Valera had acted to avoid a public scandal. The allegation was never proven. Flynn was returned to the Dáil as an independent TD at the 1947 and 1951 elections before rejoining Fianna Fáil later in 1951.

During debate on the Order of Business on 31 January 1952, the Independent TD Noël Browne raised a query about an Adoption of Children Bill, referring to a list mentioned by Liam Cosgrave; when Cosgrave denied having referred to any such Bill, Flanagan interjected from the Independent benches, "Deputy Flynn would be more qualified to do that", a direct reference to the rumour surrounding Flynn's departure from Fianna Fáil nine years earlier. Flynn was not present in the chamber at the time. That evening, as Flanagan dined in the Dáil restaurant with James Dillon, Flynn approached him from behind, turned him around and struck him twice in the mouth; Flynn also assaulted an usher who attempted to intervene. The Fine Gael leader John A. Costello gave the Dáil a detailed account of the assault that same night, though the Fianna Fáil TD Robert Briscoe, who had himself been present in the restaurant, disputed Costello's version on the grounds that Costello had not witnessed the incident directly. The three main national newspapers reported the assault and the subsequent inquiry extensively but, in keeping with the discretion then customary in Irish journalism on matters of sexual conduct, none identified the substance of the remark that had provoked it.

The Dáil's Committee on Procedure and Privileges subsequently found that Flynn had been "guilty of contempt in taking, as it were, the law into his own hands in redress of a grievance properly a matter for the House itself", while also finding Flanagan's original remark to have been "in breach of the order and decorum of the House". Flynn received a formal reprimand from the Ceann Comhairle on 5 March 1952.

=== Backbencher and junior minister (1954–1973) ===
Flanagan won a Dáil seat for Fine Gael at the 1954 general election and, at the instigation of his ally James Dillon, was appointed Parliamentary Secretary to the Minister for Agriculture in the second Inter-Party Government, a post he held until 1957. When Fine Gael returned to opposition that year, Dillon placed him on the party's front bench as spokesperson on Lands, a position he held until 1969.

Flanagan remained a prominent and energetic constituency campaigner through the 1960s; his son Charles later recalled canvassing with his father outside churches in Clonbullogue, County Offaly, during the 1965 general election, under the catch cry "Put them out!", directed at the long-serving Fianna Fáil government. In 1966, reacting to what he regarded as The Late Late Show's pushing of boundaries, Flanagan told Gay Byrne that "Sex never came to Ireland before Telefís Éireann went on the air" (which was later widely paraphrased as "there was no sex in Ireland before television") a remark that became the most widely quoted of his career and was later referenced in Christy Moore's song "Lisdoonvarna".

In August 1969, Flanagan told the General Council of Committees of Agriculture that "too much of our land has fallen into German hands", declared that Ireland had "no room [...] for Nazis" and called on the Land Commission to repossess land held by German buyers. A contemporary Magill commentary by Vincent Browne (Note: Vincent Browne is no relation to the Noël Browne referenced in this article) likened him to Enoch Powell and described the remarks as "a good old-fashioned fascist speech". The episode, together with an earlier dispute over political patronage, marked the start of a long-running animosity between Flanagan and Garret FitzGerald, then a rising figure on the liberal wing of Fine Gael.

=== Minister of State and Minister for Defence (1973–1977) ===
Flanagan was part of the Fine Gael–Labour coalition government elected in 1973. In July 1974, he was one of two Fine Gael backbenchers, along with Tom Enright, who voted against their own government's Control of Importation, Sale and Manufacture of Contraceptives Bill, helping to defeat it by a handful of votes; addressing the Dáil for three hours, he warned the legislation would be "the raising of the latch of the sluice gates of every kind of immorality".

In 1975, he was appointed Parliamentary Secretary to the Minister for Local Government. On 16 October 1976, Flanagan was the intended target of a Provisional IRA booby-trap bombing at an abandoned farmhouse at Garryhinch, on the Laois–Offaly border. Acting on an anonymous tip-off that gunmen were preparing to attack Flanagan, five gardaí approached the building; a gas cylinder packed with explosives detonated as Garda Michael Clerkin entered, killing the 24-year-old instantly and seriously injuring his four colleagues. No one was ever convicted of the murder. Flanagan's family were telephoned by gardaí that night and warned not to leave the house.

Two months later, on 16 December 1976, Flanagan was appointed Minister for Defence by Taoiseach Liam Cosgrave, succeeding Cosgrave himself, who had been acting in the role since the removal of Patrick Donegan over the "thundering disgrace" controversy. He served for six months, until the coalition lost office at the 1977 Irish general election. Writing shortly afterwards to the outgoing Taoiseach, Flanagan reflected that "there appears to be no place in Irish politics for honesty", adding that those in public life "often neglect our homes and children when we should be with them instead of rendering service to an ungrateful people".

=== Father of the Dáil and later career (1977–1987) ===
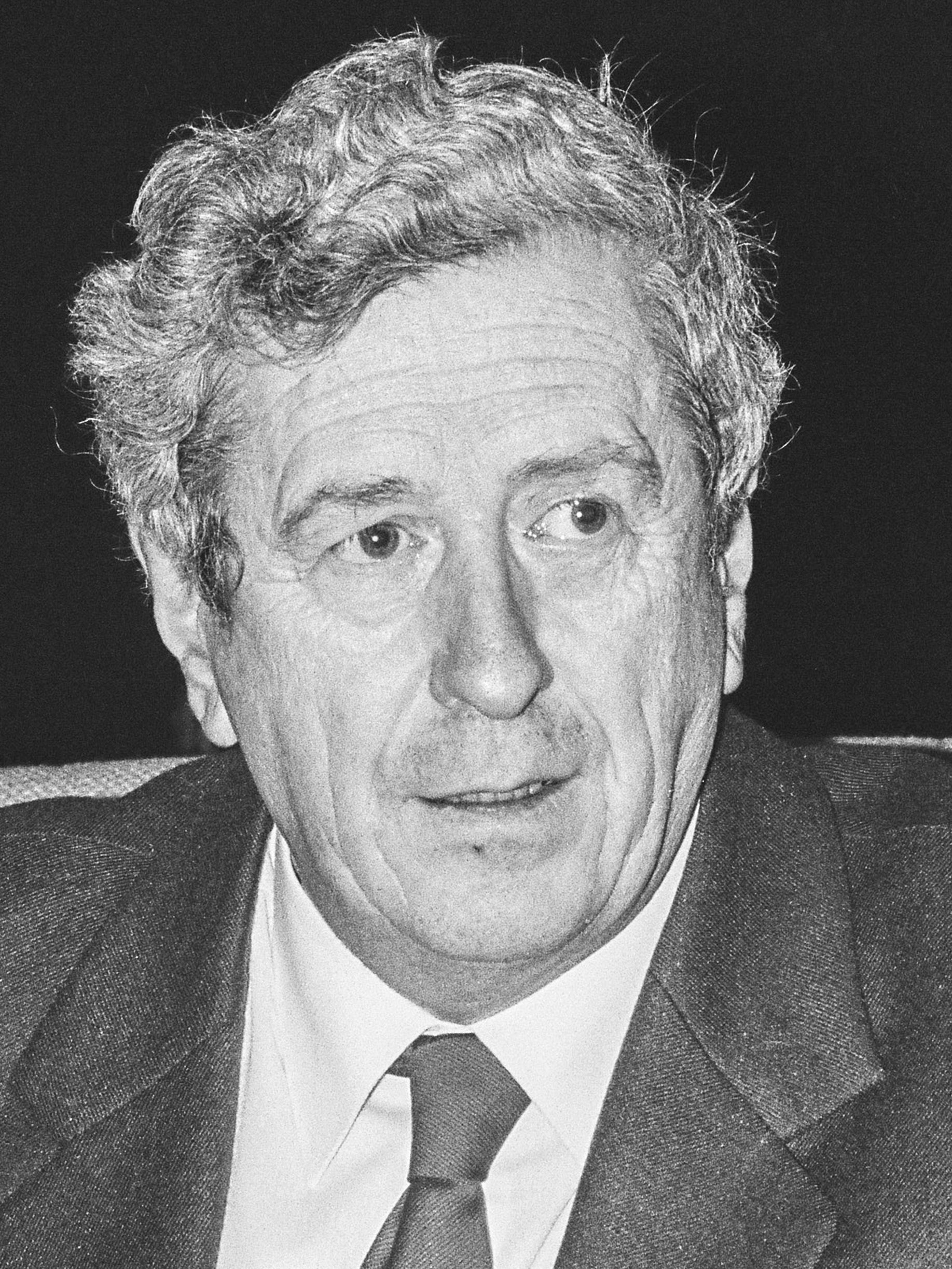
Garret FitzGerald was both leader of the country and leader of Flanagan's political party, but Flanagan chaffed against FitzGerald both personally and ideologically

Flanagan served as a representative on the Parliamentary Assembly of the Council of Europe from 1977 to 1987, an appointment some observers regarded as a means of accommodating a figure increasingly out of step with the more liberal wing of Fine Gael then taking shape under Garret FitzGerald. He became Father of the Dáil in 1981, succeeding Liam Cosgrave, and in that capacity formally proposed FitzGerald's nomination as Taoiseach on 1 July 1981, notwithstanding years of friction between the two men.

In September 1978, Pope John Paul I conferred on Flanagan a Knighthood of the Order of St Gregory the Great. Flanagan subsequently began styling himself "Sir Oliver", stating that it was his constituents who had first used the title and that it "would be wrong of me not to accept" it. His adoption of the honorific prompted a government inquiry into whether papal honours carried any entitlement to a style recognised under Article 40.2 of the Constitution, unlike British honours such as the Knight Commander of the British Empire; officials found no precedent for papal knights using the title "Sir", and the government never formally sanctioned its use.

Flanagan's final years in the Dáil were marked by open conflict with FitzGerald, particularly over the 1983 pro-life referendum campaign. FitzGerald had pledged before the 1981 and February 1982 elections to introduce a constitutional amendment on abortion, but his government's eventual wording was attacked by Flanagan and other dissidents within Fine Gael as a betrayal of that commitment; Flanagan was among a small group, including Tom O'Donnell and Michael Joe Cosgrave, who used the controversy to settle older grievances with the party leader. In a lengthy speech to the parliamentary party on 20 April 1983, Flanagan's hostility towards FitzGerald was described by one commentator as having reached its "apotheosis".

In February 1985, Flanagan was one of three Fine Gael deputies, along with Alice Glenn and Tom O'Donnell, who voted against their own government's Family Planning Bill, which proposed ending the requirement for a doctor's prescription to purchase contraceptives; the bill passed by a margin of two votes, 83 to 81, and all three deputies were temporarily expelled from the parliamentary party for their opposition. The following year, Flanagan campaigned against the 1986 divorce referendum, despite it having been proposed by his own party's government; during the Dáil debate, he invoked the multiple marriages of the actress Elizabeth Taylor as a cautionary example, a comparison the journalist Colm Tóibín wrote had the effect of shifting the terms of the debate away from divorce as a remedy for marital breakdown. The referendum was defeated.

Due to ill health, Flanagan did not contest the 1987 general election, though he insisted on attending the Dáil for an adjournment vote on 19 December 1986, declining all offers of a pair despite his failing condition. He was succeeded in Laois–Offaly by his son, Charles Flanagan, and died in County Laois on 26 April 1987, two months after the election.

=== Electoral results ===
Elections to the Dáil
Party	Election		FPv	FPv%	Result
Monetary Reform	Leix–Offaly	1943	4,377	9.2	Elected on count 11/11
Monetary Reform	Leix–Offaly	1944	9,856	22.0	Elected on count 1/8
Monetary Reform	Leix–Offaly	1948	14,369	30.3	Elected on count 1/14
Monetary Reform	Leix–Offaly	1951	11,034	23.6	Elected on count 1/8
Fine Gael	Leix–Offaly	1954	13,545	28.6	Elected on count 1/3
Fine Gael	Leix–Offaly	1957	9,747	21.8	Elected on count 1/7
Fine Gael	Laois–Offaly	1961	11,200	26.6	Elected on count 1/7
Fine Gael	Laois–Offaly	1965	12,204	28.0	Elected on count 1/4
Fine Gael	Laois–Offaly	1969	9,485	21.3	Elected on count 1/10
Fine Gael	Laois–Offaly	1973	7,415	18.3	Elected on count 1/11
Fine Gael	Laois–Offaly	1977	8,205	14.1	Elected on count 5/9
Fine Gael	Laois–Offaly	1981	9,177	16.4	Elected on count 3/7
Fine Gael	Laois–Offaly	February 1982	7,252	13.5	Elected on count 8/8
Fine Gael	Laois–Offaly	November 1982	8,428	15.3	Elected on count 4/7

== Political views ==
Flanagan's political career combined assiduous constituency service with a series of shifting, and at times contradictory, ideological positions over more than four decades in the Dáil. He has generally been characterised by historians as a populist and, in his early career, an anti-establishment figure whose monetary reform platform gave way after 1945 to a politics centred overwhelmingly on local representation. In later life, he was best known as an uncompromising social conservative and defender of Catholic teaching on sexual morality, a reputation he embraced, once describing himself as "a conservative in and on all things" who answered "only to God" on moral questions.

=== Antisemitism and the far right ===
Flanagan's early career was shaped by the antisemitic and anti-Masonic conspiracy theories of the Irish Monetary Reform Association, which held that Ireland's economic difficulties stemmed from control of the banking system by "Jewish-Masonic bankers". His maiden Dáil speech in July 1943, and a further intervention in 1947 calling for Ireland to be protected "from the influence and destruction of aliens and Jews", have been cited by historians among the most extreme expressions of antisemitism in the history of the Oireachtas.

Flanagan's wartime rhetoric went beyond antisemitic conspiracy theory to open personal sympathy for Nazi Germany. Addressing a public meeting in Mountrath in December 1942, he declared that he agreed with "ninety-nine and a half per cent" of Hitler's policies and expressed the hope that the German dictator would "knock the stuffing out of the Jews, the Americans and John Bull". From late 1943, he also cultivated associations with members of the fascist party Ailtirí na hAiséirghe and other figures on the pro-Axis fringe of Irish politics, connections that had largely lapsed by the end of the Second World War. On news of Hitler's death in 1945, Flanagan interjected in the Dáil, "I hope he is alive".

In later life, Flanagan attributed his wartime statements to a naive acceptance of contemporary international propaganda. Historians and journalists have nonetheless continued to rank him among the most prominent antisemitic figures in 20th-century Irish public life. His son Charles has said that his father had not grasped, at the time, the scale of the atrocities then being carried out against European Jews, and that Charles himself built a record of engagement with the Jewish community in Ireland, including attending Holocaust memorial events.

=== Nationalism and social conservatism ===
A member of the Knights of Saint Columbanus, Flanagan was a consistent and vocal opponent of the liberalisation of Irish law on matters of sexual morality. He voted against contraceptive legislation as a government backbencher in 1974 and, as a member of the Fine Gael parliamentary party, again in 1985, on the second occasion being temporarily expelled from the party for doing so. He campaigned, unsuccessfully, against the introduction of divorce in 1986, and was a prominent figure in the 1983 campaign for a constitutional prohibition on abortion. He also opposed Ireland's membership of the European Economic Community, which he feared would bring about a "permissive society" and erode what he regarded as a distinctively Irish way of life; during the 1972 accession referendum campaign, he told the Dáil of a visit to a town near Amsterdam where streets stood deserted after half past ten at night, and said he hoped Ireland's "good old restful" character would not be lost were the country to "continentalise" itself.

His suspicion of outside influence extended to opposition to foreign ownership of Irish land, most notably in his August 1969 remarks on German buyers, and to repeated warnings, in his final years in the Dáil, against what he regarded as the excessive influence of a secularising "liberal agenda" within his own party. He was, nonetheless, remembered chiefly for a single remark, made in 1966 in reaction to The Late Late Show, that "there was no sex in Ireland before television".

=== Opposition to Garret FitzGerald and the liberal wing of Fine Gael ===
Much of Flanagan's political energy in his final two decades in the Dáil was directed against the ascendant liberal wing of Fine Gael associated with Garret FitzGerald. The two first clashed publicly in 1968, when FitzGerald demanded Flanagan's resignation over his remarks on German landowners, and again later that year in a separate row over political patronage, after Flanagan suggested a Fine Gael government in office would favour its own members and supporters for jobs at the state's disposal. On both occasions, party leader Liam Cosgrave sided with FitzGerald, a pattern that Flanagan resented for the remainder of his career. Although Flanagan, as Father of the Dáil, formally proposed FitzGerald's nomination as Taoiseach in 1981, relations between the two deteriorated sharply during the 1983 campaign for a constitutional amendment on abortion, when Flanagan accused FitzGerald of reneging on commitments made before the 1981 and February 1982 elections and, on at least one occasion, referred to him as "Herod". The journalist Vincent Browne, writing at the height of the controversy, suggested that Flanagan's hostility towards FitzGerald was driven as much by personal animus, including grievances dating back to the 1968 disputes, as by policy disagreement.

== Legacy ==
A memorial to Flanagan was unveiled in Mountmellick in October 2005, attended by more than 300 people, including his widow, May, and the then Fine Gael leader Enda Kenny, who said that although he did not share many of Flanagan's views, he endorsed his belief that the heart of politics lay in local representation. He has since been described by one pair of journalists as "one of the cutest of cute hoors in the history of the Dáil", a characterisation reflecting his enduring reputation, for admirers and critics alike, as a singularly effective constituency operator.

Assessments of Flanagan's career by contemporaries in journalism were frequently scathing. On his appointment to Cabinet in December 1976, the Fianna Fáil TD David Andrews dismissed him as "the clown prince of the coalition", while one correspondent in the Dáil press gallery said he intended to tell television viewers that evening, "folks, we have reached a new low". Writing in 1983, Vincent Browne described Flanagan's later Dáil speeches as "long winded, jumbled, entirely unresearched and of interest solely in terms of the performance they entail", while acknowledging the effectiveness of his constituency work. Historians have been similarly severe in their assessment of his early career: Michael Loughman has described Flanagan as the "foremost embodiment of right-wing populist, anti-establishment politics" to have sat in the Dáil. The essayist Hubert Butler wrote that he was personally motivated by Flanagan's antisemitism to go out and save Jewish refugees from Nazi-occupied Vienna in defiance of Irish government policy.

In October 2026, a memorial event marking the 50th anniversary of the Garryhinch bombing was held near Portarlington, attended by relatives of the injured gardaí and by Charles Flanagan, who described the attack, intended for his father, as a "deliberate attempt to kill members of An Garda Síochána" during "very dark days in Ireland".

== Personal life ==
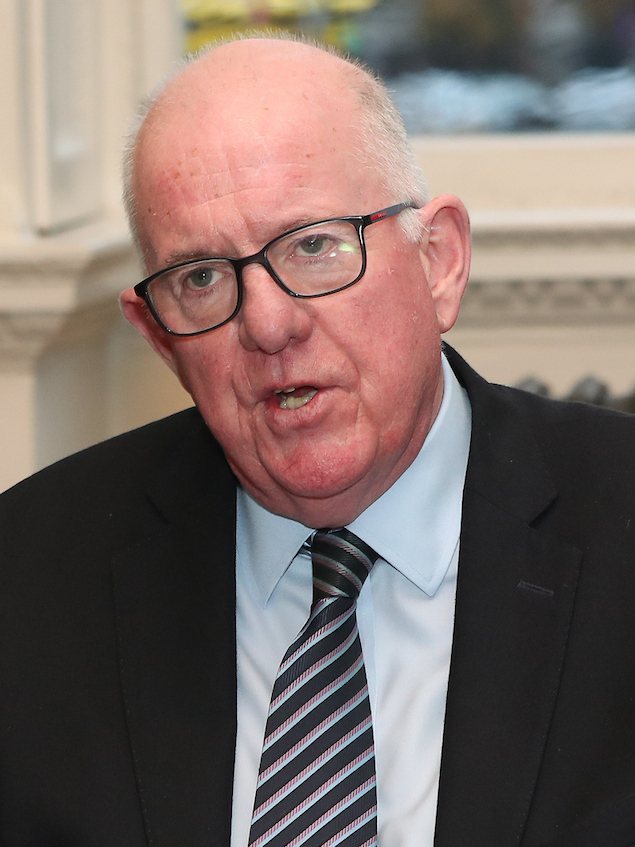
Oliver's son Charles became a prominent politician in his own right.

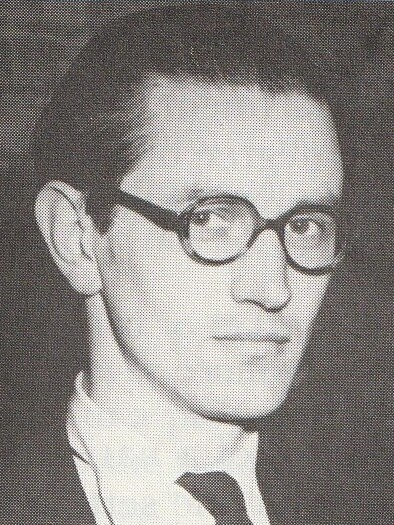
Noël Browne

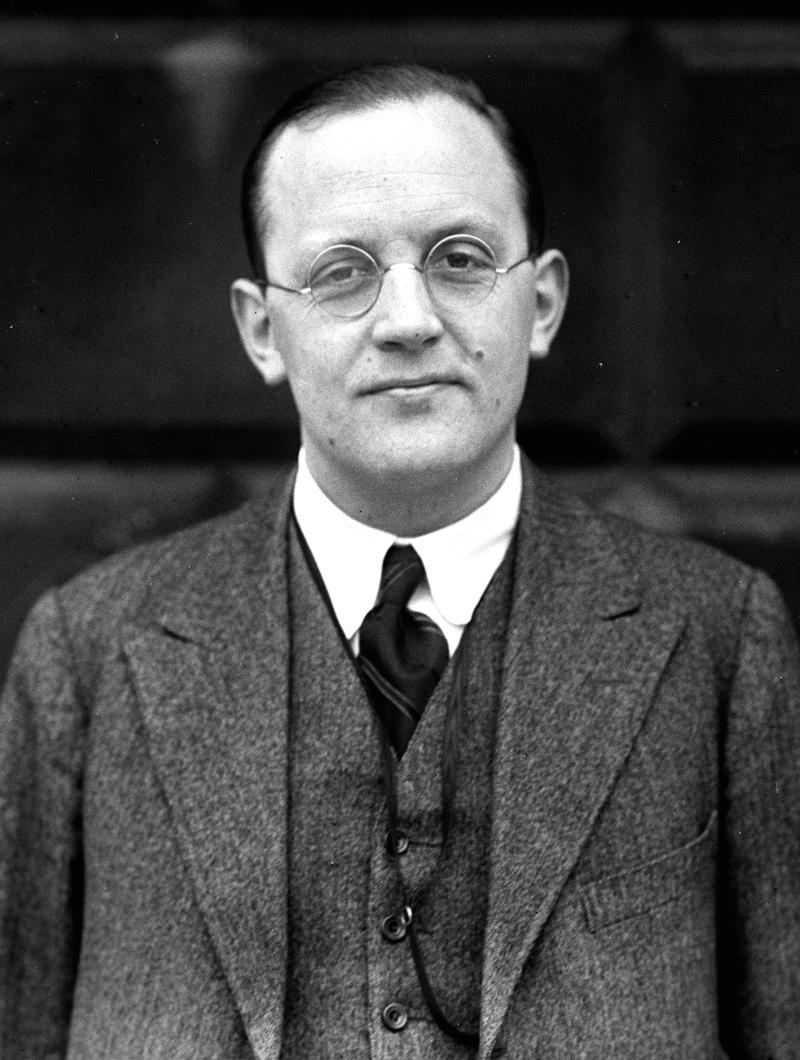
James Dillon

Flanagan formed ideologically unlikely friendships during his career with the socialist Noël Browne and the liberal James Dillon, a vocal critic of Hitler and Nazism during the Second World War.

Flanagan married May McWey in 1952; the couple had a son, Charles, and three daughters. Charles Flanagan succeeded his father as Fine Gael TD for Laois–Offaly in 1987 and went on to serve as Minister for Justice and Minister for Foreign Affairs. He has described his father as "a controversial figure" with whom he "disagreed with much of what he stood for", while stressing that this did not interfere with "what was a hugely loving relationship". As a public representative, Charles has used his career to build relations with Ireland's Jewish community and to speak out against antisemitism, including addressing Holocaust memorial events and attending meetings of the Oireachtas Friends of Israel, efforts he has presented as a deliberate counterpoint to his father's record on the issue.

Alongside his political career, Flanagan built a successful auctioneering business based in Mountmellick. He was widely regarded as an assiduous constituency representative, known for carrying a notebook in which he recorded requests from constituents as they were made to him, and for writing directly to civil servants, rather than to ministers, on their behalf. He suffered a period of tuberculosis earlier in his career, during which he was visited in hospital by Noël Browne.

Despite significant ideological differences, Flanagan enjoyed, at times, close friendships with James Dillon and Noël Browne. Dillon, who had broken with Fine Gael in 1942 over his support for the Allied war effort and sat for a decade as an independent TD, had repeatedly denounced Nazism in the Dáil during the war, at one point describing it as "the devil himself with twentieth-century efficiency". Despite having criticised Dillon directly in his own maiden speech, and having at one point branded him the "greatest hypocrite" in the Dáil, Flanagan developed a close political friendship with him after both men became apart of Fine Gael in 1952, a bond that may have been eased by their shared earlier experience as independents outside the mainstream parties. Dillon took an early interest in mentoring the less experienced deputy, at one point advising him to preface his remarks with "would the Minister not agree" after Flanagan was repeatedly ruled out of order for making speeches rather than putting questions. It was Dillon who brought Flanagan into government as Parliamentary Secretary to the Minister for Agriculture in 1954, who placed him on the Fine Gael front bench in 1958, and who later interceded with Liam Cosgrave to secure Flanagan's 1975 appointment as Parliamentary Secretary to the Minister for Local Government, a position that made him eligible for a ministerial pension. The closeness of the relationship led the Fianna Fáil minister Seán MacEntee to describe Flanagan as Dillon's "political love-child".

Browne, a lifelong socialist, was notorious in Irish politics for his difficult interpersonal relations and his quickness to fall into feuds with other politicians, and thus any politician considered his friend was notably against the grain of his character. At the height of the Mother and Child Scheme controversy in 1951, Flanagan defended Browne as "the best Minister for Health in any Government in Europe".

In poor health in his final months, Flanagan nonetheless insisted on attending the Dáil for an adjournment vote in December 1986, declining a pair despite his condition. He died in County Laois on 26 April 1987, two months after declining to contest that February's general election.

== See also ==
- Families in the Oireachtas
- History of the Jews in Ireland

== Notes ==
Political offices
Preceded by Gerald Bartley	Parliamentary Secretary to the Minister for Agriculture; 1954–1957	Office abolished
Preceded by Michael Begley	Parliamentary Secretary to the Minister for Local Government; 1975–1976	Succeeded by Patrick J. Reynolds
Preceded by Liam Cosgrave (acting)	Minister for Defence; 1976–1977	Succeeded by Bobby Molloy
Honorary titles
Preceded by A. P. Byrne	Baby of the Dáil; 1943–1948	Succeeded by Neil Blaney
Preceded by Liam Cosgrave	Father of the Dáil; 1981–1987	Succeeded by Neil Blaney

Dáil	Election	Deputy (Party)	Deputy (Party)	Deputy (Party)	Deputy (Party)	Deputy (Party)
2nd	1921	Joseph Lynch (SF)	Patrick McCartan (SF)	Francis Bulfin (SF)	Kevin O'Higgins (SF)	4 seats 1921–1923
3rd	1922	William Davin (Lab)	Patrick McCartan (PT-SF)	Francis Bulfin (PT-SF)	Kevin O'Higgins (PT-SF)	4 seats 1921–1923
4th	1923	William Davin (Lab)	Laurence Brady (Rep)	Francis Bulfin (CnaG)	Patrick Egan (CnaG)	Seán McGuinness (Rep)
4th	1926 by-election	William Davin (Lab)	Laurence Brady (Rep)	Francis Bulfin (CnaG)	Patrick Egan (CnaG)	James Dwyer (CnaG)
5th	1927 (Jun)	William Davin (Lab)	Patrick Boland (FF)	Thomas Tynan (FF)	John Gill (Lab)	James Dwyer (CnaG)
6th	1927 (Sep)	William Davin (Lab)	Patrick Boland (FF)	Patrick Gorry (FF)	William Aird (CnaG)	James Dwyer (CnaG)
7th	1932	William Davin (Lab)	Patrick Boland (FF)	Patrick Gorry (FF)	Thomas F. O'Higgins (CnaG)	Eugene O'Brien (CnaG)
8th	1933	William Davin (Lab)	Patrick Boland (FF)	Eamon Donnelly (FF)	Thomas F. O'Higgins (CnaG)	Jack Finlay (NCP)
9th	1937	William Davin (Lab)	Patrick Boland (FF)	Patrick Gorry (FF)	Thomas F. O'Higgins (FG)	Jack Finlay (FG)
10th	1938	William Davin (Lab)	Patrick Boland (FF)	Patrick Gorry (FF)	Thomas F. O'Higgins (FG)	Daniel Hogan (FF)
11th	1943	William Davin (Lab)	Patrick Boland (FF)	Patrick Gorry (FF)	Thomas F. O'Higgins (FG)	Oliver J. Flanagan (IMR)
12th	1944	William Davin (Lab)	Patrick Boland (FF)	Patrick Gorry (FF)	Thomas F. O'Higgins (FG)	Oliver J. Flanagan (IMR)
13th	1948	William Davin (Lab)	Patrick Boland (FF)	Patrick Gorry (FF)	Tom O'Higgins, Jnr (FG)	Oliver J. Flanagan (Ind.)
14th	1951	William Davin (Lab)	Patrick Boland (FF)	Peadar Maher (FF)	Tom O'Higgins, Jnr (FG)	Oliver J. Flanagan (Ind.)
15th	1954	William Davin (Lab)	Nicholas Egan (FF)	Peadar Maher (FF)	Tom O'Higgins, Jnr (FG)	Oliver J. Flanagan (FG)
15th	1956 by-election	Kieran Egan (FF)	Nicholas Egan (FF)	Peadar Maher (FF)	Tom O'Higgins, Jnr (FG)	Oliver J. Flanagan (FG)
16th	1957	Kieran Egan (FF)	Nicholas Egan (FF)	Peadar Maher (FF)	Tom O'Higgins, Jnr (FG)	Oliver J. Flanagan (FG)
17th	1961	Kieran Egan (FF)	Nicholas Egan (FF)	Patrick Lalor (FF)	Tom O'Higgins, Jnr (FG)	Oliver J. Flanagan (FG)
18th	1965	Henry Byrne (Lab)	Nicholas Egan (FF)	Patrick Lalor (FF)	Tom O'Higgins, Jnr (FG)	Oliver J. Flanagan (FG)
19th	1969	Ger Connolly (FF)	Bernard Cowen (FF)	Patrick Lalor (FF)	Tom Enright (FG)	Oliver J. Flanagan (FG)
20th	1973	Ger Connolly (FF)	Charles McDonald (FG)	Patrick Lalor (FF)	Tom Enright (FG)	Oliver J. Flanagan (FG)
21st	1977	Ger Connolly (FF)	Bernard Cowen (FF)	Patrick Lalor (FF)	Tom Enright (FG)	Oliver J. Flanagan (FG)
22nd	1981	Ger Connolly (FF)	Bernard Cowen (FF)	Liam Hyland (FF)	Tom Enright (FG)	Oliver J. Flanagan (FG)
23rd	1982 (Feb)	Ger Connolly (FF)	Bernard Cowen (FF)	Liam Hyland (FF)	Tom Enright (FG)	Oliver J. Flanagan (FG)
24th	1982 (Nov)	Ger Connolly (FF)	Bernard Cowen (FF)	Liam Hyland (FF)	Tom Enright (FG)	Oliver J. Flanagan (FG)
24th	1984 by-election	Ger Connolly (FF)	Brian Cowen (FF)	Liam Hyland (FF)	Tom Enright (FG)	Oliver J. Flanagan (FG)
25th	1987	Ger Connolly (FF)	Brian Cowen (FF)	Liam Hyland (FF)	Tom Enright (FG)	Charles Flanagan (FG)
26th	1989	Ger Connolly (FF)	Brian Cowen (FF)	Liam Hyland (FF)	Tom Enright (FG)	Charles Flanagan (FG)
27th	1992	Ger Connolly (FF)	Brian Cowen (FF)	Liam Hyland (FF)	Pat Gallagher (Lab)	Charles Flanagan (FG)
28th	1997	John Moloney (FF)	Brian Cowen (FF)	Seán Fleming (FF)	Tom Enright (FG)	Charles Flanagan (FG)
29th	2002	John Moloney (FF)	Brian Cowen (FF)	Seán Fleming (FF)	Olwyn Enright (FG)	Tom Parlon (PDs)
30th	2007	John Moloney (FF)	Brian Cowen (FF)	Seán Fleming (FF)	Olwyn Enright (FG)	Charles Flanagan (FG)
31st	2011	Brian Stanley (SF)	Barry Cowen (FF)	Seán Fleming (FF)	Marcella Corcoran Kennedy (FG)	Charles Flanagan (FG)
32nd	2016	Constituency abolished. See Laois and Offaly.				
33rd	2020	Brian Stanley (SF)	Barry Cowen (FF)	Seán Fleming (FF)	Carol Nolan (Ind.)	Charles Flanagan (FG)
33rd	2024	Brian Stanley (SF)	(Vacant)	Seán Fleming (FF)	Carol Nolan (Ind.)	Charles Flanagan (FG)
34th	2024	Constituency abolished. See Laois and Offaly.				
