= Electoral history of Charles Haughey =

The Irish politician and former Taoiseach Charles Haughey contested numerous elections during his four-decade career.

== Local government ==
After being co-opted to a seat on Dublin Corporation in 1953, Haughey lost re-election in the Dublin No. 1 district at the 1955 Irish local elections.

== Dáil Éireann ==
Elections to the Dáil
Party	Election		FPv	FPv%	Result
Fianna Fáil	Dublin North-East	1951	1,629	3.5	Eliminated on count 6/10
Fianna Fáil	Dublin North-East	1954	1,812	3.8	Eliminated on count 8/13
Fianna Fáil	Dublin North-East	1956 By-Election	13,950	43.5	Eliminated on count 1/1
Fianna Fáil	Dublin North-East	1957	4,168	10.3	Elected on count 10/10
Fianna Fáil	Dublin North-East	1961	8,566	20.2	Elected on count 1/9
Fianna Fáil	Dublin North-East	1965	12,415	23.7	Elected on count 1/10
Fianna Fáil	Dublin North-East	1969	11,677	31.5	Elected on count 1/11
Fianna Fáil	Dublin North-East	1973	12,901	30.1	Elected on count 1/7
Fianna Fáil	Dublin Artane	1977	11,041	36.7	Elected on count 1/12
Fianna Fáil	Dublin North-Central	1981	17,637	43.5	Elected on count 1/11
Fianna Fáil	Dublin North-Central	Feb 1982	16,143	39.6	Elected on count 1/11
Fianna Fáil	Dublin North-Central	Nov 1982	14,516	35.9	Elected on count 1/8
Fianna Fáil	Dublin North-Central	1987	12,986	30.3	Elected on count 1/10
Fianna Fáil	Dublin North-Central	1989	9,105	23.8	Elected on count 1/9

== As Fianna Fáil leader ==
Election	Leader	FPv	FPv%	±	Seats	±	Dáil	Government
1981	Charles Haughey	777,616	45.3 (#1)	▼5.3	78 / 166	▼6 (Note: The overall size of the Dáil increased from 148 to 166 members at this election, so this is not a like-for-like change.)	22nd	Opposition; 17th government (FG-Lab minority)
Feb. 1982	Charles Haughey	786,951	47.3 (#1)	▲2.0	81 / 166	▲3	23rd	Government; 18th government (FF minority)
Nov. 1982	Charles Haughey	763,313	45.2 (#1)	▼2.1	75 / 166	▼6	24th	Opposition; 19th government (FG-Lab majority)
1987	Charles Haughey	784,547	44.1 (#1)	▼1.1	81 / 166	▲6	25th	Government; 20th government (FF minority)
1989	Charles Haughey	731,472	44.1 (#1)	Steady	77 / 166	▼4	26th	Government; 21st, 22nd government (FF-PD majority)
