= Prosperity Bonus =

One-time payment to Albrtans in 2006

Alberta's Prosperity Bonus, nicknamed Ralph bucks after then-premier Ralph Klein, was a one-time $400 payment paid out to almost 3 million Albertan residents in 2006. The Government of Alberta paid a dividend to residents of Alberta due to a massive oil-fuelled provincial budget surplus.

== Background - 2004 general election ==
Notice for Klein's prosperity bonus would come less than a year following the 2004 Alberta general election which saw the Progressive Conservative Party of Alberta elected for the tenth consecutive majority government, and Klein continuing as Premier for the fourth straight term. Despite retaining power in Alberta, the election revealed weakness in the popularity of Premier Klein and the Progressive Conservative Party. Their share of the popular vote dropped from 61.9% in 2001 to 46.8%.

== Prosperity bonus announcement ==
In September 2005, Alberta Premier Ralph Klein announced in an open letter to Albertans that the province was expecting significant higher than expected revenue from energy royalties and the government would be creating a program to return a portion of the surplus to Albertans in the form of a one-time CA$400 payment sometime in January 2006. Previous government estimates had placed the 2005-06 budget surplus as $2.8-billion, however rising oil and gas prices had inflated this number to approximately $6.8-billion. The prosperity bonuses would total approximately $1.4-billion or 20 percent of the province's $6.8-billion surplus. The remainder of the $5.4-billion was allocated to other projects in the province. Prosperity bonuses were not subject to taxation by either the federal or provincial governments.

The prosperity bonus cheques were commonly referred to as Ralph Bucks which was coined by Calgary Sun columnists Rick Bell and Chris Nelson after searching for a term to describe the payment.

After the announcement Klein left the door open for the possibility of annual prosperity cheques similar to the annual dividends provided by the government of Alaska through the Alaska Permanent Fund since 1982.

== One-time issue of cheques ==
Cheques were received by almost 3 million Albertans in 2006. However no further cheques were sent out. Klein resigned as premier later that same year, on December 14, 2006.

== Eligibility ==
All Albertans who were residents of the province as of September 1, 2005, and filed a 2004 tax return with the Canada Revenue Agency received the bonus, except for prisoners, who did not qualify. Cheques for Albertans under 18 years of age were payable only to their primary caregiver (the mother in most cases), thus leaving parents to determine how their children's share was to be distributed or used. Homeless Albertans also qualified—the government pledged to work with inner-city agencies to ensure that the homeless receive their money. Other questions were unanswered. For example, it was unknown how spouses fleeing abusive relationships would receive their bonus if they were housed in a shelter.

== Public opinion ==
The program generated controversy both inside and outside Alberta. Few Albertans turned down their cheques, and a vast majority were glad for it.

Some residents criticized what they saw as a pointless giveaway, and preferred to see the excess money put toward long-term benefits such as tax cuts or the abolition of health care premiums.

Ralph Bucks made it into national media after a handful of non-Albertans came forward to admit they had received cheques to which they were not entitled, prompting criticism from the Canadian Taxpayers Federation.

Following the prosperity bonus program, some Albertans dropped their approval of the cheque program. They began viewing the $400 cheques negatively in light of falling oil and gas prices in 2008, and again in the 2010s, which led to growing provincial debt and deficits in following years.

ATB Financial's Economist Todd Hirsch stated publicly his opinion that the government "missed some great opportunities to invest in our post-secondary education systems."

== See also ==
- Alaska Permanent Fund
- Alberta Heritage Savings Trust Fund
- Prosperity certificate - a similar dividend paid by earlier Social Credit governments in Alberta
