= Social Credit Party (Ireland) =

Defunct Irish political party

Irish Social Credit Party
- Founder: Maud Gonne
- Founded: 1932; 94 years ago
- Dissolved: 1940; 86 years ago
- Headquarters: Gardiner Street, Dublin
- Ideology: Social Credit economics

The Irish Social Credit Party was a political party active in the Irish Free State. Founded as the Financial Freedom Federation in 1932, it was renamed in 1935.

== History ==
Formed in 1932 as the Financial Freedom Federation (FFF), it became the Irish Social Credit Party in late 1935. The party sought to reform Ireland's financial and economic system on lines consistent with the social credit economics as espoused by Major C. H. Douglas. The FFF had split in two factions: one operating under the banner of the Financial Freedom Federation and the other under the banner of the Financial Freedom Federation of Ireland.

A list of the party's executive committee member submitted to the 1934 Banking Commission includes Maud Gonne MacBride and Josephine Fitzgerald. As of 1936, the Party's headquarters was based in Gardiner Street, Dublin.

In the Irish Independent in 1936, Gonne criticised Ernest Blythe's denunciation of social credit economics. She wrote: "I read with amazement the report of Mr. Blythe's broadcast attack on Social Credit. Major Douglas's contention that production has outstripped distribution with disastrous results of unemployment and starvation, tending to war and anarchy is uncontrovertible, and is apparent to all in the desperate scramble for markets, the restriction of output and destruction in almost every country of consumable goods, while millions of people who need these goods are allowed to starve."

Along with Gonne, other notable names on the party's executive committee of the organisation were those of Patrick Lenihan and former captain of the British army, Henry Neville Roberts. Former chief organiser of the IRB in Ulster, Seamus Dobbyn, presided as president for most of the decade. When the movement was revived under a different moniker in the 1940s, it was led by James Lennon, from Carlow, who had been elected as a TD to the first Dáil in 1919.

The party went into decline by the late 1930s and it had become confused in the public mind with the Communist Party of Ireland. An example of this was at a public meeting of the party at the Gloucester Diamond, Dublin in April 1936. Before the meeting could commence, an angry anti-Communist mob, seemingly provoked by a party banner exclaiming ‘social justice through Social Credit’, smashed the platform and destroyed books and literature before launching missiles, including cabbage stalks at party members, including Gonne.

In 1941, Denis Ireland published Éamon de Valera Doesn’t See it Through: A Study of Irish Politics in the Machine Age, in which he defended Douglas's distributive philosophy. "Social credit" or "national dividend" payments to citizens were essential to redress the otherwise chronic lag in "the machine-age" between their capacity to consume and the "productive capacity" of industry. In a "world of artificial scarcity" the alternative, he suggested, was fascism. Ireland's position with regard to the Social Credit party, however, is unclear. In 1948, he entered the Seanad Éireann for Clann na Poblachta, the republican and broadly social-democratic party of Maud Gonne's son, Seán MacBride, making him the first Northern Ireland resident to serve in the Oireachtas.
