= 1934 Irish local elections =

Nationwide local authority elections

← 1928	June 1934	1942 →

All councillors across the Irish Free State
	First party	Second party
Party	Fianna Fáil	Fine Gael
	Third party
Party	Labour

The 1934 Irish local elections were held in most of the counties, cities and towns of Ireland in 1934. Excepted were some in Dublin city and county, which had held elections in June 1933. The election was the first test for Fine Gael, which had been formed in September 1933. Fianna Fáil won majorities in fifteen councils while Fine Gael won majorities in eight.

== Results ==
Party	Seats	±	First pref. votes	% FPV	±%
Fianna Fáil	728				
Fine Gael	596				
Labour	185				
Independent, Sinn Féin and others	371				
Total	1,880			100	—

== Detailed results ==
Authority	FF	FG	Lab	Ind	Other	Total	Result	Details
Kildare	10	12	7	0	0	29	No overall control	Details
Sligo	9	18	0	1	0	28	Fine Gael	
Sligo Corporation	4	0	4	16	0	24	No overall control	
Totals								

== See also ==
- Local government in the Republic of Ireland
