= Prosperity certificate =

Certificates introduced in Alberta, Canada, in 1936

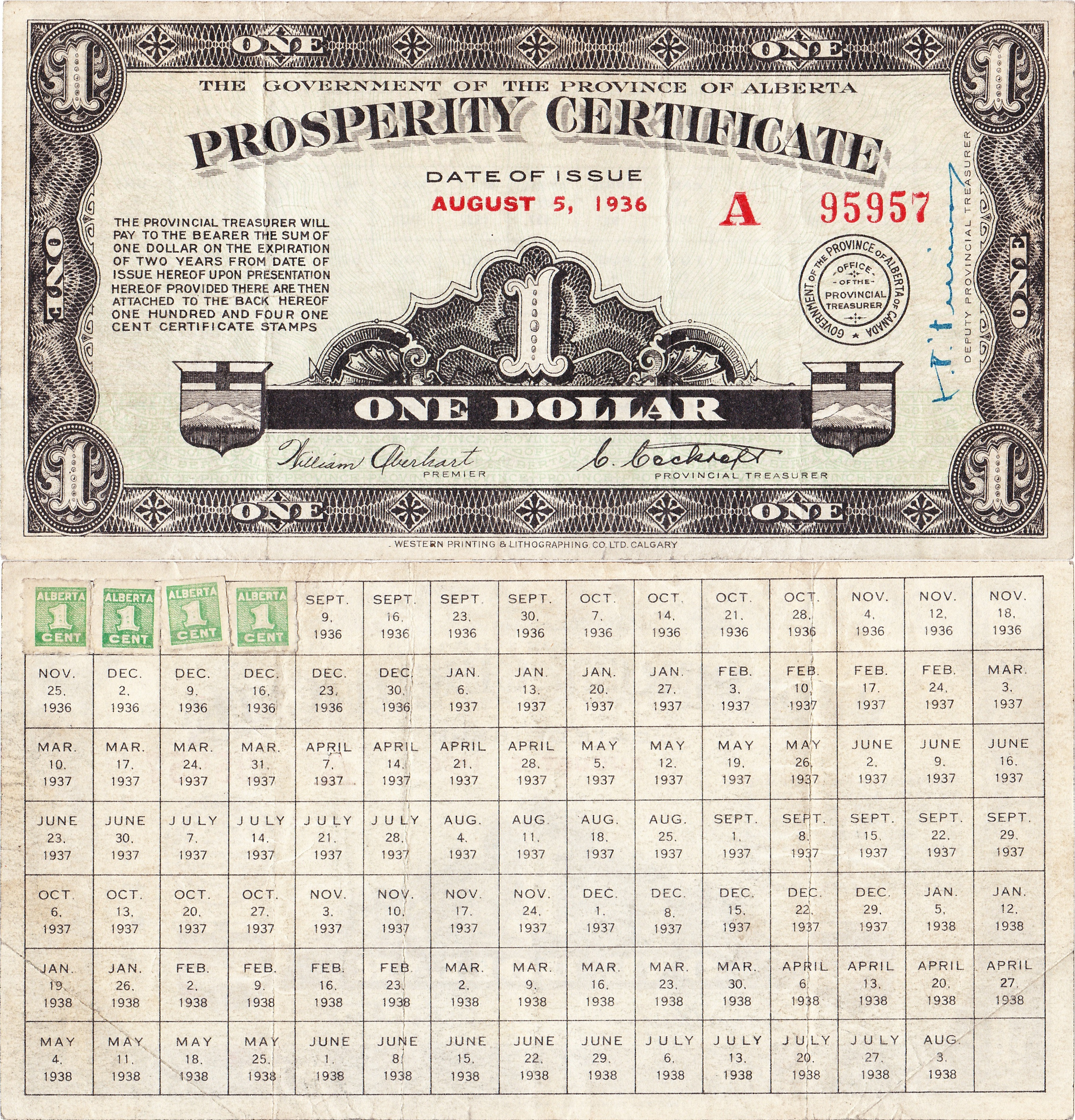
A prosperity certificate.

In 1936, the Alberta Social Credit Party–led government of Alberta, Canada, introduced prosperity certificates (also known as velocity dollars) in an attempt to alleviate the effects of the Great Depression. Premier William Aberhart's government had won power in the 1935 provincial election partly on the scheme.

At the height of the Great Depression, the town government in Vermilion started paying its employees in scrip. Prosperity certificates originated as a province-wide extension to this local program across Alberta.

The certificates were not issued to the general public as Aberhart had promised in his election platform but instead were used to pay relief workers on provincial public works projects and were put into circulation via special agreements with municipalities.

Although not technically money, each certificate was marked with a value of one dollar, and redeemable for $1 at the end of its life or on certain dates during the course of the program. Other certificates were in the amount of $5. $239,000 worth of scrip was issued in August 1936.

A goal of the program was to encourage spending and circulation of the spending power. To achieve this, hoarding of the certificates was discouraged by requiring the holder to affix to the back of a certificate a 1¢ stamp every week for the certificate to maintain its validity. Thus people were encouraged to spend whatever certificates they had each week, to avoid having to make too many payments of the one-percent tax. As the program intended, possessors of the certificates tried to avoid having to purchase and affix the stamps, by spending the certificates before the week's validity expired. This stamp scrip, innovated by Silvio Gesell, was not part of the theories of Aberhart's mentor, social credit founder Major C. H. Douglas.

The hassle and expense of the stamps made the certificates unpopular with the public. The tiny gummed postage-style stamps (smaller than 1 cm^{2} (0.16 sq in)) were prone to falling off.

Another issue was finding a seller who would accept the unusual currency. The Army & Navy Stores, a chain of department stores, accepted the currency when some other merchants would not. Oddly, the currency was not accepted by the government itself for payment of taxes.

The notes were intended to be redeemed after two years of issue, when 104 stamps would have been affixed. However, the program was cancelled after only about one year. The notes could be returned to the government for redeeming in Canadian currency.

Alberta's prosperity certificates have never been listed in the Standard Catalog of World Paper Money.

== See also ==
- Demurrage currency
- Local currency
- Prosperity Bonus, also nicknamed Ralph bucks, a 2006 $400 dividend to every Albertan
