= Patrick Lenihan =

Irish politician (1902–1970)

Teachta Dála
- In office April 1965 – 11 March 1970
- Constituency: Longford–Westmeath

Personal details
- Born: 4 September 1902 Ennistymon, County Clare, Ireland
- Died: 11 March 1970 (aged 67) Dublin, Ireland
- Party: Fianna Fáil
- Spouse: Anne Scanlon (m. 1925)
- Relations: Brian Lenihan Jnr (grandson); Conor Lenihan (grandson); Feargal O'Rourke (grandson)
- Children: 4, including Brian and Mary
- Education: University College Galway

Military service
- Allegiance: Irish Republican Army
- Years of service: 1919–1922
- Battles/wars: Irish War of Independence

Patrick James Lenihan (4 September 1902 – 11 March 1970) was an Irish Fianna Fáil politician who served as a Teachta Dála (TD) for the Longford–Westmeath constituency from 1965 to 1970.

He held the distinction of being the only parent to be elected to the Oireachtas when his child was already a member.

== Early life ==
He was born 4 September 1902 in Ennistymon, County Clare, son of Patrick Lenihan, a teacher, and Hannah Lenihan (née McIherney). He was educated at Garbally College, Ballinasloe, and University College Galway, he graduated a year late because of his involvement with the IRA during the Irish War of Independence. Following graduation he taught at Christian Brothers' schools in Belfast for two years.

He was an Inspector of Taxes in Dundalk, County Louth, before being appointed by Seán Lemass to run the Gentex textiles company in Athlone. At its height it was the major employer in the Midlands. He also was involved for some years in the Hodson Bay Hotel on Lough Ree, and was instrumental in the establishment of the All-Ireland amateur drama festival. In the 1930s, he served on the executive committee of the Irish Social Credit Party, fellow members of which included Maud Gonne.

He also had some success as a hurler with Westmeath during the 1930s. He won a Leinster Junior Hurling Championship and an All-Ireland Junior Hurling Championship in 1936. The following year he played in (to date) Westmeath's only Leinster Senior Hurling Championship final, in which they lost out to Kilkenny.

== Politics ==
In the mid-1930s, Lenihan was a member of the executive of the Social Credit Party of Ireland.

Lenihan was elected as a Fianna Fáil TD at his first attempt, for the Longford–Westmeath constituency at the 1965 general election. He beat the long-serving Fine Gael TD Seán Mac Eoin in the famous "long count", by thirteen votes. His son Brian Lenihan had been elected in the neighbouring constituency of Roscommon in 1961, at the previous election. It was the first, and to date only, occasion of a child preceding his parent into the Dáil. Patrick Lenihan was re-elected to the Dáil at the 1969 general election and died suddenly in 1970. His seat was taken at the subsequent by-election by Fine Gael's Patrick Cooney.

Two of his children, Brian Lenihan Snr and Mary O'Rourke, served as cabinet ministers. A third, Paddy, served as a member of Roscommon County Council; in the later stages of his career in the 1980s, he left Fianna Fáil to join Neil Blaney's Independent Fianna Fáil. Two of Patrick Lenihan's grandchildren, Brian Lenihan Jnr and Conor Lenihan, served as Minister for Finance and Minister of State respectively in the government of Brian Cowen. Conor Lenihan and Mary O'Rourke lost their seats at the 2011 general election. Brian Lenihan Jnr was re-elected but died in June 2011, ending the Lenihans' fifty years of continuous service in the Oireachtas.

Patrick Lenihan was the only member of his family to serve in the Dáil who was not appointed a minister at some stage in his career.

== See also ==
- Families in the Oireachtas

Dáil	Election	Deputy (Party)	Deputy (Party)	Deputy (Party)	Deputy (Party)	Deputy (Party)
2nd	1921	Lorcan Robbins (SF)	Seán Mac Eoin (SF)	Joseph McGuinness (SF)	Laurence Ginnell (SF)	4 seats 1921–1923
3rd	1922	John Lyons (Lab)	Seán Mac Eoin (PT-SF)	Francis McGuinness (PT-SF)	Laurence Ginnell (AT-SF)	4 seats 1921–1923
4th	1923	John Lyons (Ind.)	Conor Byrne (Rep)	James Killane (Rep)	Patrick Shaw (CnaG)	Patrick McKenna (FP)
5th	1927 (Jun)	Henry Broderick (Lab)	Michael Kennedy (FF)	James Victory (FF)	Patrick Shaw (CnaG)	Hugh Garahan (FP)
6th	1927 (Sep)	Henry Broderick (Lab)	Michael Kennedy (FF)	James Killane (FF)	Patrick Shaw (CnaG)	Michael Connolly (CnaG)
6th	1930 by-election	Henry Broderick (Lab)	Michael Kennedy (FF)	James Geoghegan (FF)	Patrick Shaw (CnaG)	Michael Connolly (CnaG)
7th	1932	Francis Gormley (FF)	Michael Kennedy (FF)	James Geoghegan (FF)	Patrick Shaw (CnaG)	Seán Mac Eoin (CnaG)
8th	1933	James Victory (FF)	Michael Kennedy (FF)	James Geoghegan (FF)	Charles Fagan (NCP)	Seán Mac Eoin (CnaG)
9th	1937	Constituency abolished. See Athlone–Longford and Meath–Westmeath				

Dáil	Election	Deputy (Party)	Deputy (Party)	Deputy (Party)	Deputy (Party)	Deputy (Party)
13th	1948	Erskine H. Childers (FF)	Thomas Carter (FF)	Michael Kennedy (FF)	Seán Mac Eoin (FG)	Charles Fagan (Ind.)
14th	1951	Erskine H. Childers (FF)	Frank Carter (FF)	Michael Kennedy (FF)	Seán Mac Eoin (FG)	Charles Fagan (Ind.)
15th	1954	Erskine H. Childers (FF)	Frank Carter (FF)	Michael Kennedy (FF)	Seán Mac Eoin (FG)	Charles Fagan (FG)
16th	1957	Erskine H. Childers (FF)	Ruairí Ó Brádaigh (SF)	Michael Kennedy (FF)	Seán Mac Eoin (FG)	Charles Fagan (FG)
17th	1961	Frank Carter (FF)	Joe Sheridan (Ind.)	Michael Kennedy (FF)	Seán Mac Eoin (FG)	4 seats 1961–1992
18th	1965	Frank Carter (FF)	Joe Sheridan (Ind.)	Patrick Lenihan (FF)	Gerry L'Estrange (FG)	4 seats 1961–1992
19th	1969	Frank Carter (FF)	Joe Sheridan (Ind.)	Patrick Lenihan (FF)	Gerry L'Estrange (FG)	4 seats 1961–1992
19th	1970 by-election	Frank Carter (FF)	Joe Sheridan (Ind.)	Patrick Cooney (FG)	Gerry L'Estrange (FG)	4 seats 1961–1992
20th	1973	Frank Carter (FF)	Joe Sheridan (Ind.)	Patrick Cooney (FG)	Gerry L'Estrange (FG)	4 seats 1961–1992
21st	1977	Albert Reynolds (FF)	Joe Sheridan (Ind.)	Seán Keegan (FF)	Gerry L'Estrange (FG)	4 seats 1961–1992
22nd	1981	Albert Reynolds (FF)	Patrick Cooney (FG)	Seán Keegan (FF)	Gerry L'Estrange (FG)	4 seats 1961–1992
23rd	1982 (Feb)	Albert Reynolds (FF)	Patrick Cooney (FG)	Seán Keegan (FF)	Gerry L'Estrange (FG)	4 seats 1961–1992
24th	1982 (Nov)	Albert Reynolds (FF)	Patrick Cooney (FG)	Mary O'Rourke (FF)	Gerry L'Estrange (FG)	4 seats 1961–1992
25th	1987	Albert Reynolds (FF)	Patrick Cooney (FG)	Mary O'Rourke (FF)	Henry Abbott (FF)	4 seats 1961–1992
26th	1989	Albert Reynolds (FF)	Louis Belton (FG)	Mary O'Rourke (FF)	Paul McGrath (FG)	4 seats 1961–1992
27th	1992	Constituency abolished. See Longford–Roscommon and Westmeath				

Dáil	Election	Deputy (Party)	Deputy (Party)	Deputy (Party)	Deputy (Party)	Deputy (Party)
30th	2007	Willie Penrose (Lab)	Peter Kelly (FF)	Mary O'Rourke (FF)	James Bannon (FG)	4 seats 2007–2024
31st	2011	Willie Penrose (Lab)	Robert Troy (FF)	Nicky McFadden (FG)	James Bannon (FG)	4 seats 2007–2024
31st	2014 by-election	Willie Penrose (Lab)	Robert Troy (FF)	Gabrielle McFadden (FG)	James Bannon (FG)	4 seats 2007–2024
32nd	2016	Willie Penrose (Lab)	Robert Troy (FF)	Kevin "Boxer" Moran (Ind.)	Peter Burke (FG)	4 seats 2007–2024
33rd	2020	Sorca Clarke (SF)	Robert Troy (FF)	Joe Flaherty (FF)	Peter Burke (FG)	4 seats 2007–2024
34th	2024	Sorca Clarke (SF)	Robert Troy (FF)	Kevin "Boxer" Moran (Ind.)	Peter Burke (FG)	Micheál Carrigy (FG)
