= 1945 Irish local elections =

Nationwide local authority elections

← 1942	14 June 1945	1950 →

The 1945 local elections in Ireland were held on 14 June 1945 to fill all council seats for most counties and county boroughs and municipal towns. The state was still under the Emergency of the Second World War. As a cost-saving measure, electoral law was amended to bring forward the date of the local elections a few weeks to coincide with the 1945 presidential election.

Dublin County Council and Kerry County Council had been dissolved, and no elections were held for their councils. There was no poll for six urban district councils and four town commissioners because the number of candidates did not exceed the number of seats.

== Results ==
The elections were by single transferable vote. The total valid votes cast was 1,152,691. Totals of invalid votes were not aggregated from local counts. Fianna Fáil lost votes to Independents. Prior to the 1960s, Fine Gael did not contest local elections in all areas; some of those who voted for it in Dáil elections voted at local elections for local groups including the Cork Civic Party and Limerick Progressive Party.

1945 local election results: county and county boroughs percentage / count of seats (S) and first-preference votes (V)
Council	Total		Fianna Fáil		Fine Gael		Labour		C na Talmhan		Independents and others	
Council	S	V	S	V	S	V	S	V	S	V	S	V
Cavan	25	30,327	44 / 11	45 / 13,611	0 / 0	1 / 351	0 / 0	0 / 0	12 / 3	14 / 4,361	44 / 11	40 / 12,004
Cork city	21	28,262	33 / 7	28 / 7,907	14 / 3	10 / 2,817	5 / 1	5 / 1,506	0 / 0	0 / 0	48 / 10 (Note: Includes 5 Cork Civic Party, 1 National Labour, and 1 Ailtirí na hAiséirghe.)	51 / 14,458
Galway	31	57,580	55 / 17	47 / 27,131	0 / 0	0 / 0	3 / 1	4 / 2,115	19 / 6	25 / 14,508	23 / 7	24 / 13,826
Leitrim	22	20,825	36 / 8	41 / 8,523	9 / 3	21 / 4,338	0 / 0	0 / 0	13 / 4	16 / 3,378	22 / 7	24 / 5,070
Limerick city	15		53 / 8		0 / 0		7 / 1		0 / 0		47 / 7 (Note: Includes 2 Gluais Linn, 2 Progressive Party, and 1 National Labour.)	
Mayo	31	56,166	52 / 16	46 / 25,969	13 / 4	15 / 8,661	0 / 0	0 / 187	26 / 8	30 / 17,115	10 / 3 (Note: Includes 1 Independent Republican.)	8 / 4,234
Meath	29	23,916	48 / 14	49 / 11,832	3 / 1	5 / 1,263	10 / 3	13 / 3,159	7 / 2	5 / 1,328	31 / 9 (Note: Includes 1 Old IRA and 1 National Labour.)	26 / 6,334
Monaghan	20	24,957	55 / 11	52 / 13,056	0 / 0	0 / 0	0 / 0	0 / 0	10 / 2	13 / 2,942	35 / 7 (Note: Includes 3 Monaghan Protestant Association)	36 / 8,959
Offaly	21	19,819	43 / 9		19 / 4		10 / 2		10 / 2		19 / 4 (Note: Includes 1 Monetary Reform)	
Roscommon	26	32,986	54 / 14	53 / 17,545	0 / 0	0 / 0	0 / 0	0 / 0	38 / 10	37 / 12,104	8 / 2	10 / 3,337
Sligo	24	25,948	38 / 9	32 / 8,398	38 / 9	43 / 11,214	4 / 1	2 / 633	8 / 2	10 / 2,692	13 / 3	12 / 3,011
Tipperary North	21	24,690	48 / 10	46 / 11,256	19 / 5	21 / 5,270	10 / 2	18 / 4,422	0 / 0	0 / 0	19 / 4 (Note: Includes 1 National Labour.)	23 / 5,705
Westmeath	23	21,261	39 / 9	39 / 8,298	0 / 0	0 / 0	22 / 5	18 / 3,804	0 / 0	0 / 0	39 / 9	43 / 9,159
