= 1950 Irish local elections =

Nationwide local authority elections

← 1945	20 September 1950	1955 →

Elections were held on 20 September 1950 for the councils of most of the counties, cities and towns of the Republic of Ireland.

The exceptions were three councils which had been elected in 1948: Dublin County Council and Kerry County Council, which were reinstated in 1948 after earlier suspension; and in Tramore, which gained town commissioners in 1948 for the first time. Bad weather on 20 September prevented election officials reaching the islands of Inishbofin, Inishmeane, Owey and Tory in County Donegal, so polling was held there on a later date.

== Results ==
Party	Seats	±	First pref. votes	% FPV	±%
Fianna Fáil					
Fine Gael					
Clann na Talmhan					
Clann na Poblachta					
Labour					
Independent and others					
Total				100	—
