= 1942 Irish local elections =

Nationwide local authority elections

← 1934	19 August 1942	1945 →

The 1942 Irish local elections were held in all the counties, cities and towns of Ireland on 19 August 1942, during The Emergency.

== Results ==
Party	Votes	±	% VOTES	±%
Fianna Fáil	110,089		39.7%	
Independent and others	85,248		27.3%	
Fine Gael	44,441		14.4%	
Clann na Talmhan	30,472		9.9%	
Labour	23,863		7.7%	
Farmers' Party	9,492		3.1%	
Total	303,635		100	—
