= 1955 Irish local elections =

Nationwide local authority elections

← 1950	1955	1960 →

The 1955 Irish local elections were held in all the counties, cities and towns of the Republic of Ireland in 1955 under the Local Government Act, 1955.

== Results ==
Party	Seats	±	First pref. votes	% FPV	±%
Fianna Fáil					
Fine Gael					
Clann na Talmhan					
Labour					
Clann na Poblachta					
Independent and others					
Total				100	—
