= Social credit =

Distributive economic theory

Social credit is a distributive philosophy of political economy developed in the 1920s and 1930s by the British engineer and economist C. H. Douglas. Douglas attributed economic downturns to discrepancies between the cost of goods and the compensation of the workers who made them. To combat what he saw as a chronic deficiency of purchasing power in the economy, Douglas prescribed government intervention in the form of the issuance of debt-free money directly to consumers or producers (if they sold their product below cost to consumers) in order to combat such discrepancy.

In defence of his ideas, Douglas wrote that "Systems were made for men, and not men for systems, and the interest of man which is self-development, is above all systems, whether theological, political or economic." Douglas said that Social Crediters want to build a new civilization based upon "absolute economic security" for the individual, where "they shall sit every man under his vine and under his fig tree; and none shall make them afraid." In his words, "what we really demand of existence is not that we shall be put into somebody else's Utopia, but we shall be put in a position to construct a Utopia of our own."

The idea of social credit attracted considerable interest in the interwar period, with the Alberta Social Credit Party briefly distributing "prosperity certificates" to the Albertan populace. However, Douglas opposed the distribution of prosperity certificates which were based upon the theories of Silvio Gesell.. John Maynard Keynes references Douglas's ideas in his book The General Theory of Employment, Interest and Money, as well as those of Gesell, however he rejected his theory.

== Economic theory ==
=== Factors of production and value ===
Douglas disagreed with classical economists who recognised only three factors of production: land, labour and capital. While Douglas did not deny the role of these factors in production, he considered the "cultural inheritance of society" as the primary factor. He defined cultural inheritance as the knowledge, techniques and processes that have accrued to us incrementally from the origins of civilization (i.e. progress). Consequently, mankind does not have to keep "reinventing the wheel". "We are merely the administrators of that cultural inheritance, and to that extent the cultural inheritance is the property of all of us, without exception." Adam Smith and David Ricardo claimed that labour creates all value, while Karl Marx highlighted labor and nature as the two sources of value. While Douglas did not deny that all costs ultimately relate to labour charges of some sort (past or present), he denied that the present labour of the world creates all wealth. Douglas carefully distinguished between value, costs and prices. He claimed that one of the factors resulting in a misdirection of thought in terms of the nature and function of money was economists' near-obsession about values and their relation to prices and incomes. While Douglas recognized "value in use" as a legitimate theory of values, he also considered values as subjective and not capable of being measured in an objective manner. Thus he rejected the idea of the role of money as a standard, or measure, of value. Douglas believed that money should act as a medium of communication by which consumers direct the distribution of production.

=== Economic sabotage ===
Closely associated with the concept of cultural inheritance as a factor of production is the social credit theory of economic sabotage. While Douglas believed the cultural heritage factor of production is primary in increasing wealth, he also believed that economic sabotage is the primary factor decreasing it. The word wealth derives from the Old English word wela, or "well-being", and Douglas believed that all production should increase personal well-being. Therefore, production that does not directly increase personal well-being is waste, or economic sabotage.

The economic effect of charging all the waste in industry to the consumer so curtails his purchasing power that an increasing percentage of the product of industry must be exported. The effect of this on the worker is that he has to do many times the amount of work which should be necessary to keep him in the highest standard of living, as a result of an artificial inducement to produce things he does not want, which he cannot buy, and which are of no use to the attainment of his internal standard of well-being.

By modern methods of accounting, the consumer is forced to pay for all the costs of production, including waste. The economic effect of charging the consumer with all waste in industry is that the consumer is forced to do much more work than is necessary. Douglas believed that wasted effort could be directly linked to confusion in regard to the purpose of the economic system, and the belief that the economic system exists to provide employment in order to distribute goods and services.

But it may be advisable to glance at some of the proximate causes operating to reduce the return for effort; and to realise the origin of most of the specific instances, it must be borne in mind that the existing economic system distributes goods and services through the same agency which induces goods and services, i.e., payment for work in progress. In other words, if production stops, distribution stops, and, as a consequence, a clear incentive exists to produce useless or superfluous articles in order that useful commodities already existing may be distributed. This perfectly simple reason is the explanation of the increasing necessity of what has come to be called economic sabotage; the colossal waste of effort which goes on in every walk of life quite unobserved by the majority of people because they are so familiar with it; a waste which yet so over-taxed the ingenuity of society to extend it that the climax of war only occurred in the moment when a culminating exhibition of organised sabotage was necessary to preserve the system from spontaneous combustion.

=== Purpose of an economy ===
Douglas claimed there were three possible policy alternatives with respect to the economic system:

1. The first of these is that it is a disguised Government, of which the primary, though admittedly not the only, object is to impose upon the world a system of thought and action.

2. The second alternative has a certain similarity to the first, but is simpler. It assumes that the primary objective of the industrial system is the provision of employment.

3. And the third, which is essentially simpler still, in fact, so simple that it appears entirely unintelligible to the majority, is that the object of the industrial system is merely to provide goods and services.

Douglas believed that it was the third policy alternative upon which an economic system should be based, but confusion of thought has allowed the industrial system to be governed by the first two objectives. If the purpose of our economic system is to deliver the maximum amount of goods and services with the least amount of effort, then the ability to deliver goods and services with the least amount of employment is actually desirable. Douglas proposed that unemployment is a logical consequence of machines replacing labour in the productive process, and any attempt to reverse this process through policies designed to attain full employment directly sabotages our cultural inheritance. Douglas also believed that the people displaced from the industrial system through the process of mechanization should still have the ability to consume the fruits of the system, because he suggested that we are all inheritors of the cultural inheritance, and his proposal for a national dividend is directly related to this belief.

=== The creditary nature of money ===
Douglas criticized classical economics because many of the theories are based upon a barter economy, whereas the modern economy is a monetary one. Initially, money originated from the productive system, when cattle owners punched leather discs which represented a head of cattle. These discs could then be exchanged for corn, and the corn producers could then exchange the disc for a head of cattle at a later date. The word "pecuniary" comes from the Latin pecunia, originally and literally meaning "cattle" (related to pecus, meaning "beast"). Today, the productive system and the monetary system are two separate entities. Douglas demonstrated that loans create deposits, and presented mathematical proof in his book Social Credit. Bank credit comprises the vast majority of money, and is created every time a bank makes a loan. Douglas was also one of the first to understand the creditary nature of money. The word credit derives from the Latin credere, meaning "to believe". "The essential quality of money, therefore, is that a man shall believe that he can get what he wants by the aid of it."

According to economists, money is a medium of exchange. Douglas argued that this may have once been the case when the majority of wealth was produced by individuals who subsequently exchanged it with each other. But in modern economies, division of labour splits production into multiple processes, and wealth is produced by people working in association with each other. For instance, an automobile worker does not produce any wealth (i.e., the automobile) by himself, but only in conjunction with other auto workers, the producers of roads, gasoline, insurance, etc.

In this opinion, wealth is a pool upon which people can draw, and money becomes a ticketing system. The efficiency gained by individuals cooperating in the productive process was named by Douglas as the "unearned increment of association" – historic accumulations of which constitute what Douglas called the cultural heritage. The means of drawing upon this pool is money distributed by the banking system.

Douglas believed that money should not be regarded as a commodity but rather as a ticket, a means of distribution of production. "There are two sides to this question of a ticket representing something that we can call, if we like, a value. There is the ticket itself – the money which forms the thing we call 'effective demand' – and there is something we call a price opposite to it." Money is effective demand, and the means of reclaiming that money are prices and taxes. As real capital replaces labour in the process of modernization, money should become increasingly an instrument of distribution. The idea that money is a medium of exchange is related to the belief that all wealth is created by the current labour of the world, and Douglas clearly rejected this belief, stating that the cultural inheritance of society is the primary factor in the creation of wealth, which makes money a distribution mechanism, not a medium of exchange.

Douglas also claimed the problem of production, or scarcity, had long been solved. The new problem was one of distribution. However, so long as orthodox economics makes scarcity a value, banks will continue to believe that they are creating value for the money they produce by making it scarce. Douglas criticized the banking system on two counts:

1. for being a form of government which has been centralizing its power for centuries, and
2. for claiming ownership of the money they create.

The former Douglas identified as being anti-social in policy. The latter he claimed was equivalent to claiming ownership of the nation. According to Douglas, money is merely an abstract representation of the real credit of the community, which is the ability of the community to deliver goods and services, when and where they are required.

== The A + B theorem ==
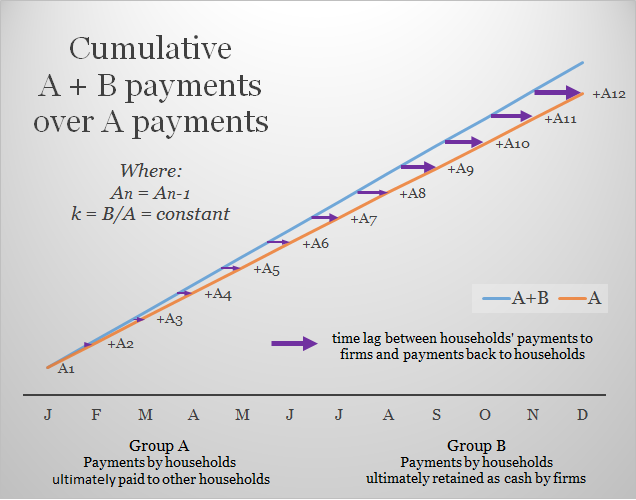
Cumulative payments A+B with steady payments of both A_{n} and B_{n}. In this case the time between present and the future time where the accumulated total of A can cover the current total of A+B grows ever larger, which results in the accumulation of loan credit or export credit.

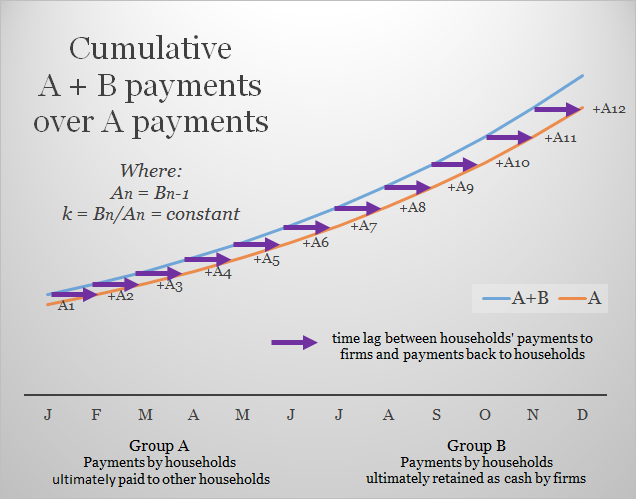
Cumulative payments A+B with a constant ratio of payments B_{n} over payments A_{n}. Payments A_{n} accumulated by next period are able to cover past payments B_{n-1}, however, this requires that payments A_{n} and B_{n} rise exponentially over time

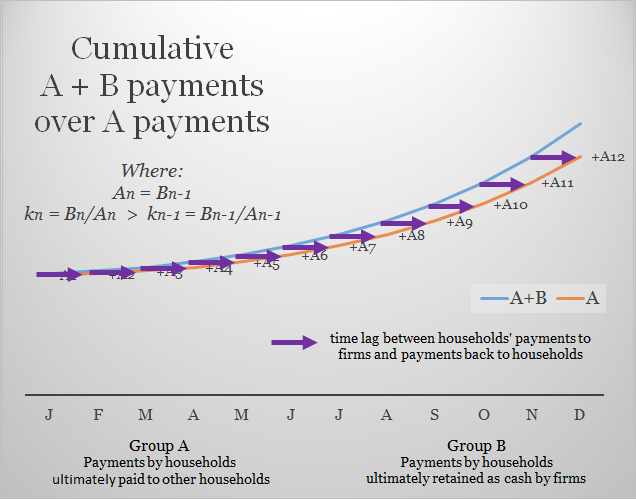
Cumulative A_{n}+B_{n} payments with an increasing ratio of payments B_{n} over payments A_{n}. Payments A_{n} accumulated by next period are able to cover past payments B_{n-1}, however, this requires that payments A_{n} and B_{n} rise exponentially over time.

In January 1919, "A Mechanical View of Economics" by C. H. Douglas was the first article to be published in the magazine New Age, edited by Alfred Richard Orage, critiquing the methods by which economic activity is typically measured:

It is not the purpose of this short article to depreciate the services of accountants; in fact, under the existing conditions probably no body of men has done more to crystallise the data on which we carry on the business of the world; but the utter confusion of thought which has undoubtedly arisen from the calm assumption of the book-keeper and the accountant that he and he alone was in a position to assign positive or negative values to the quantities represented by his figures is one of the outstanding curiosities of the industrial system; and the attempt to mould the activities of a great empire on such a basis is surely the final condemnation of an out-worn method.

In 1920, Douglas presented the A + B theorem in his book, Credit-Power and Democracy, in critique of accounting methodology pertinent to income and prices. In the fourth, Australian Edition of 1933, Douglas states:

A factory or other productive organization has, besides its economic function as a producer of goods, a financial aspect – it may be regarded on the one hand as a device for the distribution of purchasing-power to individuals through the media of wages, salaries, and dividends; and on the other hand as a manufactory of prices – financial values. From this standpoint, its payments may be divided into two groups:

Group A: All payments made to individuals (wages, salaries, and dividends).

Group B: All payments made to other organizations (raw materials, bank charges, and other external costs).

Now the rate of flow of purchasing-power to individuals is represented by A, but since all payments go into prices, the rate of flow of prices cannot be less than A+B. The product of any factory may be considered as something which the public ought to be able to buy, although in many cases it is an intermediate product of no use to individuals but only to a subsequent manufacture; but since A will not purchase A+B; a proportion of the product at least equivalent to B must be distributed by a form of purchasing-power which is not comprised in the description grouped under A. It will be necessary at a later stage to show that this additional purchasing power is provided by loan credit (bank overdrafts) or export credit.

Beyond empirical evidence, Douglas claims this deductive theorem demonstrates that total prices increase faster than total incomes when regarded as a flow.

In his pamphlet entitled "The New and the Old Economics", Douglas describes the cause of "B" payments:

I think that a little consideration will make it clear that in this sense an overhead charge is any charge in respect of which the actual distributed purchasing power does not still exist, and that practically this means any charge created at a further distance in the past than the period of cyclic rate of circulation of money. There is no fundamental difference between tools and intermediate products, and the latter may therefore be included.

In 1932, Douglas estimated the cyclic rate of circulation of money to be approximately three weeks. The cyclic rate of circulation of money measures the amount of time required for a loan to pass through the productive system and return to the bank. This can be calculated by determining the amount of clearings through the bank in a year divided by the average amount of deposits held at the banks (which varies very little). The result is the number of times money must turnover in order to produce these clearing house figures. In a testimony before the Alberta Agricultural Committee of the Alberta Legislature in 1934, Douglas said:

Now we know there are an increasing number of charges which originated from a period much anterior to three weeks, and included in those charges, as a matter of fact, are most of the charges made in, respect of purchases from one organization to another, but all such charges as capital charges (for instance, on a railway which was constructed a year, two years, three years, five or ten years ago, where charges are still extant), cannot be liquidated by a stream of purchasing power which does not increase in volume and which has a period of three weeks. The consequence is, you have a piling up of debt, you have in many cases a diminution of purchasing power being equivalent to the price of the goods for sale.

According to Douglas, the major consequence of the problem he identified in his A+B theorem is exponentially increasing debt. Further, he believed that society is forced to produce goods that consumers either do not want or cannot afford to purchase. The latter represents a favorable balance of trade, meaning a country exports more than it imports. But not every country can pursue this objective at the same time, as one country must import more than it exports when another country exports more than it imports. Douglas proposed that the long-term consequence of this policy is a trade war, typically resulting in real war – hence, the social credit admonition, "He who calls for Full-Employment calls for War!", expressed by the Social Credit Party of Great Britain and Northern Ireland, led by John Hargrave. The former represents excessive capital production and/or military build-up. Military buildup necessitates either the violent use of weapons or a superfluous accumulation of them. Douglas believed that excessive capital production is only a temporary correction, because the cost of the capital appears in the cost of consumer goods, or taxes, which will further exacerbate future gaps between income and prices.

In the first place, these capital goods have to be sold to someone. They form a reservoir of forced exports. They must, as intermediate products, enter somehow into the price of subsequent ultimate products and they produce a position of most unstable equilibrium, since the life of capital goods is in general longer than that of consumable goods, or ultimate products, and yet in order to meet the requirements for money to buy the consumable goods, the rate of production of capital goods must be continuously increased.

=== The A + B theorem and a cost accounting view of inflation ===
The replacement of labour by capital in the productive process implies that overhead charges (B) increase in relation to income (A), because "'B' is the financial representation of the lever of capital". As Douglas stated in his first article, "The Delusion of Superproduction":

The factory cost – not the selling price – of any article under our present industrial and financial system is made up of three main divisions-direct labor cost, material cost and overhead charges, the ratio of which varies widely, with the "modernity" of the method of production. For instance, a sculptor producing a work of art with the aid of simple tools and a block of marble has next to no overhead charges, but a very low rate of production, while a modern screw-making plant using automatic machines may have very high overhead charges and very low direct labour cost, or high rates of production.

Since increased industrial output per individual depends mainly on tools and method, it may almost be stated as a law that intensified production means a progressively higher ratio of overhead charges to direct labour cost, and, apart from artificial reasons, this is simply an indication of the extent to which machinery replaces manual labour, as it should.

If overhead charges are constantly increasing relative to income, any attempt to stabilize or increase income results in increasing prices. If income is constant or increasing, and overhead charges are continuously increasing due to technological advancement, then prices, which equal income plus overhead charges, must also increase. Further, any attempt to stabilize or decrease prices must be met by decreasing incomes according to this analysis. As the Phillips Curve demonstrates, inflation and unemployment are trade-offs, unless prices are reduced from monies derived from outside the productive system. According to Douglas's A+B theorem, the systemic problem of increasing prices, or inflation, is not "too much money chasing too few goods", but is the increasing rate of overhead charges in production due to the replacement of labour by capital in industry combined with a policy of full employment. Douglas did not suggest that inflation cannot be caused by too much money chasing too few consumer goods, but according to his analysis this is not the only cause of inflation, and inflation is systemic according to the rules of cost accountancy given overhead charges are constantly increasing relative to income. In other words, inflation can exist even if consumers have insufficient purchasing power to buy back all of production. Douglas claimed that there were two limits which governed prices, a lower limit governed by the cost of production, and an upper limit governed by what an article will fetch on the open market. Douglas suggested that this is the reason why deflation is regarded as a problem in orthodox economics because bankers and businessmen were very apt to forget the lower limit of prices.

=== Compensated price and national dividend ===
Douglas proposed to eliminate the gap between purchasing power and prices by increasing consumer purchasing power with credits which do not appear in prices in the form of a price rebate and a dividend. Formally called a "Compensated Price" and a "National (or Consumer) Dividend", a National Credit Office would be charged with the task of calculating the size of the rebate and dividend by determining a national balance sheet, and calculating aggregate production and consumption statistics.

The price rebate is based upon the observation that the real cost of production is the mean rate of consumption over the mean rate of production for an equivalent period of time.

$$\text{real cost (production)} = M \cdot \cfrac{\int_{T_1}^{T_2} \frac{dC}{dt} \, dt}{\int_{T_1}^{T_2} \frac{dP}{dt} \, dt}$$

where

- M = money distributed for a given programme of production,
- C = consumption,
- P = production.

The physical cost of producing something is the materials and capital that were consumed in its production, plus that amount of consumer goods labour consumed during its production. This total consumption represents the physical, or real, cost of production.

$$\text{true price } (\$) = \text{cost } (\$) \cdot \dfrac{\text{consumption } (\$) + \text{depreciation } (\$)}{\text{credit } (\$) + \text{production } (\$)}$$

where

- Consumption = cost of consumer goods,
- Depreciation = depreciation of real capital,
- Credit = Credit Created,
- Production = cost of total production

Since fewer inputs are consumed to produce a unit of output with every improvement in process, the real cost of production falls over time. As a result, prices should also decrease with the progression of time. "As society's capacity to deliver goods and services is increased by the use of plant and still more by scientific progress, and decreased by the production, maintenance, or depreciation of it, we can issue credit, in costs, at a greater rate than the rate at which we take it back through prices of ultimate products, if capacity to supply individuals exceeds desire."

Based on his conclusion that the real cost of production is less than the financial cost of production, the Douglas price rebate (Compensated Price) is determined by the ratio of consumption to production. Since consumption over a period of time is typically less than production over the same period of time in any industrial society, the real cost of goods should be less than the financial cost.

For example, if the money cost of a good is $100, and the ratio of consumption to production is 3/4, then the real cost of the good is $100(3/4) = $75. As a result, if a consumer spent $100 for a good, the National Credit Authority would rebate the consumer $25. The good costs the consumer $75, the retailer receives $100, and the consumer receives the difference of $25 via new credits created by the National Credit Authority.

The National Dividend is justified by the displacement of labour in the productive process due to technological increases in productivity. As human labour is increasingly replaced by machines in the productive process, Douglas believed people should be free to consume while enjoying increasing amounts of leisure, and that the Dividend would provide this freedom.

=== Critics of the A + B theorem and rebuttal ===
Critics of the theorem, such as J. M. Pullen, Hawtrey and J. M. Keynes argue there is no difference between A and B payments. Other critics, such as Gary North, argue that social credit policies are inflationary. "The A + B theorem has met with almost universal rejection from academic economists on the grounds that, although B payments may be made initially to "other organizations," they will not necessarily be lost to the flow of available purchasing power. A and B payments overlap through time. Even if the B payments are received and spent before the finished product is available for purchase, current purchasing power will be boosted by B payments received in the current production of goods that will be available for purchase in the future."

A. W. Joseph replied to this specific criticism in a paper given to the Birmingham Actuarial Society, "Banking and Industry":

Let A1+B1 be the costs in a period to time of articles produced by factories making consumable goods divided up into A1 costs which refer to money paid to individuals by means of salaries, wages, dividends, etc., and B1 costs which refer to money paid to other institutions. Let A2, B2 be the corresponding costs of factories producing capital equipment. The money distributed to individuals is A1+A2 and the cost of the final consumable goods is A1+B1. If money in the hands of the public is to be equal to the costs of consumable articles produced then A1+A2 = A1+B1 and therefore A2=B1. Now modern science has brought us to the stage where machines are more and more taking the place of human labour in producing goods, i.e. A1 is becoming less important relatively to B1 and A2 less important relatively to B2.

In symbols if B1/A1 = k1 and B2/A2 = k2 both k1 and k2 are increasing.

Since A2=B1 this means that (A2+B2)/(A1+B1)= (1+k2)*A2/(1+1/k1)*B1 = (1+k2)/(1+1/k1) which is increasing.

Thus in order that the economic system should keep working it is essential that capital goods should be produced in ever increasing quantity relatively to consumable goods. As soon as the ratio of capital goods to consumable goods slackens, costs exceed money distributed, i.e. the consumer is unable to purchase the consumable goods coming on the market."

And in a reply to Dr. Hobson, Douglas restated his central thesis: "To reiterate categorically, the theorem criticised by Mr. Hobson: the wages, salaries and dividends distributed during a given period do not, and cannot, buy the production of that period; that production can only be bought, i.e., distributed, under present conditions by a draft, and an increasing draft, on the purchasing power distributed in respect of future production, and this latter is mainly and increasingly derived from financial credit created by the banks."

Incomes are paid to workers during a multi-stage program of production. According to the convention of accepted orthodox rules of accountancy, those incomes are part of the financial cost and price of the final product. For the product to be purchased with incomes earned in respect of its manufacture, all of these incomes would have to be saved until the product's completion. Douglas argued that incomes are typically spent on past production to meet the present needs of living, and will not be available to purchase goods completed in the future – goods which must include the sum of incomes paid out during their period of manufacture in their price. Consequently, this does not liquidate the financial cost of production inasmuch as it merely passes charges of one accountancy period on as mounting charges against future periods. In other words, according to Douglas, supply does not create enough demand to liquidate all the costs of production. Douglas denied the validity of Say's law in economics.

While John Maynard Keynes referred to Douglas as a "private, perhaps, but not a major in the brave army of heretics", he did state that Douglas "is entitled to claim, as against some of his orthodox adversaries, that he at least has not been wholly oblivious of the outstanding problem of our economic system". While Keynes said that Douglas's A+B theorem "includes much mere mystification", he reaches a similar conclusion to Douglas when he states:

Thus the problem of providing that new capital-investment shall always outrun capital-disinvestment sufficiently to fill the gap between net income and consumption, presents a problem which is increasingly difficult as capital increases. New capital-investment can only take place in excess of current capital-disinvestment if future expenditure on consumption is expected to increase. Each time we secure to-day's equilibrium by increased investment we are aggravating the difficulty of securing equilibrium to-morrow.

The criticism that social credit policies are inflationary is based upon what economists call the quantity theory of money, which states that the quantity of money multiplied by its velocity of circulation equals total purchasing power. Douglas was quite critical of this theory stating, "The velocity of the circulation of money in the ordinary sense of the phrase, is – if I may put it that way – a complete myth. No additional purchasing power at all is created by the velocity of the circulation of money. The rate of transfer from hand-to-hand, as you might say, of goods is increased, of course, by the rate of spending, but no more costs can be canceled by one unit of purchasing power than one unit of cost. Every time a unit of purchasing power passes through the costing system it creates a cost, and when it comes back again to the same costing system by the buying and transfer of the unit of production to the consuming system it may be cancelled, but that process is quite irrespective of what is called the velocity of money, so the categorical answer is that I do not take any account of the velocity of money in that sense." The Alberta Social Credit government published in a committee report what was perceived as an error in regards to this theory: "The fallacy in the theory lies in the incorrect assumption that money 'circulates', whereas it is issued against production, and withdrawn as purchasing power as the goods are bought for consumption."

Other critics argue that if the gap between income and prices exists as Douglas claimed, the economy would have collapsed in short order. They also argue that there are periods of time in which purchasing power is in excess of the price of consumer goods for sale.

Douglas replied to these criticisms in his testimony before the Alberta Agricultural Committee:

What people who say that forget is that we were piling up debt at that time at the rate of ten millions sterling a day and if it can be shown, and it can be shown, that we are increasing debt continuously by normal operation of the banking system and the financial system at the present time, then that is proof that we are not distributing purchasing power sufficient to buy the goods for sale at that time; otherwise we should not be increasing debt, and that is the situation.

== Political theory ==
C.H. Douglas defined democracy as the "will of the people", not rule by the majority, suggesting that social credit could be implemented by any political party supported by effective public demand. Once implemented to achieve a realistic integration of means and ends, party politics would cease to exist. Traditional ballot box democracy is incompatible with Social Credit, which assumes the right of individuals to choose freely one choice at a time, and to contract out of unsatisfactory associations. Douglas advocated what he called the "responsible vote", where anonymity in the voting process would no longer exist. "The individual voter must be made individually responsible, not collectively taxable, for his vote." Douglas believed that party politics should be replaced by a "union of electors" in which the only role of an elected official would be to implement the popular will. Douglas believed that the implementation of such a system was necessary as otherwise the government would be controlled by international financiers. Douglas also opposed the secret ballot arguing that it resulted in electoral irresponsibility, calling it a "Jewish" technique used to ensure Barabbas was freed leaving Christ to be crucified.

Douglas considered the constitution an organism, not an organization. In this view, establishing the supremacy of common law is essential to ensure protection of individual rights from an all-powerful parliament. Douglas also believed the effectiveness of British government is determined structurally by application of a Christian concept known as Trinitarianism: "In some form or other, sovereignty in the British Isles for the last two thousand years has been Trinitarian. Whether we look on this Trinitarianism under the names of King, Lords and Commons or as Policy, Sanctions and Administration, the Trinity-in-Unity has existed, and our national success has been greatest when the balance (never perfect) has been approached."

Opposing the formation of Social Credit parties, C.H. Douglas believed a group of elected amateurs should never direct a group of competent experts in technical matters. While experts are ultimately responsible for achieving results, the goal of politicians should be to pressure those experts to deliver policy results desired by the populace. According to Douglas, "the proper function of Parliament is to force all activities of a public nature to be carried on so that the individuals who comprise the public may derive the maximum benefit from them. Once the idea is grasped, the criminal absurdity of the party system becomes evident."

== History ==
=== The writings of C. H. Douglas ===
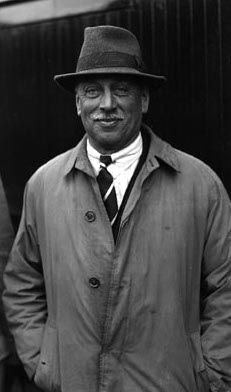
C. H. Douglas, founder of the "social credit" economic theory, in Edmonton, Alberta, Canada.

C. H. Douglas was a civil engineer who pursued his higher education at Cambridge University. His early writings appeared most notably in the British intellectual journal The New Age. The editor of that publication, Alfred Orage, devoted the magazines The New Age and later The New English Weekly to the promulgation of Douglas's ideas until his death on the eve of his BBC speech on social credit, 5 November 1934, in the Poverty in Plenty Series.

Douglas's first book, Economic Democracy, was published in 1920, soon after his article The Delusion of Super-Production appeared in 1918 in the English Review. Among Douglas's other early works were The Control and Distribution of Production, Credit-Power and Democracy, Warning Democracy and The Monopoly of Credit. Of considerable interest is the evidence he presented to the Canadian House of Commons Select Committee on Banking and Commerce in 1923, to the British parliamentary Macmillan Committee on Finance and Industry in 1930, which included exchanges with economist John Maynard Keynes, and to the Agricultural Committee of the Alberta Legislature in 1934 during the term of the United Farmers of Alberta Government in that Canadian province.

The writings of C. H. Douglas spawned a worldwide movement, most prominently in the British Commonwealth, with a presence in Europe. In the United States Orage, during his sojourn there, promoted Douglas's ideas. In the United States, the New Democracy group was directed by the American author Gorham Munson who contributed a major book on social credit titled Aladdin’s Lamp: The Wealth of the American People. While Canada and New Zealand had electoral successes with "social credit" political parties, the efforts in England and Australia were devoted primarily to pressuring existing parties to implement social credit. This function was performed especially by Douglas's social credit secretariat in England and the Commonwealth Leagues of Rights in Australia. Douglas continued writing and contributing to the secretariat's journals, initially Social Credit and soon thereafter The Social Crediter (which continues to be published by the Secretariat) for the remainder of his lifetime, concentrating more on political and philosophical issues during his later years.

=== The theories of C. H. Douglas ===
It was while he was reorganising the work at Farnborough, during World War I, that Douglas noticed that the weekly total costs of goods produced was greater than the sums paid to individuals for wages, salaries and dividends. This seemed to contradict the theory of classic Ricardian economics, that all costs are distributed simultaneously as purchasing power. Troubled by the seeming difference between the way money flowed and the objectives of industry ("delivery of goods and services", in his opinion), Douglas decided to apply engineering methods to the economic system.

Douglas collected data from more than a hundred large British businesses and found that in nearly every case, except that of companies becoming bankrupt, the sums paid out in salaries, wages and dividends were always less than the total costs of goods and services produced each week: consumers did not have enough income to buy back what they had made. He published his observations and conclusions in an article in the magazine The English Review, where he suggested: "That we are living under a system of accountancy which renders the delivery of the nation's goods and services to itself a technical impossibility." He later formalized this observation in his A+B theorem. Douglas proposed to eliminate this difference between total prices and total incomes by augmenting consumers' purchasing power through a National Dividend and a Compensated Price Mechanism.

According to Douglas, the true purpose of production is consumption, and production must serve the genuine, freely expressed interests of consumers. In order to accomplish this objective, he believed that each citizen should have a beneficial, not direct, inheritance in the communal capital conferred by complete access to consumer goods assured by the National Dividend and Compensated Price. Douglas thought that consumers, fully provided with adequate purchasing power, will establish the policy of production through exercise of their monetary vote. In this view, the term economic democracy does not mean worker control of industry, but democratic control of credit. Removing the policy of production from banking institutions, government, and industry, social credit envisages an "aristocracy of producers, serving and accredited by a democracy of consumers".

=== Political history ===
During early years of the philosophy, the British Labour Party and trade unions dismissed social credit, as hierarchical views of Fabian socialism, economic growth and full employment, were incompatible with the National Dividend and abolition of wage slavery suggested by Douglas. In an effort to discredit the social credit movement, one leading Fabian, Sidney Webb, is said to have declared that he did not care whether Douglas was technically correct or not – he simply did not like his policy. In the Irish Free State promoted by Maud Gonne, and subsequently by Denis Ireland, Douglas's ideas briefly spawned the Irish Social Credit Party. Confused in the public mind with the Communist Party of Ireland, its meetings were attacked.

==== Aberhart administration ====
In 1935, the world's first Social Credit government was elected in Alberta, Canada. It was led by Calgary school principal William Aberhart. Discussion of social credit in the early 1920s by Alberta MP William Irvine and others, and a federal Royal Commission into bank reform in the 1920s after the collapse of the Home Bank of Canada helped incite discussion on the topic. A 1928 book by Maurice Colbourne, entitled Unemployment or war, helped convince Aberhart that Social Credit was the solution to unemployment. Aberhart added a heavy dose of fundamentalist Christianity to Douglas' theories. Thus the Canadian social credit movement, which was largely nurtured in Alberta, acquired a strong aspect of social conservative thought. Some historians state that neither Aberhart nor his supporters understood the works of Douglas, and that his followers simply rallied around Aberhart's charisma.

Douglas was consulted by the United Farmers of Alberta Alberta provincial government, (a populist farmers movement), but the UFA was unwilling to adopt Social Credit. Douglas was consulted as an advisor to Aberhart, but he had differences with Aberhart's policies and resigned the following year. Douglas abhorred that Aberhart sought orthodox financial counsel with respect to Alberta's finances. Douglas criticized Aberhart's policies and that criticism was made public when Douglas published correspondence between them in his book, The Alberta Experiment.

While Premier Aberhart tried to balance the provincial budget, Douglas argued the concept of a "balanced budget" was inconsistent with Social Credit principles. Douglas stated that, under existing rules of financial cost accountancy, balancing all budgets within an economy simultaneously is an arithmetic impossibility. In a letter to Aberhart, Douglas stated:

This seems to be a suitable occasion on which to emphasise the proposition that a Balanced Budget is quite inconsistent with the use of Social Credit (i.e., Real Credit – the ability to deliver goods and services 'as, when and where required') in the modern world, and is simply a statement in accounting figures that the progress of the country is stationary, i.e., that it consumes exactly what it produces, including capital assets. The result of the acceptance of this proposition is that all capital appreciation becomes quite automatically the property of those who create and issue of money [i.e., the banking system] and the necessary unbalancing of the Budget is covered by Debts.

Douglas sent two social credit technical advisors to Alberta from the United Kingdom, L. Denis Byrne and George F. Powell, to Alberta. But early attempts to put social credit legislation into law were baffled when they were ruled ultra vires by the Privy Council in London and the Supreme Court. Drawing on the monetary theories of Silvio Gesell, William Aberhart issued a currency substitute known as prosperity certificates. This stamped scrip intentionally depreciated in value the longer they were held, and Douglas openly criticized the idea:

Gesell's theory was that the trouble with the world was that people saved money so that what you had to do was to make them spend it faster. Disappearing money is the heaviest form of continuous taxation ever devised. The theory behind this idea of Gesell's was that what is required is to stimulate trade – that you have to get people frantically buying goods – a perfectly sound idea so long as the objective of life is merely trading.

The government and most retail stores did not accept the scrip in payment.

As well as issuing its own money (the scrip), the Alberta government under Aberhart brought in a measure of social credit, with the establishment of a government-owned banking system, the Alberta Treasury Branches, still in operation today and now among the very few government-owned banks in North America that serve the public. (See for comparison the Bank of North Dakota.) As well during Aberhart's time as premier, Alberta became the first and only Canadian province to default on its bond payments. The province failed to redeem two bond issues totaling $3,200,000. (The bonds were eventually honored once the province's economy improved in the 1940s.)

In 1938, Aberhart's Alberta Social Credit Party had 41,000 paid members. They composed a broad coalition that included those who believed in Douglas' monetary policies, moderate socialists and down-and-outs who wanted a strong man in control. Socialists helped influence the party to form alliances with the Co-operative Commonwealth Federation and the Communist Party of Canada in various local and provincial elections. However, when Albertans saw the government fail to deliver on its promises to control prices and especially to distribute the promised social dividends, the party's membership fell, and was just 3,500 by 1942. Aberhart died in 1943 but had stated his intention was to resume Social Credit reforms at the war's end.

==== Later activities ====
Under Ernest Manning, who succeeded Aberhart as party leader, the Alberta Social Credit Party maintained its popularity. It benefitted from a post-war economic boom and large oil revenues helping the party retain power for a quarter of a century. Under Manning, the party departed from its origins and became popularly identified as a right wing Christian populist party, focusing much of its efforts on combatting Alberta's unions, and implementing a red scare.

C.H. Douglas maintained his criticism of Alberta government policies. In the Secretariat's journal, An Act for the Better Management of the Credit of Alberta, Douglas presented a critical analysis of the Social Credit movement in Alberta, in which he said, "The Manning administration is no more a Social Credit administration than the British government is Labour". Manning accused Douglas and his followers of anti-Semitism, and purged "Douglasites" from the Alberta government. Alberta's Social Credit provincial government finally fell in 1971.

The British Columbia Social Credit Party won power in 1952 in the province to Alberta's west, but had little in common with Social Credit bank reform, Major Douglas or his theories.

Social credit parties also enjoyed some electoral success at the federal level in Canada. Many Alberta MPs from 1935 to 1971 were Social Credit, including Norman Jaques, Ambrose Holowach and Ernest George Hansell. Albertans initiated the Social Credit Party of Canada, and it created another base of support in Quebec.

Social Credit also did well nationally in New Zealand, where it was the country's third party for almost 30 years.

== Philosophy ==
Douglas described Social Credit as "the policy of a philosophy", and warned against considering it solely as a scheme for monetary reform. He called this philosophy "practical Christianity" and stated that its central issue is the Incarnation. Douglas believed that there was a Canon which permeated the universe, and Jesus Christ was the Incarnation of this Canon. However, he also believed that Christianity remained ineffective so long as it remained transcendental. Religion, which derives from the Latin word religare (to "bind back"), was intended to be a binding back to reality. Social Credit is concerned with the incarnation of Christian principles in our organic affairs. Specifically, it is concerned with the principles of association and how to maximize the increments of association which redound to satisfaction of the individual in society – while minimizing any decrements of association.

The goal of Social Credit is to maximize immanent sovereignty. Social credit is consonant with the Christian doctrine of salvation through unearned grace, and is therefore incompatible with any variant of the doctrine of salvation through works. Works need not be of Purity in intent or of desirable consequence and in themselves alone are as "filthy rags". For instance, the present system makes destructive, obscenely wasteful wars a virtual certainty – which provides much "work" for everyone. Social credit has been called the Third Alternative to the futile Left-Right Duality.

Although Douglas defined social credit as a philosophy with Christian origins, he did not envision a Christian theocracy. Douglas did not believe that religion should be mandated by law or external compulsion. Practical Christian society is Trinitarian in structure, based upon a constitution where the constitution is an organism changing in relation to our knowledge of the nature of the universe. "The progress of human society is best measured by the extent of its creative ability. Imbued with a number of natural gifts, notably reason, memory, understanding and free will, man has learned gradually to master the secrets of nature, and to build for himself a world wherein lie the potentialities of peace, security, liberty and abundance." Douglas said that social crediters want to build a new civilization based upon absolute economic security for the individual – where "they shall sit every man under his vine and under his fig tree; and none shall make them afraid." In keeping with this goal, Douglas was opposed to all forms of taxation on real property. This set social credit at variance from the land-taxing recommendations of Henry George.

Social credit society recognizes the fact that the relationship between man and God is unique. In this view, it is essential to allow man the greatest possible freedom in order to pursue this relationship. Douglas defined freedom as the ability to choose and refuse one choice at a time, and to contract out of unsatisfactory associations. Douglas believed that if people were given the economic security and leisure achievable in the context of a social credit dispensation, most would end their service to Mammon and use their free time to pursue spiritual, intellectual or cultural goals resulting in self-development. Douglas opposed what he termed "the pyramid of power". Totalitarianism represents this pyramid and is the antithesis of social credit. It turns the government into an end instead of a means, and the individual into a means instead of an end – Demon est deus inversus – "the Devil is God upside down." Social credit is designed to give the individual the maximum freedom allowable given the need for association in economic, political and social matters. Social Credit elevates the importance of the individual and holds that all institutions exist to serve the individual – that the State exists to serve its citizens, not that individuals exist to serve the State.

Douglas emphasized that all policy derives from its respective philosophy and that "Society is primarily metaphysical, and must have regard to the organic relationships of its prototype." Social credit rejects dialectical materialistic philosophy. "The tendency to argue from the particular to the general is a special case of the sequence from materialism to collectivism. If the universe is reduced to molecules, ultimately we can dispense with a catalogue and a dictionary; all things are the same thing, and all words are just sounds – molecules in motion."

Douglas divided philosophy into two schools of thought that he termed the "classical school" and the "modern school", which are broadly represented by philosophies of Aristotle and Francis Bacon respectively. Douglas was critical of both schools of thought, but believed that "the truth lies in appreciation of the fact that neither conception is useful without the other".

=== Criticism for antisemitism ===
Social crediters and Douglas have been criticized for spreading antisemitism. Douglas was critical of "international Jewry", especially in his later writings. He asserted that such Jews controlled many of the major banks and were involved in an international conspiracy to centralize the power of finance. Some people have claimed that Douglas was antisemitic because he was quite critical of pre-Christian philosophy. In his book Social Credit, he wrote that, "It is not too much to say that one of the root ideas through which Christianity comes into conflict with the conceptions of the Old Testament and the ideals of the pre-Christians' era is in respect of this dethronement of abstractionism."

Douglas was opposed to abstractionist philosophies because he believed that these philosophies inevitably resulted in the elevation of abstractions, such as the state, and legal fictions, such as corporate personhood, over the individual. He also believed that what Jews considered as abstractionist thought tended to encourage them to endorse communist ideals and an emphasis on collectives over individuals. Historian John L. Finlay, in his book Social Credit: The English Origins, wrote, "Anti-Semitism of the Douglas kind, if it can be called anti-Semitism at all, may be fantastic, may be dangerous even, in that it may be twisted into a dreadful form, but it is not itself vicious nor evil." Adding that "while Douglas was critical of some aspects of Jewish thought, Douglas did not seek to discriminate against Jews as a people or race. It was never suggested that the National Dividend be withheld from them."

== Groups influenced by social credit ==
=== Australia ===
- Australian League of Rights
- Douglas Credit Party

=== Canada ===
Federal political parties

- Social Credit Party of Canada
- Ralliement créditiste
- Abolitionist Party of Canada/Christian Credit Party
- Canadian Action Party
- Global Party of Canada
- Canada Party
- New Democracy

Provincial political parties

- Alberta Social Credit Party
- Pro-Life Alberta Political Association (active)
- British Columbia Social Credit Party
- Manitoba Social Credit Party
- Social Credit Party of New Brunswick
- Social Credit Party of Ontario
- Pauper Party of Ontario (active)
- Ralliement créditiste du Québec
- Les Démocrates
- Parti crédit social uni
- Social Credit Party of Saskatchewan

Organizations/Movements

- Pilgrims of Saint Michael
- Committee on Monetary and Economic Reform
- Canadian social credit movement
- See also: Prosperity Certificate

=== Ireland ===
- Irish Monetary Reform Association
- Social Credit Party (Ireland)

=== New Zealand ===
- Country Party
- Democratic Labour Party
- New Democratic Party (New Zealand)
- Real Democracy Movement
- Social Credit Party (New Zealand)
- New Zealand Social Credit Association (Inc)

=== Solomon Islands ===
- Solomon Islands Social Credit Party

=== United Kingdom ===
- Douglas Social Credit Secretariat
- Social Credit Party of Great Britain and Northern Ireland
- British People's Party
- Populist Alliance (active)

== Literary figures ==
As lack of finance has been a constant impediment to the development of the arts and literature, the concept of economic democracy through social credit had immediate appeal in literary circles. Names associated with social credit include C. M. Grieve, Charlie Chaplin, William Carlos Williams, Ezra Pound, J. R. R. Tolkien, C. S. Lewis, T. S. Eliot, Flannery O'Connor, Dorothy Day, Thomas Merton, Herbert Read, George Orwell, Aldous Huxley, Ray Bradbury, Denis Ireland, Storm Jameson, Eimar O'Duffy, Sybil Thorndike, Bonamy Dobrée, Eric de Maré and the American publisher James Laughlin. Hilaire Belloc and G. K. Chesterton espoused similar ideas. In 1933 Eimar O'Duffy published Asses in Clover, a science fiction fantasy exploration of social credit themes. His social credit economics book Life and Money: Being a Critical Examination of the Principles and Practice of Orthodox Economics with A Practical Scheme to End the Muddle it has made of our Civilisation, was endorsed by Douglas.

Robert A. Heinlein described a social credit economy in his 2003 posthumously published first novel written in 1938, For Us, The Living: A Comedy of Customs, and his 1942 novel Beyond This Horizon describes a similar system in less detail. In Heinlein's future society, government is not funded by taxation. Instead, government controls the currency and prevents inflation by providing a price rebate to participating business and a guaranteed income to every citizen.

In his novel The Trick Top Hat, part of his 1979 Schrödinger's Cat Trilogy, Robert Anton Wilson described the implementation by the president of an alternate future United States of an altered form of social credit, in which the government issues a National Dividend to all citizens in the form of "trade aids", which can be spent like money but which cannot be lent at interest (in order to mollify the banking industry) and which eventually expire (to prevent inflation and hoarding).

Frances Hutchinson, Chairperson of the Social Credit Secretariat, has co-authored, with Brian Burkitt, a book entitled The Political Economy of Social Credit and Guild Socialism.

== See also ==
- Basic income
- Citizen's dividend
- Distributism
- Monetary reform
- Social democracy
- Social dividend
- Stock and flow
- Surplus value
- Welfare state
