= Córas na Poblachta =

Irish republican political party in the 1940s

- President: Simon Donnelly
- Youth-wing Leader: Gearóid Ó Cuinneagáin
- Founded: 21 February 1940
- Dissolved: c. 1944
- Newspaper: Aiséirí
- Youth wing: Aicéin
- Ideology: Anti-capitalism; Corporatism; Fascism; Irish republicanism; Irish nationalism
- Political position: Far-right

Córas na Poblachta (Irish: [ˈkoːɾˠəsˠ n̪ˠə ˈpˠɔbˠlˠəxt̪ˠə]; English: Republican System) was a minor Irish republican political party founded in 1940.

== Origins ==
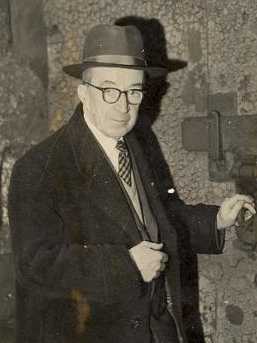
IRA Veteran Simon Donnelly served as President of the party

The idea for a new party was discussed at a meeting in Dublin on 21 February 1940 attended by 104 former officers of the pro- and anti-Treaty wings of the Irish Republican Army. The inaugural meeting of the new party took place on 2 March 1940.

Simon Donnelly, who had fought in Boland's Mill under Éamon de Valera in 1916, the former leader of the Dublin section of the IRA, and former chief of the Irish Republican Police, was elected as president of a central committee of fifteen members. Other leaders were Seán Fitzpatrick, another Irish War of Independence veteran; Con Lehane, who had lately left the IRA; Séamus Gibbons; Tom O'Rourke; Seán Dowling, one of Rory O'Connor's principal lieutenants in the Irish Civil War; Colonel Roger McCorley, one of the principal IRA leaders in Belfast during the War of Independence who had taken the Irish Free State side in the Civil War; Frank Thornton, one of Michael Collins' top intelligence officers; Roger McHugh, a lecturer in English at University College Dublin and later professor; Captain Martin Bell and Peter O'Connor.

Also in attendance at the first meeting was Seamus O'Donovan, Director of Chemicals on IRA Headquarters Staff in 1921 and architect of the IRA Sabotage Campaign in England by the IRA in 1939–40. Indeed, O'Donovan proposed several of the basic resolutions. Additionally the meeting was attended by Eoin O'Duffy and several former leaders of the Irish Christian Front.

Many members of the Irish far-right joined Córas na Poblachta including Gearóid Ó Cuinneagáin, who became the leader of the party's youth wing Aicéin and would go on to found Ailtirí na hAiséirghe, Alexander McCabe, Maurice O'Connor and Reginald Eager from the Irish Friends of Germany, George Griffin, Patrick Moylett, his brother John and Joseph Andrews of the People's National Party, Dermot Brennan of Saoirse Gaedheal, and Hugh O'Neill and Alexander Carey of Córas Gaedhealach. As a result, the party assumed a pro-German and antisemitic attitude which was frequently expressed in party functions, and Gardaí suspected Córas members of daubing the walls of Trinity College in antisemitic slogans following the visit of British politician Leslie Hore-Belisha to Ireland in 1941.

Socialist republicans Nora Connolly O'Brien and Helena Molony took an interest in the group. Reflecting divisions within the IRA, a minority of the party's leaders sympathised with communism rather than fascism.

== Aims ==
The main aim of Córas na Poblachta was the formal declaration of a Republic. It also demanded that the Irish language be given greater prominence in street names, shop signs, and government documents and bank notes. It proposed to introduce national service in order that (male) citizens understood their responsibilities. The party's economic policy was the statutory right to employment and a living wage. It proposed breaking the link with the British pound, the nationalisation of banks and the making of bank officials into civil servants. In the area of education, the party espoused free education for all children over primary age as a right, and university education when feasible. It also called for the introduction of children's allowances. In addition Córas na Poblachta advocated for "the destruction of the Masonic Order in Ireland" and during its founding meeting reporters were told that the party would be ready to take over the government of Ireland "on either a corporate or fascist basis".

== Ailtirí na hAiséirghe ==
The party had close ties with the Irish nationalist and pro-fascist party Ailtirí na hAiséirghe, whose leader, Gearóid Ó Cuinneagáin, had led Córas na Poblachta's youth wing Aicéin until its independence was terminated in 1942. There was talk of a merger however while the majority of the party's executive committee, noted by G2 to be made up of "four ex-Army men, old I.R.A., ex-Blue Shirts and a number of I.R.A. who had been active up until comparatively recently", desired a combination of Ireland's extreme nationalist movements, the three most prominent leaders Simon Donnelly, Sean Dowling and Roger McCorley opposed one due to the fear that the party would be submerged in a joint organisation. Ó Cuinneagáin was dismissive of Córas na Poblachta's prospects and discussions between him and the party's leaders reinforced their fears that Ó Cuinneagáin sought an outright takeover by Aiséirghe. Proposals for a merging of the two parties were dropped though they continued to maintain cordial relations and co-operated in the 1943 Irish general election.

== Support ==
The party was not successful and failed to take a seat in a by-election held shortly after the party's foundation. The party slowly fell apart, and Tim Pat Coogan notes that: “Dissolution occurred because people tended to discuss the party rather than join it.” Importantly, the party was not supported by the hardcore of republican legitimatists, such as Brian O'Higgins, who viewed the IRA Army Council as the legitimate government of an existing Irish Republic. Indeed, in March 1940, O'Higgins published a pamphlet entitled Declare the Republic lambasting the new party as making what he regarded as false promises that would be compromised on following the party's election to the Oireachtas.

=== 1943 General Election ===
Córas fielded candidates in the 1943 General Election, none getting elected and receiving a total of 3,892 votes between them.

Candidate	Constituency
Denis J. O'Driscoll	Tipperary
Simon Donnelly	Dublin South
Sean Dowling	Dublin South
Martin Bell	Dublin North-East

== Legacy ==
Although a failure, Tim Pat Coogan argues Córas was the “nucleus” of the Clann na Poblachta party which emerged to help take power from Fianna Fáil in 1948.

== Party publications ==
- Summary of policy, Dublin: Córas na Poblachta Central Committee, 1940.
- The republican plan for the new Ireland, Dublin: Córas na Poblachta Central Committee, 1942.
- Aicein: voice of the Irish Youth Movement, Córas na Poblachta, ca. 1941.
