= Ailtirí na hAiséirghe =

Defunct Irish political party

Architects of the Resurrection Ailtirí na hAiséirghe
- Founder: Gearóid Ó Cuinneagáin
- Founded: March 1942; 84 years ago
- Dissolved: 1958; 68 years ago
- Split from: Conradh na Gaeilge
- Newspaper: Aiséirí
- Youth wing: Craobh na hAiséirghe
- Membership: 2,000 (mid 1945 est.)
- Ideology: Fascism; Antisemitism; Irish nationalism; Catholic social teaching; Pan-Celticism; Corporate statism
- Political position: Far-right
- Religion: Christianity
- Colours: Green

Ailtirí na hAiséirghe (Irish pronunciation: [ˈal̠ʲtʲəɾʲiː n̪ˠə ˈhaʃeːɾʲiː], meaning "Architects of the Resurrection") was a fascist political party in Ireland, founded by Gearóid Ó Cuinneagáin in March 1942. The party sought to form a totalitarian Irish Christian corporatist state and its sympathies were with the Axis powers in World War II. It was one of a wave of far-right parties in 1940s Ireland, like the Irish Monetary Reform Association, that failed to achieve mainstream success.

== History ==
=== Background ===
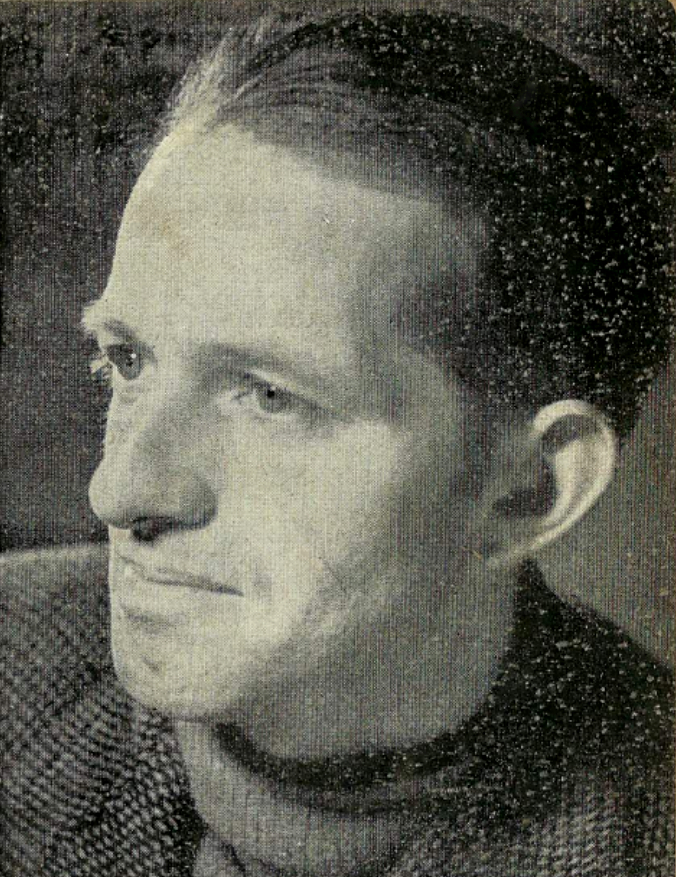
Ailtirí na hAiséirghe founder Gearóid Ó Cuinneagáin, circa 1942

The group was founded out of a branch of Conradh na Gaeilge established by Ó Cuinneagáin in 1940. He had left a job in the civil service, and moved to County Donegal in order to become fluent in Irish. Having been a member of several underground pro-Axis organisations but become disillusioned with their limited vision of seeing a German victory as an end in itself rather than an opportunity to transform Irish society, he established Craobh na hAiséirghe (Branch of the Resurrection) as a militant and active wing of Conradh to form "a Hitler Youth Movement under the guise of an Irish class." The branch grew rapidly, holding public events as well as organising Irish language classes, and Ó Cuinneagáin was elected to Conradh na Gaelige's executive. At the time, many ideas of the far right, especially corporatism, were fashionable in Ireland, even with ministers of the democratically elected Irish government, and seemed to chime well with Catholic social teaching. These ideas were mixed with more traditional Irish nationalism and especially a hostility to the partition of Ireland.

By March 1942, though, Ó Cuinneagáin wished for a wider and more explicitly political organisation, motivated by his failure to be elected president of Conradh na Gaelige and conflicts with other members of its executive. A two-hour speech made by Ó Cuinneagáin on Whit weekend announcing the establishment of Ailtirí na hAiséirghe as an openly fascist movement with the aim of establishing a totalitarian government in Ireland and the publication of Aiséirghe 1942, devoted purely to Ó Cuinneagáin's political views, alienated many of their members. A split developed which was resolved amicably between Ó Cuinneagáin and the culturalist Proinsias Mac an Bheatha, who agreed to assume Craobh na hAiséirghe's debts and changed the branch's name to Glún na Buaidhe (Generation of Victory).

=== Members and activities ===
The Department of Justice estimated the party's Dublin city membership after six months in existence to be about 30 or 40, with very few supporters outside Dublin. Due to the Dublin organisation squeezing local branches by taking a large amount of the profit from membership fees, propaganda and donations, along with fears of internment for membership of the party there existed a widespread culture among local organisations of maintaining a separate set of local membership records rather than forwarding completed application forms to Dublin, allowing the branches to retain the whole of their members' affiliation fees and count on a reliable flow of income from weekly in-house collections, and selling Aiséirghe badges as a token of de facto membership, allowing wearers to take part in activities on the same basis as those properly enrolled.

R.M. Douglas estimates that the party had around 2,000 self-identified members in the summer of 1945, with the highest concentration of branches and active members being found in counties Cork, Tipperary and Wexford. Despite the party's focus on the Irish language they gained few supporters in the Gaeltacht, while Aiséirghe's support in Northern Ireland was decimated after a crackdown by the Royal Ulster Constabulary following a failed publicity stunt by Ó Cuinneagáin in 1943. A significant number of Aiséirghe members were women compared to other Irish political parties or European fascist parties, primarily motivated by concern over foreign cultural influence in Ireland and fear of being forced to emigrate, as Ireland had an unusually high rate of female emigration compared to most of Europe.

Aiséirghe began to arrange speeches where crowds of people might be found, such as pubs, cinemas, sporting events and churches, as well as to organise parades and Irish dancing. Aiséirghe speakers would deliver a speech in Irish before switching to English, something which, according to Aindrias Ó Scolaidhe aroused the curiosity of crowds. The party's members also engaged in extra-legal activities. Following an unsuccessful campaign to rename Talbot Street in Dublin to Seán Treacy Street, the party took matters into their own hands, defacing the official street-signs and attaching replacements of their own. They beheaded the monument to Hugh Gough, 1st Viscount Gough in the Phoenix Park and played a major part in sparking the VE Day riots in Dublin after Trinity College students raised the Union Jack and Soviet Union banners in celebration of the Allied victory in World War II.

=== Split and decline ===
Dissent began to grow in the party towards Ó Cuinneagáin's extremism and hostility to other political parties, and Aiséirghe's minor success in the 1945 local elections convinced many members that the party had potential for success under a more moderate leader willing to co-operate with mainstream parties and politicians. Following internal disputes, a vote was held nominating Riobárd Breathnach to be the new party leader. Ó Cuinneagáin won the vote, but the entire Cork delegation resigned afterwards. The split was catastrophic for Aiséirghe as it caused many members in the party's Munster heartland to leave the party. The collapse of Aiséirghe left the path open for Clann na Poblachta, which shared some of its economic and cultural theories with the party but without the anti-democratic and anti-Semitic elements, to capitalise on political and economic disaffection towards the Fianna Fáil government. Many disillusioned Aiséirghe members defected to Clann na Poblachta.

On the morning of 14 May 1949, in an attempt to gain back the ground that was lost by the split and the rise of Clann na Poblachta, posters saying "Arm Now to Take the North." were put up by the party in Dublin and other large towns. The Gardaí responded by tearing down the posters. This only drew further attention to the spectacle which was reported on by newspapers throughout both Ireland and Britain. The party's brief notoriety did not last, as Ó Cuinneagáin was unable to follow up on his call to action. Many of the new followers he had recruited by this tactic soon left.

Ailtirí na hAiséirghe held its last formal meeting in 1958, though the party newspaper, Aiséirghe, continued to appear until the early 1970s.

== Ideology ==
The party wished to create a fascist one-party state ruled by a leader known as a 'Ceannaire' (meaning Leader in Irish). A National Council consisting of a hundred deputies would be created to elect the Ceannaire while the county councils would be abolished and replaced by four provincial assemblies elected every three years on a vocational electoral roll. Each province would have a provincial governor appointed by the Ceannaire. The province of Ulster would consist of all nine counties, ensuring a Catholic voting majority, and its provincial capital would be Dungannon, chosen due to its being the former seat of the O'Neill dynasty.

Aiséirghe promised full employment, an end to emigration (by making it a criminal offence to leave the country), discrimination against Jews and freemasons, and the reconquest of Northern Ireland by a massive conscript army. It also promised to make the use of the English language in public illegal after five years in power. The party frequently cited the Portuguese Estado Novo as an inspiration for their corporatist ideals. Despite their opposition to socialism, they occasionally praised the economic achievements of the Soviet Union and the communist rejection of liberal democracy.

The party intended for the state to stay out of World War II until the participants were worn out, after which Ó Cuinneagáin believed that Ireland, connecting Europe and America and having escaped the secular philosophies that had influenced other European nations after the French Revolution, would emerge as a spiritual leader to the world and re-Christianise Europe as it had after the fall of the Roman Empire, by showing that Christianity could be fully reconciled with the demands of a modern industrial society. While a minority of party members agreed with Ó Cuinneagáin's geopolitical vision, most were more concerned with practical issues such as ending emigration and partition, regarding the idea of an Irish re-Christianisation of Europe as being merely grandiloquent rhetoric.

A central plank of Aiséirghe was its focus on the revival of the Irish language, viewing it as not only as an expression of cultural distinctiveness but also an instrument in which the party's ideals could be communicated to the Irish people. From the day of the party's ascension to power, all official business was to be conducted in Irish and no civil servant under thirty retained who was not fluent with the language. Those making representations to the government were to be denied a hearing unless they pleaded their case in Irish. A register of Irish-speaking households was to be compiled, with members of such households accorded positive discrimination. A heavy stamp duty was to be imposed on all notices in English and all streets, towns and business names would be required to be in Irish. Though English was to be tolerated "for a reasonable time" in the case of the Catholic Church, even sermons, pastoral letters and other communications by the Church would soon be required to incorporate passages in Irish. In addition, all foreign monuments and memorials were to be destroyed, all names of Irish citizens were to be Gaelicised, and the use of titles associated with the British monarchy or aristocracy would be forbidden.

A group called "Aontacht na gCeilteach" (Celtic Unity) was established in November 1942, to promote a pan-Celtic vision. It was headed by Éamonn Mac Murchadha. MI5 believed it to be a front for Ailtirí na hAiséirghe, intended to serve as "a rallying point for Irish, Scottish, Welsh and Breton nationalists". The group had the same postal address as the party. At its foundation the group stated that "the present system is utterly repugnant to the Celtic conception of life" and called for a new order based upon a "distinctive celtic philosophy". Ailtiri na hAiseirghe was sympathetic to Pan-Celticism and had established contacts with pro-Welsh independence political party Plaid Cymru and Scottish independence activist Wendy Wood. Party activists put up posters in South Dublin city that said "Rhyddid i gCymru" (Freedom for Wales).

=== Attitude towards Protestantism ===
Despite Aiséirghe's strong nationalism and inspiration from the Papal Encyclicals, the party was tolerant of Protestantism, using Christian rather than Catholic terminology. Ernest Blythe, an Ulster Protestant former government minister, was an influential supporter of the party. Risteárd Ó Glaisne, a Methodist, said of Ó Cuinneagáin that "his attitude to Protestantism was not only unsectarian but unpatronising". Ó Cuinneagáin believed the establishment of a Christian corporatist order would appeal to Protestants as well as Catholics and that majority-Protestant educational institutions like Trinity College Dublin could be used as "an effective instrument towards winning the loyalty of the descendants of that section of our countrymen". Despite this, Ó Cuinneagáin was prepared to use ethnic cleansing against any of the mostly Protestant Irish unionists who resisted inclusion in an Irish state, and to replace them with members of the Irish diaspora.

== Political support ==
Its supporters included former Cumann na nGaedheal government ministers Ernest Blythe and J. J. Walsh (Blythe had also been a leading member of the Blueshirts), and Irish Monetary Reform Association TD Oliver J. Flanagan. Seán Treacy, the future Labour Party TD and Ceann Comhairle of Dáil Éireann, was a party member in the 1940s, as were the novelist Brian Cleeve, the Daoist philosopher Wei Wu Wei and the broadcaster and author Breandán Ó hEithir. Although never a member, Seán South was familiar with the group's publications. Other sources have stated that South was either a member or supporter of Ailtirí na hAiséirghe. Máirtín Ó Cadhain, though not a member, advised in 1945 that the IRA's arms should be handed over to Aiséirghe. Kathleen Clarke contributed financially to the party, but later switched her support to Clann na Poblachta. Nora Ashe was also a major financial contributor to Aiséirghe.

Aiséirghe candidate Tomás Ó Dochartaigh stated in a speech that while campaigning for the party in Tipperary during 1944, he found common ground between himself and Dan Breen. After the election, Breen reportedly said that "he was sorry Ailtirí na h-Aiseirighe had not done better, that he had studied their program and that there was a lot to commend."

=== Relationship with Irish republicanism ===
Ó Cuinneagáin made strong efforts to court Irish republicans, providing film screenings, books, gramophone records and Aiséirghe literature to republican internees and becoming a prominent member of the Green Cross Fund which helped send financial assistance to the families of republican prisoners. Prior to founding the party Gearóid Ó Cuinneagáin had led Aicéin, the youth wing of the republican party Córas na Poblachta and had helped secure the presidency of Conradh na Gaelige for the IRA internee Seán Ó Tuama. He had also been a writer for An tÉireannach and the Wolfe Tone Weekly. As a result, he could claim to be a member of the Irish republican community and had developed close relationships with Irish republicans over the years.

Tarlach Ó hUid, editor of IRA newspaper War News and co-founder of the Irish Republican Radio station became an active member of the party as did Gearóid Ó Broin, a member of the IRA Army Council. IRA Adjutant-General, Tomás Ó Dubhghaill, gave the party his approval. An IRA internee in the Curragh reported to Roger McHugh that many of his fellow internees supported Ó Cuinneagáin. In 1943 Francis Stuart, speaking on the German propaganda broadcast Redaktion-Irland, urged Irish voters to support Aiséirghe and Córas na Poblachta. An Irish soldier who joined the movement reported that the Dublin branch consisted entirely of "Nazis and people who were in the IRA". G2 and MI5 noted that Aiséirghe members were often found attending Sinn Féin meetings and speaking from their platforms along with the fact several Aiséirghe officials had Sinn Féin pedigrees.

Tensions sometimes developed between the Irish Republican Army and Aiséirghe. When Tomás Óg Ó Murchadha criticised the IRA in 1944, many Balbriggan party members who were also members of the IRA resigned. Some Aiséirghe activists resented the IRA for their lack of focus on the revival of the Irish language. The leader of the Cork organisation, Seosamh Ó Coigligh, accused Ó Cuinneagáin in a letter criticising him of causing the party to be regarded as an appendage of the IRA and Sinn Féin.

== Election results ==
Due to financial issues, commercial poster sites being reserved by mainstream parties, a lack of preparation, many of their members being too young to vote, and indecision over constituencies and candidates the party obtained no seats in the 1943 and 1944 general elections.

In the 1945 local government elections, however, Aiséirghe candidates won nine seats (out of 31 contested), gaining a total of more than 11,000 first-preference votes. Despite the end of World War 2 and newsreel footage of the Holocaust being shown in Ireland, 1945 saw little change in pro-Axis sentiment among the Irish public along with some anger towards the Allies due to a wave of unbanned Allied war films being shown which came across as triumphalist, the VE Day riots in Dublin, and the bombing of Hiroshima and Nagasaki. In addition the lifting of the Emergency Powers Act allowed Aiséirghe to place their program before the public without censorship and effort was put into preparing for the polls and addressing local concerns by constituents. However all of the seats gained by the party, with the exception of County Louth, were in Munster, showcasing the gaps in the party's organisation. The Drogheda Independent described the result as a "remarkable advance" that had "come as a big surprise to the majority of citizens".

=== Dáil Éireann ===
| Election | Seats won | ± | Position | First Pref votes | % |
|---|---|---|---|---|---|
| 1943 | 0 / 144 | Steady | ▲7th | 3,137 | 0.2% |
| 1944 | 0 / 144 | Steady | 7th | 5,809 | 0.5% |
| 1948 | 0 / 144 | Steady | ▼8th | 322 | 0.0% |

=== Local elections ===
| Election | Seats won | ± |
|---|---|---|
| 1945 | 9 / 309 | Steady |
