= Al Porter =

Irish entertainer

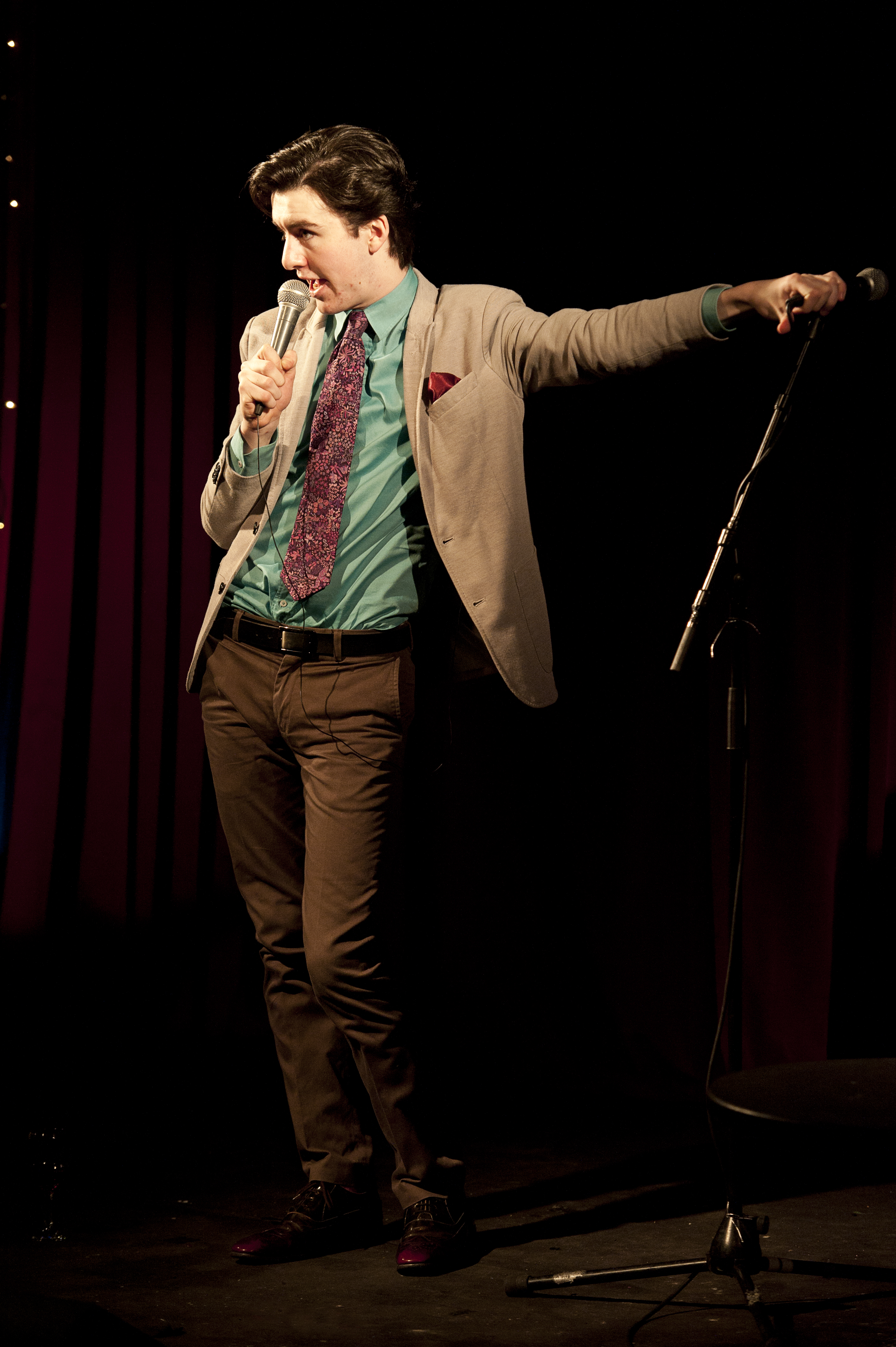
- Al Porter on stage
- Born: 6 January 1993 (age 33); Tallaght, Dublin, Ireland

Comedy career
- Years active: 2013–2017, 2022–

Al Porter (born Alan Kavanagh, 6 January 1993) is an Irish comedian, actor, pantomime star, writer and radio broadcaster.

== Career ==
=== Acting ===
Porter has been acting since he was 10 years old, and has starred in several Christmas Pantomime productions in the Olympia Theatre in Dublin in the past.

=== Comedy ===
By the time he was 22 he was also able to sell out Dublin comedy venue Vicar Street for 3 nights as the headline act.

In August 2016, while performing at the Edinburgh Festival he was described as a "former panto star" by The Guardian. However The Guardian joined The London Standard in giving his show a positive review. He is currently working again as a comedian after a hiatus following allegations of sexual assault.

=== Radio host ===
In 2017, it was announced that Porter would be joining Today FM and taking over the 12pm-2:30pm slot. Porter's show commenced on Monday 13 February 2017.

=== Television presenting ===
On 8 October 2017, Porter presented the new series of Blind Date on TV3.

On 18 November 2017 the Metro and the Irish edition of The Times reported that Porter has been subject to four allegations from people within the comedy industry of sexual misconduct. On the same day his radio employer Today FM released a statement saying that they had spoken with Porter and his management team concerning the allegations. Later that day a spokesperson for Porter said he has agreed to "take some personal time from his lunchtime radio show."

The following day Porter revealed that he resigned from Today FM, with immediate effect, and that he was "completely taken aback by reports in the media". He also expressed his gratitude to Today FM, the Olympia Panto and TV3 for granting him “the space and time” to deal with the situation.

Porter was accused of sexually assaulting a patient at St Patrick's University Hospital during an October 2015 visit, though two investigations revealed no evidence of sexual assault, Porter released a statement expressing that he was pleased with the findings. The Gardaí investigated an alleged sexual assault against a male in his late teens in 2016. In November 2019, this charge was dropped.

== Obstructing arrest ==
On 6 October 2019, Al Porter was arrested in the early morning for obstructing an arrest on Camden Street. A group of young men began shouting at Gardaí on patrol in Wexford Street. Gardaí stopped the men and were arresting one of them when Porter intervened saying "No" and "he did not think he should be arrested". He was arrested for "interfering with the arrest". His defence council said that he was "trying to be the peacemaker" and that it was "a momentary aberration". He pleaded guilty to obstructing arrest and Judge Flann Brennan said that in mitigation the defendant pleaded guilty at the first opportunity and he was very apologetic. He also noted that the defendant had no prior convictions and had not come to further Garda attention. He warned Porter “Mr Kavanagh, don’t do anything as foolish as this again, mind your own business in future”. He also said "I will find the facts proven and dismiss. This is the only time I will give you a chance”. Al Porter thanked the judge and left the court.
