= Gearóid Ó Cuinneagáin =

Northern Irish politician (1910–1991)

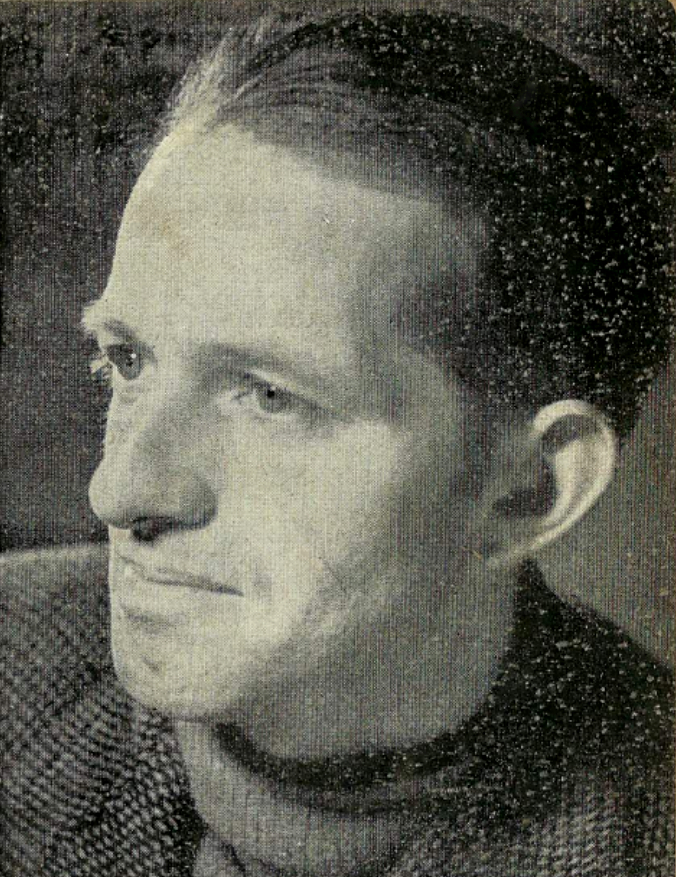
- Ó Cuinneagáin in 1942

Leader of Ailtirí na hAiséirghe

Ceannaire (Leader)
- In office 1942–1958

Personal details
- Born: John Gerald Cunningham; 2 January 1910 Belfast, Ireland
- Died: 13 June 1991 (aged 81)
- Party: Ailtirí na hAiséirghe (1942–1958)
- Spouse: Síle Ní Chochláin
- Children: 6
- Occupation: Civil servant, writer, tax advisor, politician

Gearóid Ó Cuinneagáin (born John Gerald Cunningham; 2 January 1910 – 13 June 1991) was an Irish language activist, Irish nationalist and far-right politician born in Belfast, Ireland. He was the founder and leader of Ailtirí na hAiséirghe, a fascist party which sought to create a Christian corporatist state and revive the Irish language through the establishment of an authoritarian dictatorship in Ireland.

== Early life and education ==
John Gerald Cunningham was born on 2 January 1910, to John Cunningham, a restaurant manager, and Catherine (Kate) McMahon, of 31 Sandhurst Gardens in the Stranmillis district of Belfast. His father was from County Armagh and his mother, who could speak Irish, from County Down. Gearóid had four sisters and two brothers. His brother Seósamh (Joseph) became a solicitor who also went on to fight in the Spanish Civil War for the Nationalists with Eoin O'Duffy's Volunteers, while his brother Tomás went on to become a Catholic priest.

He attended St. Malachy's Christian Brothers School. He gained third place nationwide in the Irish civil service examinations in 1927 and earned matriculation to Queen's University Belfast. He rejected an offer from his father to finance his university studies and instead accepted an appointment in the Irish Department of Finance, being posted to Athlone. There he renewed acquaintance with Patrick Lenihan, one of his former teachers at St. Malachy's. Inspired by Lenihan, a cultural nationalist, he changed his name from Gerald Cunningham to its Gaelic form, Gearóid Ó Cuinneagáin.

Ó Cuinneagáin was later posted to Castlebar and Dublin and was appointed Junior Executive Officer in the Department of Defence. In 1932, he requested three months of unpaid leave to attend an Irish language immersion programme in Ranafast, but was turned down. In response he resigned in July and spent the following year in Ranafast, emerging a fluent Irish speaker.

Ó Cuinneagáin's command of the language earned him a position in 1933 as an editorial writer of the Republican Congress's Irish language newspaper An tÉireannach, publishing some of the articles under the pseudonym "Immaculate Virgin". After some months, however, he resigned, seeking a more reliable form of income and possibly coming to disagree with the newspaper's socialist views. In 1937, he became a partner in a small tax-consulting venture, Ó Cuinneagáin & Cooke.

== Pro-Axis underground ==
In 1937, he wrote an article in the conservative republican Wolfe Tone Weekly calling for an alliance between Ireland and Italy against their common enemy, the United Kingdom. He called for a large-scale military build-up, hoping that the power of a strong Ireland combined with the influence of the Irish diaspora might sway Mussolini to assist the Irish cause. At this point, however, Ó Cuinneagáin was not yet a fascist, stating in the article that Ireland need not be a fascist state and instead envisioning Ireland as a democratic republic based on the United States, with an economic programme inspired by Roosevelt's New Deal.

In 1939, recognising that war between Britain and Germany was imminent, he called on Irish people to "make use of this other great danger facing England to benefit our country". In an unpublished manifesto written in spring 1940, "Ireland a Missionary-Ideological State?" he advocated the establishment of a corporate state which would combine faith and modernity, rejecting the "materialism" of capitalism and communism.

In 1940 Ó Cuinneagáin was involved in the establishment of Clann na Saoirse, which was connected to the pro-Axis organisations Irish Friends of Germany and Cumann Náisiúnta. These had been set up by Easter Rising veteran and former Blueshirt W.J. Brennan-Whitmore with the goal of creating a corporate state in Ireland. Ó Cuinneagáin was appointed Stiúrthóir (director) in May and issued an eight-point programme calling for the military reclamation of Northern Ireland, pro-natalist policies, a ban on emigration, the elimination of the "pernicious influence of aliens" on Irish economic life, the establishment of a "sovereign federation" of the Celtic nations (Ireland, Scotland, Wales and Brittany), and the prohibition of the English language.

Following the discovery of Plan Kathleen, the Irish government had the principal members of Clann na Saoirse, the Irish Friends of Germany, and Cumann Náisiúnta arrested. Ó Cuinneagáin was not arrested, as his involvement with the movement was not public knowledge. The detainees were released a few days later. The Irish Friends of Germany and Cumann Náisiúnta began to organise meetings planning to assist a German invasion under the cover of Irish-language classes taught by Ó Cuinneagáin. In September, however, he announced his plans to leave the organisation to instead form a branch of Conradh na Gaeilge known as Craobh na hAiséirghe (Branch of the Resurrection) which would be "a Hitler Youth Movement under the guise of an Irish class".

Two days later, Irish security forces raided the houses of members of the Irish Friends of Germany and Cumann Náisiúnta. Again Ó Cuinneagáin escaped arrest as the Irish authorities did not realise that "Séamus Cunningham", "Jerry Cunningham" and Gearóid Ó Cuinneagáin, three of the names by which he was known, were the same person.

== Craobh na hAiséirghe ==
Craobh na hAiséirghe claimed to be a non-political and non-ideological organisation dedicated to the preservation of the Irish language and culture, and many of its members had no interest in fascism. Their membership grew at a rapid rate, numbering within a year 1,200 and 1,500 adherents. At Craobh na hAiséirghe's second meeting Ó Cuinneagáin was elected president of the organisation but within a few weeks changed his original title to Ceannaire, meaning "leader". Ó Cuinneagáin copper-fastened his authority and established absolute powers of direction over the organisation.

He became involved with the pro-German republican party Córas na Poblachta and assumed the leadership of its youth wing Aicéin (Action) until Aicéin's independence was ended in February 1942. For Ó Cuinneagáin, association with the party allowed him to gain recruits for Craobh na hAiséirghe and make connections with the Irish Republican Army, in addition to the possibility of influencing Córas' policy ideologically.

In 1941, Ó Cuinneagáin was elected to Conradh na Gaeilge's national executive, the Coiste Gnótha, but became involved in a dispute with other members of the executive over a proposed Conradh commemorative publication of the 1916 Easter Rising, as Ó Cuinneagáin insisted that a member of Craobh na hAiséirghe be appointed editor of the issue. Ó Cuinneagáin's attempts to pack the leadership of Conradh failed to work, as only he and Proinsias Mac an Bheatha were elected to its council. His two bids for presidency of Conradh na Gaeilge likewise failed. Afterwards he commenced a boycott of Conradh, prohibiting Craobh delegates from participating in the Coiste Gnótha and withholding the annual fee due from the branch.

In June 1942, a convention was organised in Donaghpatrick to commemorate the centenary of the founding of The Nation newspaper by Young Ireland. Ó Cuinneagáin was invited to give an address, in recognition of his work on behalf of the Irish language. His two-hour speech was a political one that strongly criticised Irish society and its leadership but praised the Emergency Powers Act for helping to prepare Ireland for totalitarian government. He announced the formation of a new political movement alongside Craobh na hAiséirghe to be known as Ailtirí na hAiséirghe.

The speech brought to a head dissent growing at the increasingly political stance of the branch as many of the branch's members were civil servants or otherwise worked for the state which Ó Cuinneagáin now expressed his wish to overthrow. The publication of Aiseirghe 1942, which was devoted purely to laying out Ó Cuinneagáin's political vision for his new movement, similar to the eight-point programme he had issued as a member of Clann na Saoirse, exacerbated these tensions.

On November 6, 1942, at the annual Craobh na hAiseirghe meeting, the organisation split amicably, with the culturalists under Proinsias Mac an Bheatha adopting the new name of Glún na Buaidhe (Generation of Victory) and agreeing to assume Craobh na hAiséirghe's debts. In his final address as leader of the branch, Ó Cuinneagáin pledged his co-operation with its objectives and asked members to assist Glún na Buaidhe.

== Ailtirí na hAiséirghe ==
Ó Cuinneagáin and his movement began to hold speeches where crowds of people might be found such as pubs, cinemas, sporting events and churches as well as to organise parades and Irish dancing. Aiséirghe speakers would deliver a speech in Irish before switching to English, something which, according to Aindrias Ó Scolaidhe, one of Ó Cuinneagáin's deputies, aroused the curiosity of crowds. Ó Cuinneagáin became a frequent speaker at campus events, even proselytising in the pro-Unionist environment of Trinity College.

Ó Cuinneagáin courted the support of Irish republicans with whom he had developed close relationships during his time in Conradh na Gaeilge and Córas na Poblachta. He was prominent in the Green Cross Fund which helped provide financial assistance to the families of republican internees and he began to arrange film screenings for and provide books, gramophone records and Aiséirghe literature to IRA internees. Several prominent IRA volunteers including Gearóid Ó Bróin, a member of the IRA Army Council, joined Ó Cuinneagáin or expressed their approval of the party. The Irish intelligence service G2 and its British counterpart MI5 began to note that Aiséirghe members often attended Sinn Féin meetings and sometimes even spoke from their platforms.

The party was unprepared for the 1943 Irish general election and won no seats. In an attempt at a publicity stunt two weeks before the election Ó Cuinneagáin organised an Aiséirghe céilí in Belfast and gave a fiery speech during it, hoping to be arrested and gain press coverage as a "political prisoner." As he predicted the Royal Ulster Constabulary immediately broke up the event and took Ó Cuinneagáin into custody. However, he was released forty-eight hours later, denying him the press coverage for which he had hoped. The party's support in Northern Ireland was devastated as in the weeks as following the incident Aiséirghe members in Northern Ireland were visited by the RUC and given the choice of resigning from Aiséirghe or being interned under the Special Powers Act.

== American Note Crisis ==
In February 1944 the American Note crisis took place when the American minister to Ireland, David Gray, dispatched a communiqué to Éamon de Valera demanding the closure of legations belonging to the Axis powers in Dublin. Fearing this to be the diplomatic prelude to an invasion of Ireland by the Allies, the Irish government placed the army on high alert and rushed troops to the border. As a result, the two Allied governments were forced to clarify that the communiqué had been a request rather than an ultimatum and that they had no intention of violating Irish neutrality.

The Cork and Waterford organisations of Aiséirghe pledged their support for the Taoiseach in withstanding Allied pressure. To their exasperation, though, Ó Cuinneagáin instead used the opportunity to attack the Fianna Fáil government. Internal dissent began to grow against Ó Cuinneagáin's leadership. Ernest Blythe, criticising Ó Cuinneagáin's limitations as a public speaker, suggested that he should resign as Ceannaire while remaining Secretary or Director of Organisation. Seosamh Ó Coigligh, the leader of the Cork organisation of the party, believing that Ó Cuinneagáin's attacks on respected mainstream political leaders alienated many potential supporters from the movement, sent a letter to him on behalf of the Cork executive harshly criticising his attacks on the government and his irredentism which, in Ó Coigligh's view, caused Aiséirghe to be regarded as merely an appendage of the IRA and Sinn Féin.

De Valera's prestige soared as a result of the crisis which he took advantage of by calling a general election in May. Despite clear signs that the election would result in a sweeping victory for Fianna Fáil and the party suffering financial issues Ó Cuinneagáin was determined that Aiséirghe should run candidates. The party again failed to gain any seats in the 1944 Irish general election.

== Post-Emergency ==
The end of the war resulted in the lifting of the Emergency Powers Act which allowed Aiséirghe to place its programme before the public without censorship. In addition during the 1945 Irish local elections effort was put into preparing for the polls and addressing local concerns by constituents. As a result, Aiséirghe candidates won nine seats. With the exception of County Louth, their gains were confined to Munster, showcasing the gaps in their national organisation.

Throughout the second half of 1945 Ó Cuinneagáin depicted the result of the elections as a success for Aiséirghe. For many in the party like Tómas Ó Dochartaigh, the election's result showed that the party had potential for success with a more moderate and less dictatorial leader open to building bridges with mainstream parties and politicians. In August Ó Dochartaigh and Seán Ó hUrmoltaigh met with Ó Cuinneagáin laying out their complaints which he dismissed as trivialities. Following an ignored request for a party executive meeting Ó Dochartaigh threatened to convene such a meeting without Ó Cuinneagáin's permission. In response Ó Cuinneagáin suspended Ó Dochartaigh and Ó hUrmoltaigh from the movement for insubordination.

The party executive censured Ó Cuinneagáin at a meeting in September for exceeding his authority by suspending Ó Dochartaigh and Ó hUrmoltaigh, and reinstated the latter. Ó Cuinneagáin responded by dismissing Ó Coigligh and Muiris Mac Gearailt, the head of the Tipperary organisation, from their positions a week after the meeting. Dissidents in the movement led by officers of the Cork City branch nominated Riobárd Breathnach for a new Ceannaire.

At a party convention held in October a vote was held with twenty-two officials backing Ó Cuinneagáin's continued leadership and thirteen supporting Riobárd Breathnach, in addition to one abstention and one spoiled ballot. Following the vote Tómas Ó Dochartaigh and the entire Cork delegation resigned. The split was a devastating blow for the party which caused many of Aiséirghe's supporters in Munster to resign in solidarity. The rise of Clann na Poblachta resulted in further defections. Ó Cuinneagáin was dismissive of the threat posed to Aiséirghe by the new party and viewed their rise in popularity as a passing phase. The 1948 Irish general election saw Aiséirghe gain no seats while Clann na Poblachta gained ten and joined John A. Costello's first coalition government.

Noting the dire state of the party organisation and morale Ó Cuinneagáin tried once more to gain publicity by antagonising Stormont. On May 13–14, 1949 Aiséirghe members put up posters saying "Arm Now to Take The North" in Dublin and other large towns. The Gardaí responded by tearing down the posters which only resulted in further attention being drawn to the spectacle. However, Ó Cuinneagáin was unable to follow up on his call to action and ultimately many of the followers he had briefly gotten from the incident went away disillusioned. The party's decline continued unabated and by 1950 it was all but defunct.

== Later life ==
Ó Cuinneagáin sparked a minor diplomatic incident in 1950 when in reaction to a tour of the United States and Canada by Basil Brooke his newspaper offered a £1,000 reward for Brooke's capture. Patrick Gordon Walker summoned the Irish ambassador to launch a protest on behalf of the British government.

Despite the decline of his party throughout the 1950s and 1960s sales of his newspaper Aiséirí remained strong, continuing to criticise the Irish government's language policies, party politics and foreign cultural influences. Ó Cuinneagáin also expressed an interest in technological advances and pointed ways in which they could be used to assist an Irish cultural and economic revival. In 1954 Ó Cuinneagáin launched the first Irish-language women's magazine, Deirdre.

He became favourable to the idea of a federal Europe and supported Irish entry into the European Economic Community. He welcomed the upswing in nationalism caused by the Troubles but deplored that the fight for Irish unity was left to a paramilitary movement instead of the Irish government. He continued to publish Aiséirí until 1975 when he discontinued the journal, being unable to pay the costs for publication. Despite this, Ó Cuinneagáin never abandoned his ideological convictions and in 1990 shortly before his death he startled Risteárd Ó Glaisne by saying "You think we're all washed up. We're not. You wait and see - our day is coming."
