= Dáil Courts =

Irish judiciary, 1920–1922

The Dáil Courts (also known as Republican Courts) were the judicial branch of government of the Irish Republic, which had unilaterally declared independence in 1919. They were formally established by a decree of the First Dáil on 29 June 1920, replacing more limited Arbitration Courts that had been authorised a year earlier. The Dáil Courts were an integral part of the Irish Republic's policy of undermining British rule in Ireland by establishing a monopoly on the legitimate use of force. They continued in operation until shortly into the life of the Irish Free State, which was established on 6 December 1922, after the approval of the Anglo-Irish Treaty.

== Precursor arbitration courts ==
The precursor of the Dáil Court system was a forum for arbitration commonly known as the Sinn Féin Court. In 1904, Arthur Griffith had reiterated the idea of National Arbitration Courts in every county:

… not less important to the nation than a National Civil Service are National Courts of Law. Hungary understood this and established Arbitration Courts, which superseded the courts which Austria sought to impose upon her. Ireland, before O'Connell retreated from the proposal of erecting a de facto Irish Parliament in Dublin, had established such courts. I say it to my countrymen, as The Nation said to them in 1843, "You have it in your power to resume popular courts and fix laws, and it is your duty to do so. If you resort in any of your disputes to any but your own judges, you injure yourselves and commit treason to your country."

At a meeting of the Ministry of Dáil Éireann on 23 June 1919, it was decided to set up a committee on Arbitration Courts. Unlike the rules that then regulated who could become a Justice of the Peace, women were expressly eligible to become judges in the new courts. The general idea of Parish and District Courts on the lines of those then operating in South County Mayo, County Galway and West County Clare was approved. The Parish Courts were usually arbitrated by local Irish Republican Army, Catholic clergy, or Sinn Féin figures who had authority in the area. In appearance they were less formal than the British civil courts and its officers did not wear regalia associated with the legal profession of the time such as gowns and wigs. They filled a vacuum created by the conflict, and sought to persuade people who were inclined to fear the IRA's revolutionary nature that an independent Ireland would not set aside personal and property rights. During the war, the courts gradually extended their influence across most of the country, usurping the British law courts as the British government lost its authority in the eyes of the majority.

On 4 March 1920, Austin Stack submitted a report regarding "courts with coercive jurisdiction". However, he did not think that it was yet feasible to make them immediately operational and pointed out that the Dáil Decree, (Decree No. 8, Session 4, 1919) only provided for Arbitration Courts. The Dáil Courts replaced the Sinn Féin Arbitration Courts, authorised in June 1919. The latter, only fully operational in the west of Ireland and with limited jurisdiction in property disputes, had been coming under pressure to try criminal cases. The critical difference between the two systems was the power to adjudicate assumed by the new courts regardless of the wishes of the parties. While the Arbitration Courts could have been characterised as within the tradition of contract law, the latter assumed powers of coercion characteristic of a state. The new system of Dáil Courts established on 29 June 1920 was therefore much more ambitious and more geographically widespread than its predecessor. A proposed amendment, by Ulster deputies Joseph O'Doherty and Ernest Blythe, to remove the right of clergymen to sit as ex-officio members, was defeated.

The first meeting of a Sinn Féin/republican court was in Ballinrobe, South Mayo. In his witness statement, (Bureau of Military History) William T. O'Keeffe, a Staff Officer with the South Mayo Brigade, IRA, credited men from the Claremorris Battalion, Commandant P.R. Hughes in particular (Hughes was Officer in Command of IRA Intelligence and Communications and later appointed one of the first District Justices of the Irish Free State in 1923) along with solicitor Connor A. Maguire (who became a Barrister-at-Law in 1922, and who later served as Attorney General of the Irish Free State (1932), President of the High Court (1936) and Chief Justice (1946)) as being responsible for the establishment of the first Sinn Féin courts. Subsequently, Comdt. Hughes and Maguire sat as judges in the courts.

== Overview ==
Henry Hanna KC, of the High Court of the Irish Free State explained some of the reasons why the Dáil Courts successfully took root as follows:

Apart from the policy of undermining British rule in Ireland, there was a necessity for such throughout the country. Though the superior and County Courts under the British regime were still functioning, the Petty Sessions Courts, which depended on the co-operation of the Royal Irish Constabulary, the magistracy, and the British executive, had collapsed. The Royal Irish Constabulary had been compelled to withdraw from the outlying districts and stations to the larger towns, and had become an armed garrison rather than a civil police force. Many magistrates had resigned their Commissions of the Peace or had been removed from the same. Hence there was real work for these inferior Courts to do. The rival [Dáil] Courts were of a rough-and-ready character, and under much difficulty they decided the disputes of ordinary life more on the lines of common sense and neighbourliness than by strict law.

The system consisted of:

- Parish Courts, which dealt with the most minor civil and criminal matters,
- District Courts, which dealt with more serious civil and criminal matters and which heard appeals from the Parish Court,
- Circuit Courts composed of four circuits, with unlimited civil and criminal jurisdiction, and
- a Supreme Court, operating as both a court of first instance and an appellate court.

Judge Hanna, in his overview of the Courts, illustrated the anti-British nature of the 'movement' by referring to this provision of the Code of Rules of the Dáil Courts:

The law recognized on January 21, 1919, shall until amended continue in force, except such portion thereof as was clearly motivated by religious or political animosity...Without prejudice to the foregoing, pending the enactment of a Code by the Dáil, citations may be made to any Court from the early Irish Law Codes, or any commentary upon them in so far as they may be applicable to modern conditions and from the Code Napoléon or other codes, the Corpus Juris Civilis, or works embodying or commenting on Roman law; but such citations shall not be of binding authority. Save as aforesaid, no legal textbook published in Great Britain shall be cited to any Court.

== Disputes heard ==
The extent of the operation of the Dáil Court system may be judged from the fact that 900 Parish Courts and 77 District Courts came into operation. Among the offences dealt with by the courts were "rowdyism", larceny, breaches of the licensing laws, damage to property, 'abusive language towards women', bank and post-office robberies and assaults. Punishment for these offences varied, including the returning of stolen property, repairing damage, fines, and other means of restitution and awarding damages. Incarceration was not a commonly available option to the court during the conflict but it was imposed by the courts. The problem of incarceration then fell to the IRP despite the fact that no government funds were made available for costs incurred. Serious offences could merit exile from Ireland, which increased the workload of some British courts dramatically as those condemned sometimes resorted to the 'enemy courts'. Treason, as interpreted by the IRA, was punishable by death, and was not part of the Dáil courts' remit, being dealt with summarily by court-martial in absentia.

The laws and precedence of the Irish Republic were taken from the law that existed in Ireland on the day Dáil Éireann first sat (21 January 1919), with the addition of all Dáil decrees issued from that date. It was theoretically possible to cite Brehon, French and Roman law, although this rarely happened in practice. In areas where the presence of British forces was especially strong (such as County Cork), the courts only met intermittently. It was while presiding at a District Court on 12 August 1920, that Terence MacSwiney was arrested. The courts' rulings were enforced by both the Irish Republican Army and the Irish Republican Police (IRP), the former often viewing the courts as a distraction from what they considered their main task. The courts were important in bringing the IRA further under the authority of the Dáil in some parts, which hitherto had been little more than nominal, as some commanders were overly inclined to prize their autonomy.

== Efficacy ==
(To) Mr. A. Stack TD
Dec. 9th 1921, Lissard, Galbally, Co. Limerick
Sir, I beg to report to you that the decisions of the courts have not been carried out in this (Galbally) parish Co. Limerick, that there are decisions awaiting to be carried out for the past 1½ years and 12 months &c.I think that the Volunteer Officers in this District think it beneath their dignity as great military men to do the work of the courts or get it done.
(pg. 2)
These very gentlemen are very active when they beg to do a glaring piece of jobbery and to drag the courts into the gutter just at their inception. I have also to report that the volunteer police, here, are being actually discouraged and prevented from doing their duty by incompetent Officers.
Yours truly, John Leasey

Hostility to the courts was not confined to those against the Irish Republic. Peadar O'Donnell, a socialist and senior IRA officer in north-east County Donegal, attempted to subvert its decisions when he felt that the interests of large estate-holders were being upheld. He prevented Republican Police in his Brigade area from enforcing such judgements, particularly of the Land Arbitration Courts. O'Donnell's insubordination finally provoked the intervention of Headquarters.

After the Truce declared between the British and Irish sides in July 1921, the Dail Courts, which had largely been suppressed during hostilities, re-emerged across the country. Minister Austin Stack instructed local Sinn Fein and IRA leaders to set up and administer Courts in all localities and republican judges such as Diarmuid Crowley, who had been arrested in 1920 were released and were able to resume their work. It was during the Truce period that the republican courts took on much of the burden of administering justice throughout Ireland.

However difficulties also crept into the Dáil Court system. Abuses crept in, and in many instances litigants who anticipated an adverse decision in the British Courts resorted to the Dáil Courts to restrain their opponents from the continuance of the proceedings in the other Court. There were traces that the Dáil Courts were used as channels of corruption, and by persons not in search of justice but anxious for the obstruction of justice.

Soon after the outbreak of the Civil War, the Provisional Government suspended the Dail Courts. Then, on 26 July 1922, after they refused to observe an order for habeas corpus that was granted by Judge Diarmuid Crowley in July 1922 in favour of a son of George Plunkett, they abolished the Dail Courts by decree. Crowley, who had been appointed a judge of the republican courts in 1920, and imprisoned by the British was also imprisoned by the Provisional Government for issuing an arrest order for Free State Minister for Defence Richard Mulcahy.

During the Civil War itself, most of the country was effectively under martial law and suspects could be detained without trial by the military. Thereafter the Provisional Government resurrected the legal system largely as it had existed prior to 1919 in criminal and security cases. Judges included both those formerly appointed under the former British administration, and veterans of the Dail Courts such as Cahir Davitt and James Creed Meredith.

== Winding up ==
To deal with the anomalous state of affairs arising from there being two rival systems of courts, within months of its establishment the Executive Council of the Irish Free State appointed a Judicial Committee chaired by Lord Glenavy to decide upon the best system for the new state. The Executive Council then tabled and the Dáil passed the Dáil Éireann Courts (Winding Up) Act 1923. The full title of the Act summarises how the Dáil Courts were wound up:

An Act to provide for the appointment of Commissioners to dispose of cases which were pending in the Courts, established under the authority of Dáil Éireann, to establish a Register of decrees of such Courts, and to make other provisions for the purpose of winding up the Courts aforesaid and to afford relief in certain hardships and anomalies which have arisen.

The expression "Dáil Court" was defined under the Act as meaning:

any court which was constituted under a Decree made in the year 1920 by the Minister for Home Affairs purporting to act under the authority of the Dáil Eireann constituted to be the Government of Saorstát Eireann (trans. Irish Republic) by the members who were elected for constituencies in Ireland and who first assembled in a Parliament held in the Mansion House at Dublin on the 21st day of January, 1919.

The winding-up of the Dáil Courts was undertaken by Judicial Commissioners appointed under the Act over a two-year period. When only relatively few cases remained to be disposed of, the Judicial Commission was abolished and its jurisdictions and powers transferred to the High Court. During this period, the Courts of Justice Act, 1924 was debated and enacted, creating the Irish courts hierarchy that still largely exists.

== Representations in popular culture ==
- Seán Keating’s painting, A Republican Court, 1921, completed 1946, now hangs in Collins Barracks, Cork.
- Ken Loach's film The Wind That Shakes the Barley, features an extended fictional scene from a Dáil Court in session. The presiding judge, Lily, (Fiona Lawton), is undermined by Teddy O'Donovan, (Pádraic Delaney), the local senior IRA officer. Rather than enforcing the decision of the court, Teddy releases a convicted prisoner because he has been financing the purchase of rifles. He is publicly challenged by Lily to return to the Court, where the IRA rail against the Gombeen man's conviction (charging a poor old woman an exorbitant rate of interest). The script indicates how the more 'pragmatic' militants were prepared to subvert other institutions of the Republic when they deemed it expedient. This duplicity is a portent of the 'practicality versus principles' dilemma that soon leads to Civil War.

== Sources ==
- Casey, J.P (1970). "Republican Courts in Ireland 1919–1922". Irish Jurist. 5: 321–342.
- Casey, J.P. (1974). "The Genesis of the Dáil Courts". Irish Jurist. 9: 326–338.
- Davitt, Cahir (1970). "The Civil Jurisdiction of the Courts of Justice of the Irish Republic 1920–1922". Irish Jurist. 3: 321–342.
- Dept. of Home Affairs (1921). "Rules and Forms of Parish and District Court". Dept. of Justice Files H 140/5 also DE 47/17.
- Hanna, Henry (Justice); Pringle, A. Denis (1929). The Statute Law of the Irish Free State, 1922–1928. Dublin: Alex Thom & Company. ISBN 9781561695096. Republished, Gaunt, Incorporated, 1999 ISBN 978-1-56169-509-6
- Kotsonouris, Mary (1994). Retreat from Revolution: The Dáil Courts, 1920–24. Dublin: Irish Academic Press. ISBN 978-0-7165-2613-1.
- Kotsonouris, Mary (Winter 1992). "The Dáil Courts in Limerick" (PDF). The Old Limerick Journal. Archived from the original (PDF) on 22 November 2007.
- Kotsonouris, Mary (2004). The Winding Up of the Dáil Courts 1922–1925. Dublin: Four Courts Press. ISBN 978-1-85182-767-1.
- Laird, Heather (2005). Subversive Law in Ireland, 1879-1920: from Unwritten Law to Dáil Courts (PDF). Dublin: Four Courts Press. ISBN 9781851828760.
- Mansergh, Nicholas (1934). The Irish Free State - Its Government and Politics. London: George Allen & Unwin Ltd. ISBN 978-1-4067-2035-8. See Chapter XVII The Judicial System
- Ministry for Home Affairs; attrib. Childers, Erskine (1921). The Constructive Work of Dáil Éireann No.1- The National Police and Courts of Justice. Dublin: Talbot Press.
- O'Connor, (Sir) James (1915). Irish Justice of the Peace. Dublin: E. Pononby.
- Ó Drisceoil, Donal (2001). Peadar O'Donnell. Cork: Cork University Press. ISBN 978-1-85918-310-6.
- History of the law - 1691–present. Dublin: Courts Service of Ireland. Archived from the original on 24 August 2017.
- Sinder, Janet (2001). "Irish Legal History: An Overview and Guide to the Sources" (PDF). Law Library Journal. 93 (2): 231–260. Archived from the original (PDF) on 13 June 2010.
- Podcast by Mary Kotsonouris Thomas Davis Lectures RTÉ Archives. Scroll to No. 7.
- TheUndisciplined.com. "The Republican Dáil Courts: A Revolutionary Irish Legal System".
