= Soma Festival =

- Soma Festival
- Status: Active
- Genre: Festivals
- Frequency: Annually (July)
- Locations: Castlewellan, County Down, Northern Ireland
- Coordinates: 54.267°N 5.933°W
- Years active: 13
- Inaugurated: 14 July 2013
- Attendance: 15,000 (2016)
- Area: Ireland, Celtic nations, United Kingdom, United States
- Leader: Tíona McSherry (director)
- Organiser: The Soma Castlewellan Group

The Soma Festival (Sanskrit: सोम, or sóma, meaning drink of the Gods, see Soma (drink); Irish: Féile Soma) is an annual music, arts, and cultural festival. The festival includes concerts, musical performances, well-being activities, art exhibitions, food and drink stalls, language events, music workshops, and pub sessions. The festival began in 2013 and takes place in Castlewellan, County Down in Northern Ireland. The festival is directed by Tíona McSherry and run by a team of volunteers.

== History ==
=== 2013–2015 ===
The festival was established in 2013 with headline performances from The Olllam, Niamh Parsons and the John McSherry Band. Artists Lorcan Vallely and Barry Kerr exhibited at the festival. Glór Uachtar Tíre's Scoil Samhraidh Shéamuis Uí Néill, an annual Irish language weekend became part of the Soma programme and has been included on an annual basis since. In 2014, the festival received support from Down District Council, Ring of Gullion AONB and the Heritage Lottery Fund enabling them to expand their programme. The festival was headlined by Irish singer Cara Dillon, The Olllam, and Balkan Alien Sound.

In 2015, the festival was headlined by singer-songwriter Duke Special. Supported by the newly created Newry, Mourne and Down District Council supercouncil, the festival expanded greatly. Performers included Beoga, Moxie, Karen Matheson, Muireann Nic Amhlaoibh, Pauline Scanlon, John Spillane, John McSherry and Dónal O'Connor and an Irish language music and cabaret hosted by RTÉ Raidió na Gaeltachta presenter Rónán Mac Aodha Bhuí. Piper Paddy Keenan and singer Mary Dillon were among musicians giving workshops at the 2015 event.

=== 2016 onwards ===
In 2016 the festival received sponsorship from Tourism Northern Ireland. In that year, the festival featured performances from Lisa Hannigan, Eddi Reader, Dónal Lunny, Flook, Declan O'Rourke and Breaking Trad.

To celebrate NI Year of Food and Drink 2016, the Soma Festival initiated the now-annual Soma Taste Experience, bringing together artisan food and craft beer producers from County Down and around Ireland. Soma Body & Soul became another annual festival feature with well-being professionals offering free and paid activities over two days. The Soma Craft Fair market square was held in Castlewellan's Upper Square, with Soma Kids held in Lower Square. The 2016 Soma Festival was estimated to have attracted 15,000 participants, including more than 200 musicians, artists, well-being practitioners, entertainers, and cooks.

The 2017 festival took place from 12 to 16 July of that year. The planned 2019 line-up included KT Tunstall and Liam Ó Maonlaí.

In 2023, performers at the "10th Anniversary" Soma Festival included Andy Irvine, Dónal Lunny and Kíla.
