= Wexford Street =

Street in Dublin, Ireland

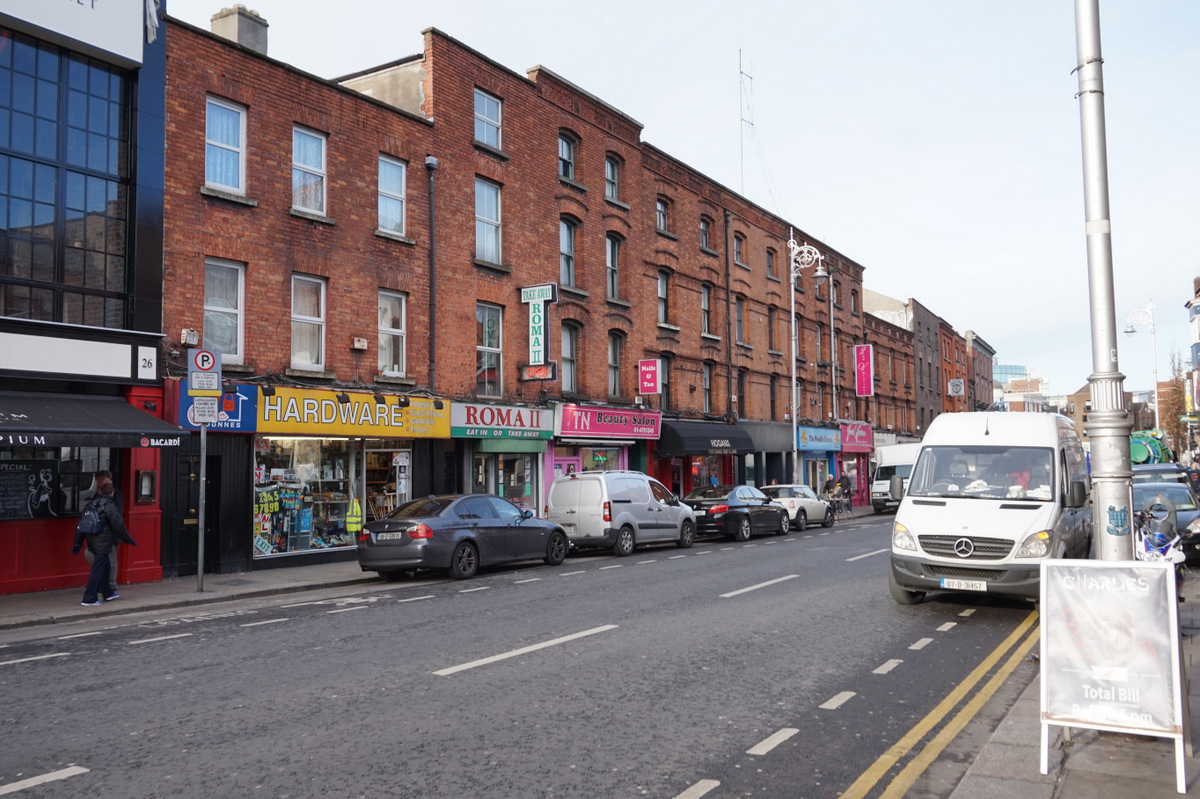
- Wexford Street

- Location within Central Dublin
- Native name: Sráid Loch Garman (Irish)
- Former names: Kevin's Port, Dale Street,
- Part of: R114
- Namesake: County Wexford and Kevin of Glendalough
- Length: 130 m (430 ft)
- Width: 18 metres (59 ft)
- Location: Dublin, Ireland
- Postal code: D02
- Coordinates: 53°20′13″N 6°15′56″W
- north end: Aungier Street
- south end: Camden Street

Other
- Known for: restaurants, pubs, Robert Tressell birthplace, Whelan's, The Village

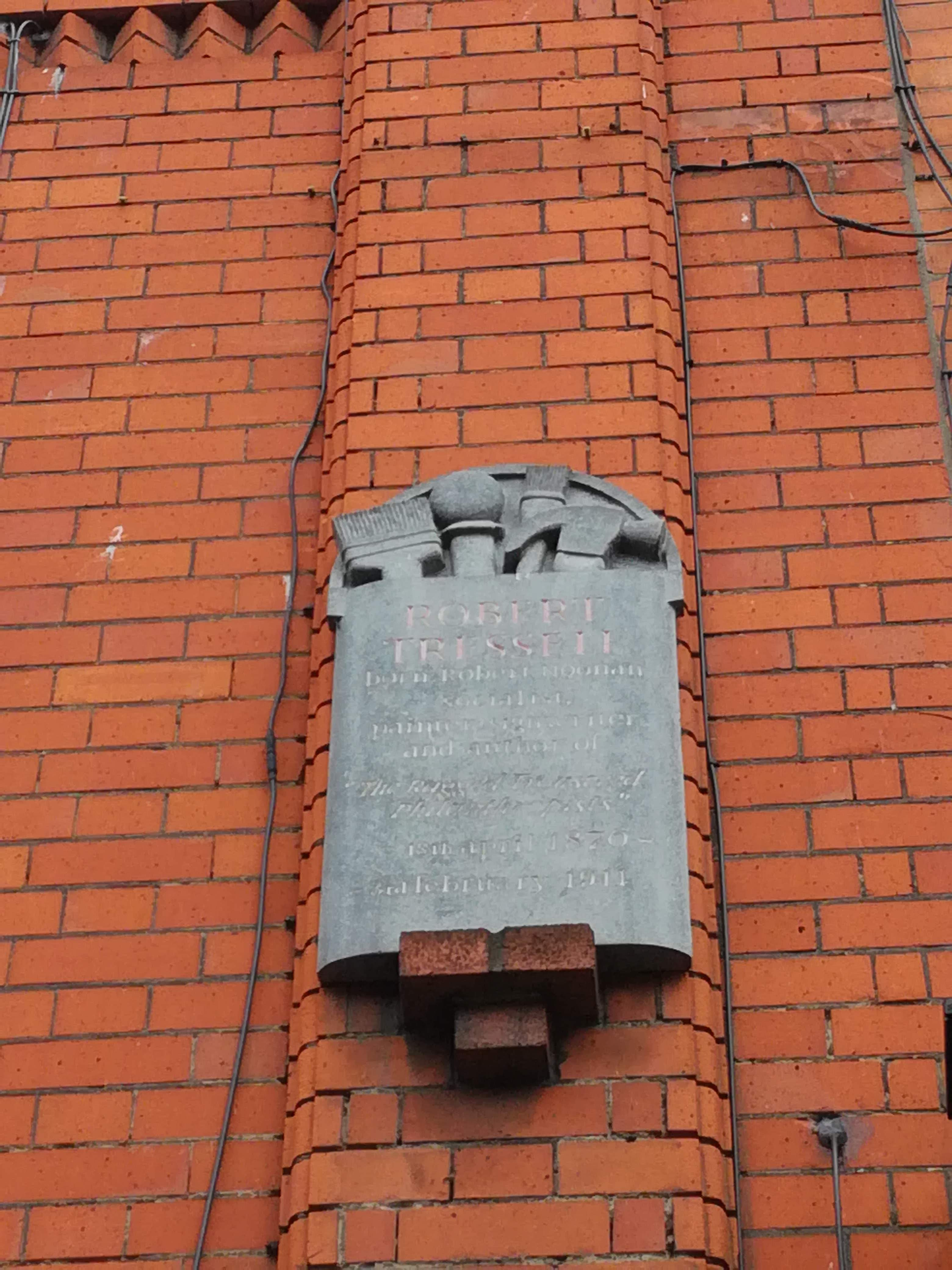
Plaque marking the birthplace of Robert Tressell at 37 Wexford Street.

Wexford Street (Irish: Sráid Loch Garman) is a street in southern central Dublin, Ireland, that connects Aungier Street to Camden Street.

== History ==
As early as 1326, St Kevin's Gate is recorded as being one of the gates into the city of Dublin. Later the street was known as "Kevin's Port" (also spelled "Kevan’s") a reference to nearby St. Kevin's Church and is detailed as such on the Down Survey map of 1655.

The street is shown with mostly farmland and orchards along its edges and without significant buildings in John Rocque's maps of Dublin around 1757. A gateway to the Manor of St. Sepulchre once stood on the street. The street acted as the main road to both Portobello and Milltown south of the city.

It was in the 18th century renamed as the route to County Wexford. In the 19th and early 20th century, the street was known for housing a number of Jewish businesses.

On 16 March 1921 it saw an incident of the Irish War of Independence: a troop lorry from Wellington Barracks, carrying British soldiers from the South Lancashire Regiment, was hit by two grenades thrown from Wexford Street, killing two soldiers (Lance Corporal Jarvis and Private G. Thomas) and wounding six others, one of whom, Private Whiting, died from his wounds. The British soldiers nicknamed the area where Wexford Street met Aungier Street "the Dardanelles" in reference to how dangerous it was due to frequent ambushes.

Whelan's is a well-known pub and music venue on the street; it dates back to 1772.

== Notable residents ==
- Robert Tressell was born on the street in 1870.
- Simon Donnelly was living on the street in 1911.
- Frank Kerlin grew up at 15 Wexford Street
- William Maple resided on the street from the 1740s
