= Anois =

Irish-language weekly newspaper

- Type: Weekly newspaper
- Format: Tabloid
- Publisher: Gael Linn
- Founded: September 1984
- Ceased publication: June 1996
- Language: Irish
- Headquarters: Dublin
- Country: Ireland
- Circulation: 5,600 (as of 1986)

Anois (Irish: Now) was an Irish-language weekly newspaper, published in Dublin, Ireland, by Gael Linn from September 1984 until June 1996. It was the first newspaper in the Irish language to appear in full-colour tabloid format. It focused primarily on Irish language issues, and included regular columns on sport and entertainment, as well as sections for children and learners.

Anois replaced two other Irish-language newspapers, Inniu and Amárach, and was itself replaced by Foinse in October 1996. It was financed by Roinn na Gaeltachta, as well as by sales and advertising. In 1986 its circulation stood at around 5,600, and about 4,500 in 1989.

== Notable contributors ==
- Máire Breatnach
- Rónán Mac Aodha Bhuí
- Tomás Mac Síomóin
- Gabriel Rosenstock
- Colm Ó Snodaigh
