= Inniu =

Irish-language Irish newspaper

- Type: Newspaper
- Format: Tabloid
- Editor: Ciarán Ó Nualláin (1943–79); Tarlach Ó hUid(1979–1984)
- Founded: 1943
- Ceased publication: 1984
- Language: Irish
- Headquarters: Merrion Square, Dublin 2.

Inniu (Irish: Today) was an Irish-language newspaper, published in Dublin, Ireland, from 17 March 1943 until 24 August 1984 when it was merged with the Galway-based publication Amárach to form a new weekly newspaper Anois, which started in September 1984.

== History ==
Initially the paper was a monthly publication but in April 1945 it changed to a weekly paper. The paper had offices on Merrion Square in Dublin and later in O'Connell Street. The paper was founded by Ciarán Ó Nualláin (who had worked for the Irish Independent and was the brother of Flann O'Brien) and Proinsias Mac an Bheatha who were disaffected with Conradh na Gaeilge and had formed a grouping called Glúin na Bua (Ulster spelling: Glún na Buaidhe).

Ciaran Ó Nualláin (1910-1983) remained as editor from its foundation until 1979, when he was succeeded by the assistant editor, Tarlach Ó hUid (1917-1990).

The loss of Irish Government financial support due to rationalisation led to the demise of the paper.

== See also ==
- Aiséirí
