= W.J. Brennan-Whitmore =

Irish revolutionary and journalist (1886–1977)

William James Brennan-Whitmore
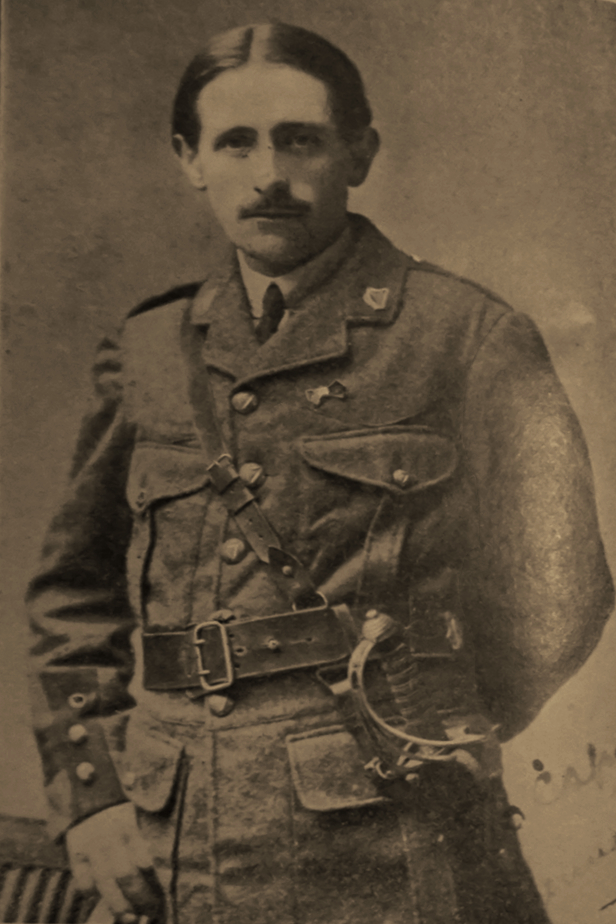
- Brennan-Whitmore, c. 1917
- Born: 21 October 1886; Wexford, County Wexford, Ireland
- Died: 27 December 1977 (aged 91); Meath Hospital, Dublin, Ireland
- Spouse: Anna Josephine Murphy
- Military career
- Allegiance: Irish Volunteers; Irish Republican Army; National Army; Defence Forces
- Service years: 1913–1927
- Rank: Commandant
- Conflicts: Easter Rising; Irish War of Independence; Irish Civil War

William James Brennan-Whitmore (21 October 1886 – 27 December 1977) was an Irish revolutionary, journalist and soldier. Joining the Irish Volunteers during the Home Rule Crisis, Brennan-Whitmore took part in the Easter Rising, Irish War of Independence and Irish Civil War, before becoming in later years an advocate of corporatism and fascism.

== Early life ==
William James Brennan-Whitmore was born in Wexford, Ireland on 21 October 1886 to Thomas Whitmore, a journalist and painter, and his wife Mary Brennan. His parents died when he was a child, leaving him in the custody of his maternal uncle John Brennan from Ferns, a supporter of Fenianism, and his wife Elizabeth. Brennan-Whitmore would later combine the names of his guardian families together in appreciation of his foster parents. Following his schooling, Brennan-Whitmore briefly took a job as a grocer's apprentice in Dublin before enlisting in the Royal Irish Regiment.

Serving in the Royal Irish Rifles, Brennan-Whitmore was deployed to the British Raj in the medical corps and at one point received a promotion to the rank of sergeant. He first began to develop Irish nationalist convictions from his conversations with an Irish missionary priest named Father John Mullan while on duty in the hills of The Himalayas. Brennan-Whitmore left the army in 1907 and returned to his home in County Wexford, becoming a journalist and a prominent member of local branches of the Gaelic League and Sinn Féin.

== Irish Volunteers ==
In 1913 Brennan-Whitmore joined the Irish Volunteers, becoming commander of the Ferns Battalion and being appointed adjutant of the North Wexford Brigade a year later. He struck up a close friendship with J.J. O'Connell, a national organiser of the Irish Volunteers, who personally introduced him to the organisation's leaders. Brennan-Whitmore began to be invited to meetings of the Irish Volunteers' military council, where he emphasised frequently the need to fully arm and train the Volunteers and to adapt their military strategies and organisational structure to Irish terrain and conditions, arguing alongside O'Connell for a focus on guerrilla warfare over conventional tactics. He wrote a training manual expounding his ideas, earning promotion to the general staff of the Irish Volunteers in April 1916.

An opponent of the existence of secret societies, Brennan-Whitmore was unaware of the Irish Republican Brotherhood's infiltration of the Irish Volunteers until the outbreak of the Easter Rising. He initially acted as aide to Joseph Plunkett at the beginning of the rising, where he encountered Michael Collins for the first time, forming a negative initial impression despite going on to work under Collins and support the treaty. Following the capture of the General Post Office, he was ordered by James Connolly to capture and fortify the Imperial Hotel and buildings on North Earl Street, which saw several exchanges of fire with British snipers but otherwise was the site of little fighting across the following days of the rising.

In the latter stages of the rising, Brennan-Whitmore was accorded the military rank of commandant among the Irish Volunteers, having been promoted to the position by a wounded Connolly. He considered the rebel leadership's defensive plan a wasted opportunity, believing instead that the seized buildings should have been lightly garrisoned so as to free up manpower to push British patrols out of the city, and that the organisation of a planned retreat into the countryside was feasible as an alternative to surrender. Retreating under heavy British bombardment as his command post and other buildings in the vicinity were set ablaze by shelling, Brennan-Whitmore and the group under his leadership became lost due to his lack of knowledge of the city of Dublin's layout. Brennan-Whitmore was ultimately wounded in the leg and captured on Moore Street by troops of the 3rd Royal Irish Regiment.

== Irish Republican Army ==
Brennan-Whitmore, alongside others who had taken part in the rebellion, was imprisoned in Frongoch internment camp in North Wales, where he was appointed camp adjutant to JJ O'Connell. He became closely associated with Michael Collins and Richard Mulcahy and lectured rebel officers on guerrilla warfare while also frequently challenged the British authorities to provide prisoner-of-war privileges to the Irish republican prisoners, efforts which often resulted in success. Upon his release from the internment camp Brennan-Whitmore returned to his career as a journalist and wrote an account of his time in Frongoch which was published in December 1917, With the Irish in Frongoch.

During the Irish War of Independence he served in the North Wexford Brigade of the Irish Republican Army and worked as an intelligence officer under Michael Collins. In 1920 he married Anna Josephine Murphy, who he would have four children with. He contributed articles to the IRA's official newspaper, An tÓglach, which he would become the editor of in 1923. Brennan-Whitmore supported the signing of the Anglo-Irish Treaty and was appointed as a commandant in the National Army, adjutant in Wexford and intelligence officer for Carlow in 1922. He was made brigade-adjutant to Emmet Dalton in July that year and in August transferred once again to South Wexford. In October 1924 he was assigned to the Intelligence Branch of GHQ before retiring from the military to settle down to become a farmer in the town of Gorey in March 1927.

== Politics ==
In his new residence of Gorey, Brennan-Whitmore established a local newspaper, the Record and a printing business named the Arcadian Press, through which he called for the replacement of parliamentary democracy with a corporatist state. Following the outbreak of World War II he wrote letter to the press expressing pro-Axis views and founded the Celtic Confederation of Occupational Guilds, a short-lived organisation which along with its successor Saoirse Gaedheal achieved little success despite being the recipient of funding from the Abwehr. Brennan-Whitmore additionally accompanied Eoin O'Duffy to a meeting with the Italian minister to Ireland, Vincenzo Berardis, regarding the formation of a corporatist party in Ireland, but considered O'Duffy to be mentally unbalanced and his flirting with the IRA to be a mistake. These activities brought Brennan-Whitmore to the attention of G2, whose reports described him as a "vain, superficially brilliant" figure whose "glib pen" and tongue would impress the inexperienced.

In 1940, Brennan-Whitmore founded a pro-German fascist party named Clann na Saoirse, which called for the military reclamation of Northern Ireland, pro-natalist policies, a ban on emigration, the elimination of the "pernicious influence of aliens" on Irish economic life, the establishment of a "sovereign federation" of the Celtic nations, and the prohibition of the English language under an eight-point planned drafted by the party's director Gearóid Ó Cuinneagáin, but this party proved short-lived as it was banned by the Irish government and its members arrested following the discovery of Plan Kathleen.

Despite his far-right views, Brennan-Whitmore became an active member of the left-leaning Clann na Poblachta, hoping that in government the new party would introduce financial reforms and break the de facto parity between Irish pound and the Sterling. In the 1960s he joined the Irish-Arab Society and was elected chairman, but was soon demoted due to his propagation of anti-semitic conspiracy theories in speeches and resigned in response. In 1968 he was a founder member of a far-right organisation known as the National Movement alongside A.L. Price and John Buckley. He was also rumoured to have been a member of the National Socialist Irish Workers Party.

== Later life ==
Brennan-Whitmore completed his memoir of his experiences during the Easter Rising, Dublin burning: the Easter rising from behind the barricades, in 1961. In a letter written to the Evening Herald in 1968, Brennan-Whitmore disputed the accepted story of Collins' assassination, alleging that Michael Collins had been assassinated by a British intelligence agent and implied Emmet Dalton was the supposed agent responsible. He endorsed the Provisional Irish Republican Army during The Troubles, arguing that he could not "see any difference, moral or legal, between the fight now being waged by the present generation I.R.A., and that waged by the I.R.A. of my generation. The objective of both is precisely the same - the liberation of our beloved country from foreign domination."

== Death ==
On 27 December 1977 Brennan-Whitmore died aged 91 at the Meath Hospital in Dublin.
