= Simon Donnelly (Irish republican) =

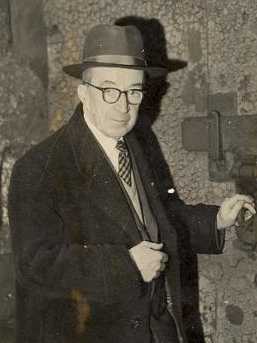

President of Córas na Poblachta
- In office 2 March 1940 – c. 1944

Personal details
- Born: 7 January 1891 Aungier Street, Dublin, Ireland
- Died: 7 December 1966 (aged 75) Dublin, Ireland
- Party: Córas na Poblachta
- Other political affiliations: Clann na Poblachta
- Military career
- Allegiance: (Republic of Ireland) Irish Republic
- Branch: Irish Republican Army
- Conflicts: Easter Rising; Irish War of Independence; Irish Civil War; Battle of Dublin

Simon John Donnelly (7 January 1891 – 7 December 1966) was a member of the Irish Republican Army and a founder member of both Córas na Poblachta and Clann na Poblachta.

== Biography ==
Donnelly was born at 7 Aungier Street, Dublin, the son of Timothy Donnelly, a master plumber, and Mary Brennan. He was the sixth of eight surviving children. The 1911 Census lists him living with his family at 34 Wexford Street. Apprenticed as a plumber, he became involved in the Irish Volunteers. During the Easter Rising of 1916 he was the commander of C Company of Éamon de Valera's command in Boland's Mill.

He was Vice-Commandant of the 3rd Battalion of the Dublin Brigade of the IRA during the War of Independence. On 10 February 1921 he was arrested. Four days later he escaped from Kilmainham Gaol along with Ernie O'Malley and Frank Teeling. Returning to his command in the IRA, he was appointed chief of the Irish Republican Police in mid-1921 as part of an attempt to enforce law and order in those areas of the country where the Royal Irish Constabulary had been forced out.

Donnelly took the anti-Treaty side in the Civil War and took part in the Battle of Dublin.

He founded the National Association of the Old IRA in an attempt to mend some of the rifts in the Republican Movement. He was a member of the provisional National Executive of the Republican Prisoners' Release Association.

On 2 March 1940, he was one of the founders of Córas na Poblachta and served as its president. He became a founding member of Clann na Poblachta in 1946.

As one of the most senior surviving veterans of the Rising, he played a prominent role in the 50th anniversary commemorations in 1966. He died on 7 December 1966.

== See also ==
- Patrick Moran (Irish republican)
