= Rónán Mac Aodha Bhuí =

Irish broadcaster (1970–2023)

- Born: 6 May 1970; Cork, County Cork, Ireland
- Died: 19 September 2023 (aged 53); Gweedore, County Donegal, Ireland
- Occupation: Presenter
- Employer: RTÉ Raidió na Gaeltachta
- Television: Rónán ar an Camino (TG4)
- Father: Fionntán Mac Aodha Bhuí

Rónán Mac Aodha Bhuí (6 May 1970 – 19 September 2023) was an Irish broadcaster who broadcast mainly through Irish. He is known particularly for his popular magazine programme Rónán Beo on RTÉ Raidió na Gaeltachta. He was born on 6 May 1970 in Cork, but was brought up in Gweedore, in the Donegal gaeltacht, where he attended Bunscoil Bhun Bhig and Pobalscoil Ghaoth Dobhair. He was the youngest son of the author Fionntán Mac Aodha Bhuí and came from a family of eight.

== Life and career ==
Mac Aodha Bhuí studied journalism in Dublin before going on to work at several different radio stations, including Radio Ireland, RTÉ and RTÉ Raidió na Gaeltachta. He has also written for the Irish language publications Anois, Lá and Nós. Outside of his work at Raidió na Gaeltachta, he was active in the entertainment industry and established An Ciorcal Craiceáilte, now defunct, and An Cabaret Craiceáilte, which aims to bring entertainment, particularly music, to Gaeltacht areas and to Gweedore in particular. An Cabaret Craiceáilte usually takes place once a month, and annually at The Soma Festival in Castlewellan, County Down.

Rónán Mac Aodha Bhuí had enjoyed much acclaim and popularity, and in 2011 won the Celtic Media award for Radio Personality of the Year. He had also been awarded two Oireachtas media awards, for Radio Personality of the Year and Radio Series of the Year (for his programme Rónán Beo@3) respectively.

In 2013, he presented the series Rónán ar an Camino on TG4, based on his experiences walking the Way of St. James (Camino de Santiago).

Mac Aodha Bhuí died in Gweedore, County Donegal on 19 September 2023, at the age of 53.

== Legacy ==
To commemorate his impact on the Irish language, an annual festival 'Dorn San Aer' was created in his memory. The festival, which began in 2024 and takes place in Gweedore, takes its title from the revolutionary mantra that was a favourite expression of Mac Aodha Bhuí.

Irish rap group Kneecap dedicated the signing of their 2023 record deal to Mac Aodha Bhuí.
