= Irish Republican Police =

Irish police in 1919-1922

- Common name: Republican Police; IRA Police
- Abbreviation: IRP, IRAP

Agency overview
- Formed: 1920
- Dissolved: 1922
- Superseding agency: Civic Guard
- Legal personality: Police force

Jurisdictional structure
- National agency: Irish Republic
- Operations jurisdiction: Irish Republic
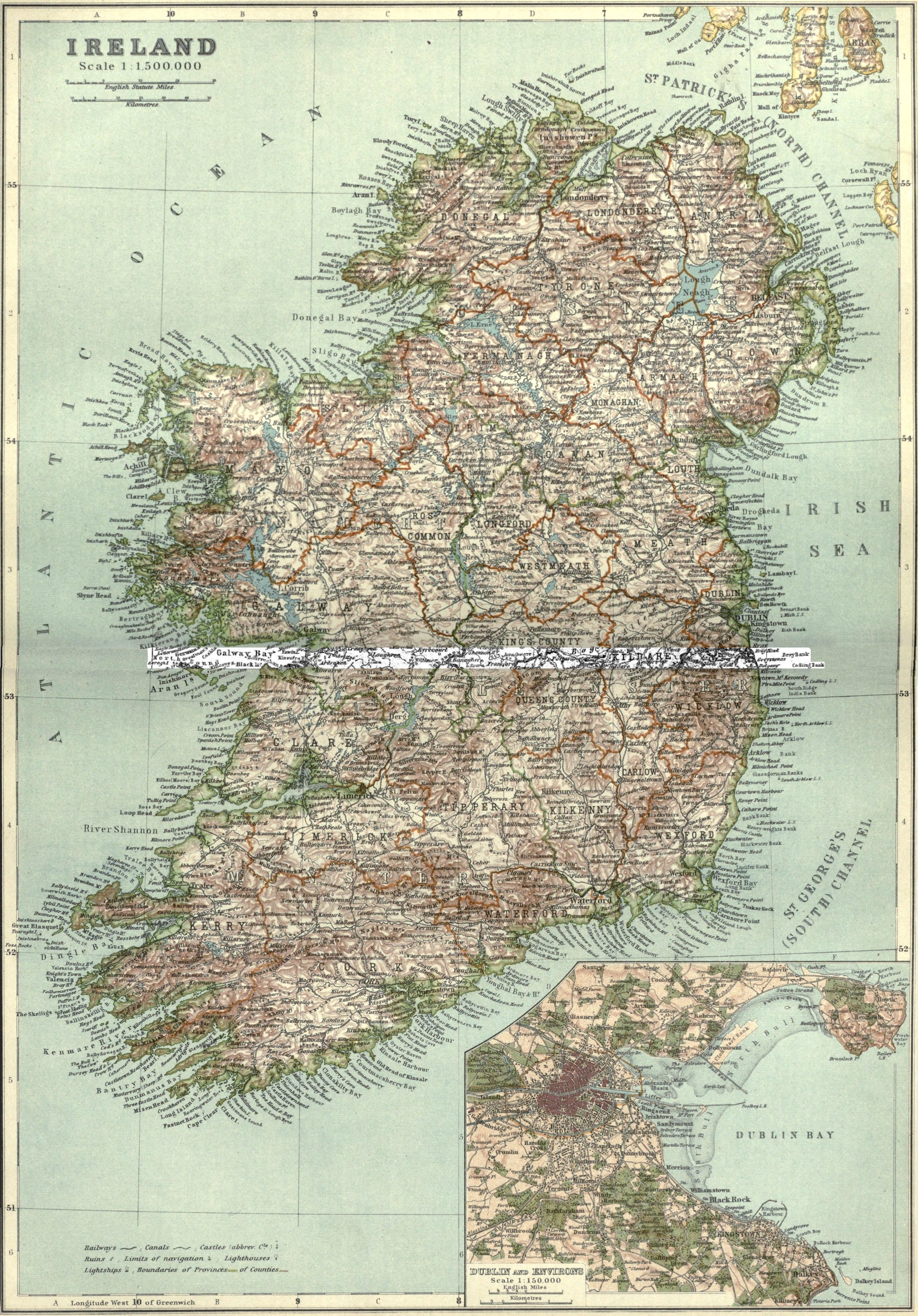
- Map of Ireland, 1911
- Area: 84,421 km^{2} (32,595 sq mi)
- Population: 4.3 million
- General nature: Local civilian police

The Irish Republican Police (IRP; Irish: Poilíní Poblachtacha na hÉireann) was the police force of the 1919–1922 Irish Republic and was administered by the Department for Home Affairs of that government.

== Foundation ==
The IRP was founded between April and June 1920 under the authority of Dáil Éireann. It was initiated by Richard Mulcahy the IRA Chief of Staff, and Cathal Brugha, Minister for Defence. It was handed over to the Minister for Home Affairs Arthur Griffith and later to his successor Austin Stack. Simon Donnelly, an IRA Staff Officer at GHQ, was transferred to the Department of Home Affairs as Chief of Police. At this time there were only six full-time Republican Police in Dublin city. Donnelly immediately instructed that a paid full-time policeman be appointed to each of the seventy-two IRA Brigade areas. They were chosen by the Brigades, and most though not all were IRA volunteers. The purpose of the IRP was to provide security for the Republican Courts, to enforce their judgements, to put into effect the Decrees of the Dáil and to maintain general order. It also occupied itself with such mundane matters as enforcing licensing regulations, dealing with theft and maintaining street patrols. From a propaganda perspective, as with all the institutions of the Irish Republic, it sought to put into effect secession from the United Kingdom. More specifically, the existence of the IRP was considered an important component in the campaign to undermine the authority of the Royal Irish Constabulary.

In 1920, the IRP had a presence in 21 of Ireland's 32 counties. In June 1920, the Irish Bulletin claimed that the IRP had arrested 84 criminals in 24 counties within 13 days.

== Functioning ==
The IRP faced considerable difficulties in enforcing its authority. It was viewed as an illegal and subversive body by the Dublin Castle administration and IRP members at times came into conflict with Crown forces. In one instance, IRP members James Cogan and Harry Sheridan arrested a suspected cattle thief named John Farrelly on 22 July 1920 in Clonsilla. When the commandeered motor vehicle they were using to transport Farrelly encountered a British Army checkpoint, a brief shootout occurred which killed Cogan and wounded Sheridan and Farrelly. During and briefly after the Irish War of Independence, the Royal Irish Constabulary (RIC) repeatedly challenged the Dáil Courts and threatened its judges with prosecution.

The operation of the IRP was also made difficult by some confusion regarding the separation of civil and military structures during the Irish War of Independence. For individual volunteers, their military role as members of the Irish Republican Army and their police function in the IRP were not always clearly differentiated nor was this difference always obvious to the general public. The IRP had no permanent jails or prisons in which to confine suspects and offenders. Despite this obvious limitation in a system of criminal justice, improvised solutions were found to detain prisoners. Some of those convicted by the Republican Courts were expelled from the area and even from the country. In one incident, three offenders who had been banished by a Republican Land Court to an island off the coast of County Clare for three weeks refused to be rescued by the RIC declaring that as citizens of the Irish Republic, the RIC had no jurisdiction over them. Abandoned buildings in isolated areas were also used for detention, as in the case of a former barracks in the Nire Valley deep in the Comeragh Mountains. A suggestion by the Chief of Police that "incorrigible criminals" should be flogged was turned down by his superiors as "a barbarous form of punishment".

== Policing emigration ==
On 4 June 1920, Cathal Brugha as Minister for Defence, issued a manifesto condemning those who had emigrated during the war as 'deserters' and 'degenerates'. There quickly followed a proclamation from the Dáil with instructions regarding the procedure for obtaining an Emigration Permit. For legal travel other than to Britain, (which still required an internal Travel Permit) a British Passport was necessary and often a visa from the receiving state. The Republican Police were charged with the responsibility of issuing Permit application forms, forwarding them with the specified fee of five shillings to the Minister for Home Affairs, and transmitting to the applicant the permit or, more generally a letter of refusal. The irony of the IRP on the one hand enforcing deportation orders as a punishment, while on the other preventing voluntary emigration of people personally known to them, was not lost on local IRP members. There is considerable correspondence from local officials seeking a more lenient interpretation of the Emigration ban by the Department. It may be that because it was so rigidly applied with little apparent prospect of being enforced that it was widely ignored. This served to further undermine the authority of local officers. The Department responded by ordering shipping companies and Emigration Agents not to receive money from prospective migrants that did not possess a Permit under threat of their premises being raided or burned. The manager at the offices of Thomas Cook, a prominent travel company in Grafton Street, Dublin, narrowly avoided being killed for persistent non-compliance with this instruction. Simon Donnelly had ordered him to be shot, however Austin Stack decided instead on the destruction of the offices. The operation was scheduled for the morning of 11 July 1921, but had not been carried out before the Truce took effect at noon that day.

== Organisation ==
IRP recruits generally came from the ranks of the Irish Republican Army. In the city of Cork, where the IRP had a considerable presence, the IRA elected officers for duty with the IRP. The following extract taken from a contemporary memo, gives a precise overview of the numbers involved nationwide as reported by the officer in charge.

"The Police were formally organised according to the military areas, and the Brigade was the basis of organisation. The details of strength were:-
One Brigade Police Officer for the area.
One Officer for each Battalion Area.
One Company Officer and four men for each Company Area.
The approximate strength of the force under this scheme was 72 Brigade Officers, about 340 Battalion Officers, 1,910 Company Officers and 7,640 rank and file. This force was, of course, rather big but owing to the fact that the men were untrained and were working under great difficulty and under extraordinary circumstances, it was found necessary to retain them. The scheme came into operation last June (ed. 1921)."

The members of the IRP wore no uniform, however some wore armbands with the letters IRP or IRAP.

== Civil war and replacement of IRP ==
On 25 August 1922, following the outbreak of civil war, the Adjutant-General of the National Army addressing Kevin O'Higgins, Acting Minister of Home Affairs, issued an internal memorandum regarding the local policing situation in Cork. This was done on his return to Dublin from a tour of inspection in the south of the country. Gearóid O'Sullivan reported that

"prior to and during the Irregular occupation of Cork, the work of policing the city was carried on by the Irish Republican Police. These men were paid by the Merchants, who voluntarily paid up to £200 for the purpose. They were admitted on all sides to have been fairly efficient in preventing ordinary crime, but when the Irregulars fled the city at the approach of the National Forces, Cork was without a police force of any sort. Robbery, burglary and looting became rife."

As a replacement, he confirmed authorisation for the establishment of a force of one hundred locally recruited men, to be paid at a rate of £3 6s 0d per week by the Government. The force was called the Cork City Civil Patrol. Recruiting had commenced on 11 August and they were drawn from 'neutral' IRA men, and Irishmen who had previously been part of the British Army and Royal Navy. They were to be augmented by 50 Civic Guards from Dublin, and those found suitable would be gradually absorbed onto the new national police force. The Cork police were unarmed and in lieu of a uniform wore "a white brassard with the letters CCP inscribed on it in black." In case there was any doubt that they were, at least temporarily, under the authority of the Army rather than the Department of Defence much less Home Affairs, each new member took the following pledge:

I hereby undertake and agree to obey the lawful orders of Captain Joseph MacCarthy, or any other officer nominated by General Dalton for the time being in charge of the Patrol. I acknowledge that any employment is purely temporary and agree that one weeks notice on either side may terminate same,
Dated this ______ day of August 1922

== Bibliography and notes ==
- Sheills, Derek,"The Politics of Policing: Ireland 1919–1923", in Policing Western Europe eds. Clive Emsley, Barbara Weinberger ISBN 978-0-313-28219-5
- Kotsonouris, Mary (a), Retreat from Revolution: The Dáil Courts, 1920–24: Irish Academic Press, Dublin: 1994 ISBN 978-0-7165-2511-0
- Ministry for Home Affairs: The Constructive Work of Dáil Éireann (sic) No. 1 – The National Police and Courts of Justice: Talbot Press: Dublin: 1921 (Attributed to Erskine Childers) Politics and Irish life, 1913–1921
- Mitchell, Arthur: Revolutionary Government in Ireland- Dáil Éireann 1919–1922, Gill & MacMillan, Dublin, 1995
- Desmond, Michael: IRP West Waterford B'de.: Witness Statement W.S. 1338 : Bureau of Military History Ext. Link (Copies of the Witness Statements are accessible to the public at the National Archives of Ireland though not, as yet, online.)
- Cork Archives Institute PR4 Terence MacSwiney 1920 Files.
- The Dáil Éireann Courts Commission, National Archives of Ireland
- Donnolly, Simon, Chief of Republican Police: Witness Statement W.S. 481: Bureau of Military History: Accessed at National Archives of Ireland
- NAI JUS H97/3 Chief of Police (S. Donnelly) to Min. Home Affairs 24/02/22 Report on Republican Police Force
- Early Dept. Finance files : National Archives of Ireland : FIN 1/513-dated; 25 August 1922-titled; Report on Cork -(To) Acting Minister of Home Affairs- signed: Domhnall Ó Súillabháin.
