= The Village (music venue) =

Music venue in Dublin, Ireland

Coordinates: 53.336699°N 6.265705°W

Village logo

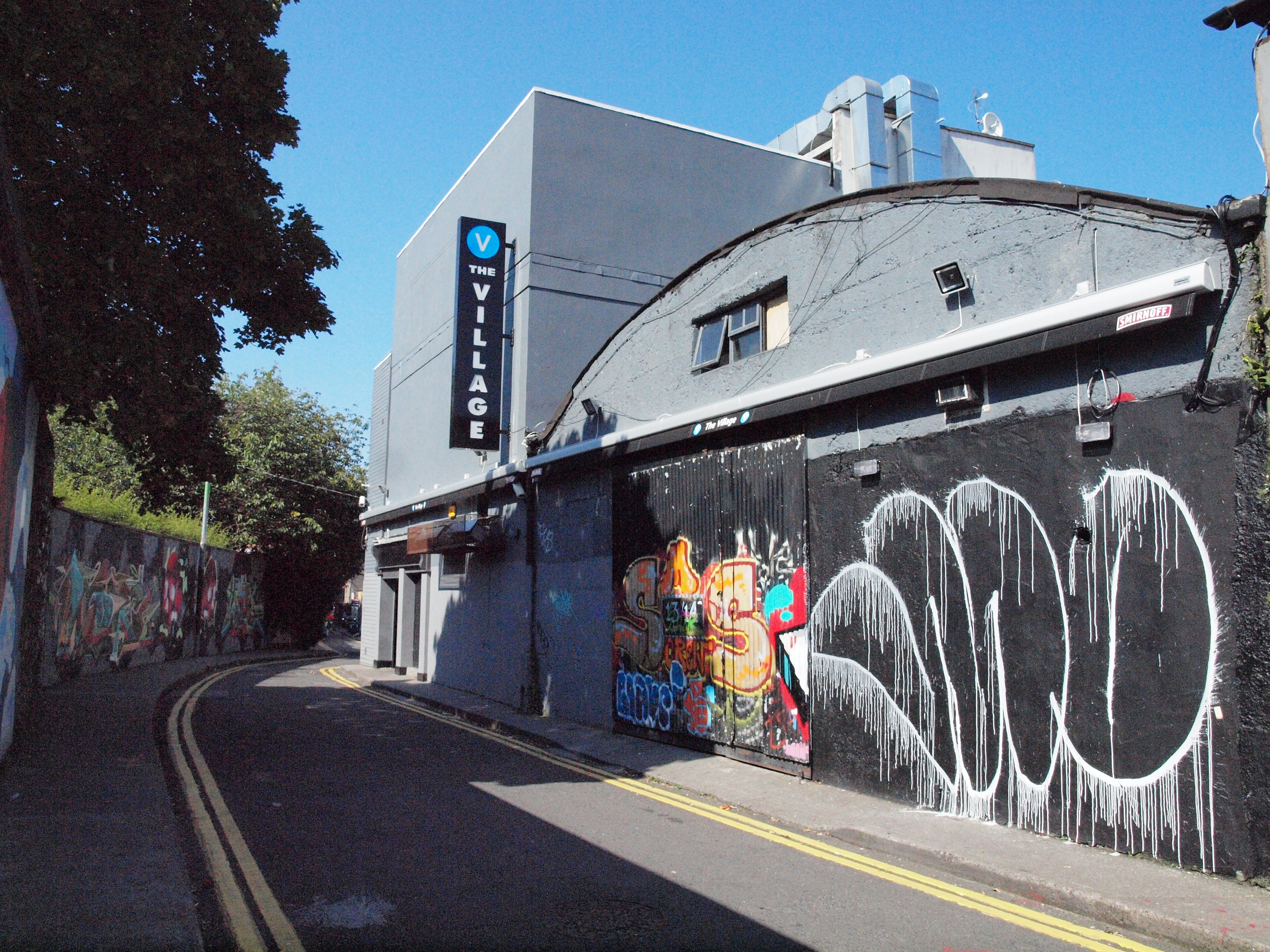
The Village, showing entrance

The Village is a music venue situated next to Whelan's on Wexford Street, Dublin, Ireland. Formerly a nightclub owned by Mean Fiddler, in 2003 it was turned into a music venue. It has a large balcony and a capacity of 550.

On 16 March 2008 at approximately 01:15, The Village caught fire. Over 800 people inside at the time were evacuated safely within seven minutes. The fire affected mainly the front of the premises and the damage to the building was not extensive. The fire was blamed on an electrical fault.

Acts to have played this venue include VNV Nation, Ian Brown, The Blizzards, Y&T, The Coronas, Damien Dempsey, Ocean Colour Scene, Republic of Loose, Bell X1, Bloc Party, The Frames.
