= Proinsias Mac an Bheatha =

- Born: Francis McVeigh; 16 November 1910; Belfast, Ireland
- Died: 27 November 1990 (aged 80)
- Occupations: Civil servant, director, publisher, writer
- Spouse: Monica Ní Mhurchú (m. 1944)
- Children: Máire, Monica, Eilís, Pádraig, Proinsias, Éamonn, and Dónal

Proinsias Mac an Bheatha (born Francis McVeigh; 16 November 1910 – 27 November 1990) was an Irish language activist and writer.

== Early life ==
Francis McVeigh was born on 16 November 1910 in Belfast to Patrick McVeigh, a publican from Gilford in County Down, and Mary Gorman, an Irish republican from Coolaney whose grandfather had been a Fenian. Francis had two sisters. The family moved to Killough when he was five years old until his father died a year later, at which point Francis was placed in the care of his uncle and aunt. He was later sent to live with another aunt in Bangor. After a while he went to live with his mother and sisters in the Falls Road area of Belfast. In school he overheard a teacher talking about the Irish language and, despite his family's nationalism, it was the first time he became aware of the language's existence.

His family viewed the Anglo-Irish Treaty as a betrayal and when their home was broken into during the Belfast Pogrom in 1922, Francis alongside his mother and two sisters moved to Sandymount in Dublin, where he attended a Christian Brothers school in Westland Row and began to learn Irish. He developed a passion for the language and joined Conradh na Gaeilge, the writings of Séamus Ó Grianna and Seosamh Mac Grianna in particular inspiring his interest. In 1928, at the age of 18, McVeigh entered the Irish civil service and adopted the Irish language form of his name, Proinsias Mac an Bheatha, upon joining the Customs and Mail Service in 1932, a job he would remain in for forty years, having become Chief Collector by the time he retired in 1975. He made his first visit to the Donegal Gaeltacht in 1936 before spending another year in Inishmaan.

== Craobh na hAiséirghe ==
In 1940 Mac an Bheatha joined Craobh na hAiséirghe (meaning "Branch of the Resurrection" in Irish), an organisation dedicated to the promotion of the Irish language created by Gearóid Ó Cuinneagáin, unbeknownst to Mac an Bheatha, for the purpose of covertly promoting fascism in Ireland. During Craobh na hAiséirghe's first public meeting at Foster Place in Dublin, Mac an Bheatha handed Ó Cuinneagáin his hat as the latter collected funds from the audience. Mac an Bheatha admired Ó Cuinneagáin's leadership, expressing praise for Ó Cuinneagáin's determination and imagination later in life after the two had fallen out, and at the organisation's first annual meeting he saw no issue when Ó Cuinneagáin sought absolute powers of direction over the organisation.

Proinsias Mac an Bheatha was made an auditor of Craobh na hAiséirghe and represented them alongside Gearóid Ó Cuinneagáin at Conradh na Gaelige's 1940 Ard Fheis, though Mac an Bheatha had become disillusioned with the latter organisation and when Ó Cuinneagáin sought election to the presidency of Conradh na Gaelige, Mac an Bheatha claimed in a newspaper article supporting Ó Cuinneagáin that his election would be "the last chance Conradh na Gaelige will get to reform itself.". Gearóid Ó Cuinneagáin failed to be elected twice and in response Craobh na hAiséirghe commenced a virtual boycott of Conradh na Gaelige.

== Formation of Glún na Buaidhe ==
Mac an Beatha and many other members of Craobh na hAiséirghe were alarmed when, on Whit Weekend 1942, Ó Cuinneagáin gave a speech calling for a totalitarian government with a single absolute ruler and announced the formation of a new political movement, Ailtirí na hAiséirghe to work alongside Craobh na hAiséirghe as Sinn Féin and Conradh na Gaelige had prior. Though he hoped that Germany would emerge victorious in the Second World War, Mac an Bheatha was opposed to the idea of a dictatorship in Ireland and insisted to Ó Cuinneagáin that the photographs taken of him for the Craobh na hAiséirghe yearbook should not be used to imply that he was connected to Ailtirí na hAiséirghe.

The falling out between Mac an Bheatha and Ó Cuinneagain continued when the yearbook, Aiséirghe 1942, was published, as it was devoted purely to the latter's political views and contained a photograph of Mac an Bheatha and Ó Cuinneagáin standing by an Aiséirghe banner, giving the false impression that Mac an Bheatha endorsed Ó Cuinneagain's agenda. After months of disputes it was agreed to separate the two organisations at a meeting on 6 November 1942, and Mac an Bheatha was elected to head up the now-independent Craobh na hAiséirghe. The next month the organisation renamed itself to Glún na Buaidhe ("Generation of Victory") and agreed to assume Craobh na hAiséirghe's debts, seeking to avoid a dispute over funds that could inhibit the organisation's momentum.

Mac an Bheatha was summoned to the first meeting of Comhdháil Náisiúnta na Gaeilge and in 1946 Glún na Buaidhe and the Comhchaidreamh managed to oust Conradh na Gaelige from its leading role in the council, with Ernest Blythe becoming the Comhdháil's president and Mac an Bheatha becoming vice-president. He remained vice-president of the Comhdháil and general-director of Glún na Buaidhe until he resigned in 1966, dissatisfied with the state of the language revival and the Irish government's handling of it.

== Later life ==
Mac an Bheatha founded the Irish language newspaper Inniu in 1943 and wrote articles and essays for the paper, frequently under the alias "Séamus Ó Dochartaigh". Later in life, he became a contributor of columns in the Irish Press, Evening Press, The Irish News, The Irish Times and the Irish Independent. He was also involved in the founding of Foilseacháin Náisiúnta Teoranta (FNT), buying the Mayo News business in Westport in 1948. In 1944, he married Monica Ní Mhurchú, with whom he had seven children.

Mac an Bheatha wrote a biography of James Connolly in which he advanced the view that Connolly's beliefs were compatible with Catholic social teaching and theorised that he would have rejected communism had he lived to see it implemented. After his resignation from the Comhdháil and Glún na Buaidhe he became a more avid author, writing books, essays, gardening columns and poetry.

He died on 27 November 1990 and was buried in Sutton, Dublin.

== Works ==
- Tart na Córa (1962)
- Téid Focal le Gaoth (1967)
- Seosamh Mac Grianna agus Aistí Eile (1970)
- Irish for the People (1973)
- An Faoileán Bán (1975)
- James Connolly and the Workers' Republic (1978)
- Cnoc na hUamha (1978)
- Roth an Mhuilinn (1980)
- Téann Buille le Cnámh (1983)
- Jemmy Hope (1985)
- An Earnáil agus an Ghaeilge (1985)
- Mé Féin agus an Gairdín (1986)
- I dTreo na Gréine (1987)
- Dóchas Aduaidh (1991)
- Henry Joy agus Véarsaí Eile (1992)
