= Amárach =

Amárach (Irish: Tomorrow) was an Irish-language weekly newspaper founded in 1956 by Peadar Ó Ceallaigh (1913–2000), a Donegal native living in Co Meath, who also headed the organization "Muintir na Gaeltachta". The newspaper's subtitle was "Guth na Gaeltachta" (The voice of the Gaeltacht), and Amárach aimed to serve the Irish-speaking population of the Gaeltacht areas. Ó Ceallaigh edited and published the paper, which was printed in Ballyshannon, until May 1977, when it was sold to Comharchumann Chois Fharraige. Thereafter the paper was published and printed in Conamara, until in 1984 it was merged with the Dublin-based Irish-language paper Inniú to form the weekly newspaper Anois.
