= Tarlach Ó hUid =

Irish activist and journalist

- Born: Augustus Walter Hood; 13 January 1917; London, United Kingdom
- Died: 30 October 1990 (aged 73)
- Occupations: Editor, journalist, writer
- Spouse: Eilís Ní Earáin (m. 1946)
- Children: Tarlach, Gráinne

Tarlach Ó hUid (born Augustus Walter Hood; 13 January 1917 - 30 October 1990) was an English-born Irish language activist, journalist and writer who became a member of the Irish Republican Army during World War II.

== Early life ==
Augustus Walter Hood was born on 13 January 1917 in south Deptford, London, one of three sons and two daughters of his father of the same name Augustus Walter Hood, a munitions worker who would go on to become a carpenter following World War I, and his wife, Ada Brockwell. He and his family's only relation to Ireland was that his grandmother, Mary Anne Martha Henry, was from County Cork, but despite this four of his siblings would end up joining Conradh na Gaeilge, with one later joining the IRA and two joining Cumann na mBan. His mother was a Baptist but as Augustus attended a Methodist Sunday school he grew up as a member of that denomination.

Hood took an interest in literature at a young age, earning a scholarship to Greenwich Secondary School. Following schooling, Hood worked as a clerk in several factories and joined the Greenshirt Movement for Social Credit. Hood became deeply influenced by the book Ireland, its Scenery, Character etc., 1842 by Mr and Mrs S.C. Hall, and began afterwards to learn the Irish language from Eugene O'Growney's Simple Lessons in Irish series, changing his name to Tarlach Ó hUid and joining the London branch of Conradh na Gaeilge three years later. He spent two weeks in Summer 1936 in Dublin and, believing it was natural for a Gael to become a Catholic, converted to Catholicism in 1937. Ó hUid was later awarded a scholarship by Conradh na Gaeilge in 1938 to spend a holiday in the Gaeltacht.

== Membership of the IRA ==
Following his time in Ireland, he joined the IRA in London and moved to the Donegal Gaeltacht and Strabane before being ordered by his superiors in the IRA to change location to Belfast, where he first met his future wife Eilís Ní Earáin, the daughter of another IRA member. Tarlach Ó hUid became editor of the IRA's newspaper War News under the alias Terry Wilson. Under Ó hUid's editorship the publication took a staunchly pro-German, racist and anti-semitic line, claiming IRA involvement in German bombings of British cities, accusing the arrival of war refugees of putting Irish people out of work, praising German ethnic cleansing of Jews and alleging that Éamon de Valera's government was dominated by Jews and Freemasons. Ó hUid also co-founded and broadcast talks on the IRA's illegal radio station, Irish Republican Radio.

Ó hUid was arrested in 1940 and interned in Crumlin Road Jail, he would later be transferred to Derry Prison two years later before being sent back to Crumlin Road following another two years. Ó hUid was released on 8 December 1945, one of the last internees to be freed. In prison he acted as head of the internees and organised classes, performed plays and produced the magazine Faoi Ghlas for inmates, striving to teach the Irish language to the prisoners. By 1943, Ó hUid had grown disillusioned with the IRA following the Stephen Hayes fiasco and intended to resign, but refused to declare to the authorities that he would no longer be associated with Irish republicans. In December 1944, Ó hUid joined Glún na Buaidhe in prison. He wrote the novel An Bealach chun an Bhearnais, which would be published in 1949.

== Release from prison and later life ==
Upon Ó hUid's release, he worked as part-time secretary for the Belfast branch of Conradh na Gaeilge and became an active member of the fascist party Ailtirí na hAiséirghe. Between November 1945 and January 1946, Ó hUid published a number of short stories and an article in An Iris. In 1946 he married Eílís Ní Earáin in Belfast, with whom he would have two children, a son named Tarlach and a daughter named Gráinne, and in 1948 moved to Dublin, where he wrote the radio comedy Ruaig ar roicne. Ó hUid subsequently acquired a job as assistant-editor for the newspaper Inniu, of which he would become editor in 1972 until the paper disbanded in 1984.

Ó hUid devoted much of his life after his release to literature, writing a collection of short stories entitled Taobh thall den teorainn in 1950, An dá thrá in 1952, two children's adventure stories entitled Eachtra Nollag in 1960 and Éalú in 1961, Adios in 1975, and a collection of poems, Rachtanna feirge, bróin agus grá in 1978. Additionally he wrote also two autobiographies of his life until 1945, Ar Thóir mo Shealbha in 1960 and Faoi Ghlas in 1985, the former sparking controversy as Ó hUid condemned the IRA and apologised for having been a member of the organisation. Máirtín Ó Cadhain harshly criticised Ó hUid's book in Feasta and Ó hUid believed that Ó Cadhain was particularly irritated with him because Ó hUid had chosen to become a Catholic while many republicans would have preferred him to remain a "pet Protestant" within their ranks. The publisher Routledge & Kegan Paul showed interest in publishing Ó hUid's autobiography in English but he refused to grant permission.

== Death ==
Ó hUid died on 30 October 1990 and was buried in Glasnevin Cemetery.

== Works ==
- An Bealach chun an Bhearnais (1949)
- Taobh thall den teorainn (1950)
- An dá thrá (1952)
- Ar Thóir mo Shealbha (1960)
- Eachtra Nollag (1960)
- Éalú (1961)
- Adios (1975)
- Rachtanna feirge, bróin agus grá (1978)
- Faoi Ghlas (1985)
