= Wolfe Tone Weekly =

The Wolfe Tone Weekly (1937–1939) was an Irish republican newspaper, edited by Brian O'Higgins.

It first appeared in September 1937. Unlike its republican predecessor, An Phoblacht (edited by Peadar O'Donnell), the Wolfe Tone Weekly lacked radical social content. O'Higgins, who was assisted by Easter Rising veteran Joe Clarke, was a social conservative whose ideological emphasis was on Gaelic revivalism and was influenced by ideals of corporatism in vogue at the time, making regular references to the Papal encyclicals and occasionally praising European integralism

The Wolfe Tone Weekly generally endeavoured to promote the policies of the Republican Movement. Its contributors numbered people like Jimmy Steele, at the time serving seven years in Crumlin Road Prison, Brendan Behan, and Gearóid Ó Cuinneagáin.

The 17 December 1938 issue of the Wolfe Tone Weekly carried a statement from a body calling itself the Executive Council of Dáil Éireann, Government of the Republic, purporting that it had transferred governmental authority to the IRA (see Irish republican legitimatism).

After the IRA's declaration of war on Britain in January 1939, and the attacks that followed as part of the IRA's S-Plan, the Wolfe Tone Weekly continued to appear, but was finally suppressed in September 1939, with the introduction of internment in the Free State.
