= Aungier Street =

Street in Dublin, Ireland

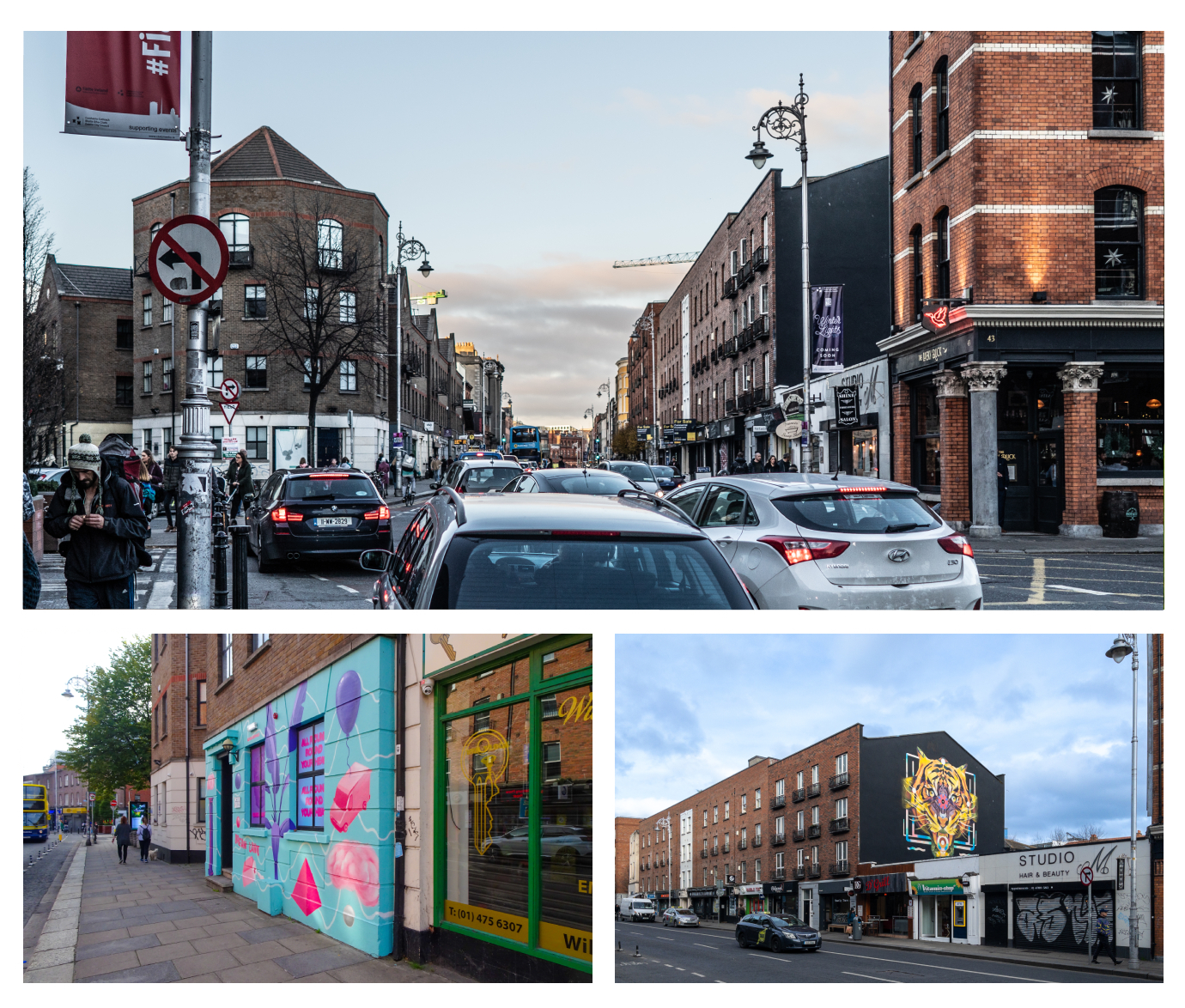
- Aungier Street

- Location within Central Dublin
- Native name: Sráid Aungier (Irish)
- Namesake: Francis Aungier, 1st Baron Aungier of Longford and family
- Length: 350 m (1,150 ft)
- Width: 18 metres (59 ft)
- Location: Dublin, Ireland
- Postal code: D02
- Coordinates: 53.339856°N 6.265806°W
- north end: South Great George's Street, Stephen Street
- south end: Bishop Street, Redmond's Hill, Digges Street Upper, Cuffe Street

Construction
- Inauguration: 1661

Other
- Known for: Whitefriar Street Carmelite Church, Dublin Business School, cafés, pubs, shops

Aungier Street /ˈeɪndʒər/ (Irish: Sráid Aungier) is a street on the south side of Dublin, Ireland. It runs north-south as a continuation of South Great George's Street.

It is the location of both a Technological University Dublin and a Dublin Business School campus.

== History ==
Formerly this area was waste ground near the Dublin Carmelite Friary. After the Dissolution of the Monasteries, the monastery's lands were granted to the Aungier family.

The street was named after the family of Francis Aungier, 1st Baron Aungier of Longford who developed the street. His name is French and in French is pronounced [on.ʒje], but modern Dubliners pronounce the street name to rhyme with "danger." When the street was opened in 1661, it was 70 feet (21 m) wide, the widest in the city.

Edward Lovett Pearce designed a theatre for the street, built 1733–34 and merged with the Smock Alley Theatre in 1743. The theatre held the title of theatre royal for a period before it was reclaimed by Smock Alley Theatre shortly after with the Aungier Street Playhouse closing around 1750.

St. Peter's Church (Church of Ireland) opened in 1685; it closed in 1950 and was demolished in 1983.

The poet Thomas Moore was born at 12 Aungier Street in 1779.

In 1829, Aungier Street was the site of the first meeting room of what would become the Plymouth Brethren.

The Irish republican Simon Donnelly was born on Aungier Street in 1891.

During the Irish War of Independence, it was suggested that Aungier Street (and several others) would be joined to form Cahirmore Road, named for the legendary king Cathair Mór.

== Cultural depictions ==
In 1851, Sheridan Le Fanu wrote a ghost story, "An Account of Some Strange Disturbances in Aungier Street."

Aungier Street appears twice in the work of James Joyce: it is mentioned in "Ivy Day in the Committee Room;" while Leopold Bloom's blinds were purchased at 16 Aungier Street in Ulysses.

== See also ==
- List of streets and squares in Dublin
