= Risteárd Ó Glaisne =

Irish journalist, teacher and writer (1927–2003)

- Born: Richard Ernest Giles; 2 September 1927; Bandon, County Cork, Ireland
- Died: 6 November 2003 (aged 76)
- Occupation(s): Editor, journalist, teacher, writer

Risteárd Ó Glaisne (born Richard Ernest Giles; 2 September 1927 - 6 November 2003) was a Methodist Irish language activist, teacher and writer.

== Early life ==
Richard Ernest Giles was born at the farm of Woodfort near Bandon, County Cork on 2 September 1927 as the second-youngest son of George William Giles and Sara Jane Vickery, a Methodist family descended from farmers that had lived in the area for over three centuries. Giles contracted Bovine tuberculosis as a child, which damaged his hip and would result in him walking with a limp for the rest of his life.

From the age of nine, Giles attended primary and secondary school at Bandon Grammar School. There, his interest in the Irish language was first sparked when his headmaster gave him a copy of Liam Ó Rinn's Peann agus Pár and a book of poems by Ivan Turgenev translated into Irish. He founded the school's first student magazine, The Rooster, under the Irish translation of his birth name and developed a friendship that would prove lifelong with Ivan McCutcheon, one of the school headmasters.

He continued to grow a passion for the Irish language, making contact with the few native Irish speakers remaining in the region of Bandon including his neighbour, a Catholic farmer named Seán Ó Shea, who was a friend of his grandmother's and frequently visited the Giles family household; Richard in turn visited him and his sister.

== University and teaching career ==
Following secondary school Giles attended Trinity College, doing an honours course in Irish and English. During his time at the university he joined the Moral Re-Armament movement in addition to becoming secretary of Trinity College's Irish language society, and befriended several of his peers such as Desmond Fennell and Margaret Mac Curtain. After graduating Bachelor of Arts, Giles became a teacher and pursued a higher diploma in education in 1950 and a master's degree in 1959. He taught Irish at Avoca School from 1949 to 1964, St Andrew's from 1968 to 1972 and St. Patrick's Cathedral School from 1973 to 1989 before retiring.

In the 1950s he became curious about folk education and visited Denmark and The Netherlands. In Summer 1964 he took a career leave to visit Europe for the next four years, observing the educational system of France and travelling to various other countries on the continent on behalf of the Department of Education.

== Religion ==
Ó Glaisne was a staunch Methodist and lay-preacher who believed that Irish Protestants could be just as Irish as Catholics and called on his fellow Protestants to identify fully with the Irish nation. He joined Cumann Gaeilge na hEaglaise and was keen to draw attention to the historical links connecting Protestantism and the Irish language such as the history of Protestant evangelists in Ireland prothelysing in Irish. Donald Caird, a Church of Ireland Archbishop of Dublin who shared Ó Glaisne's keen interest in the Irish language, described him as "deeply spiritual".

In 1957, Ó Glaisne and his friend Wally Gray founded the monthly magazine Focus, which primarily aimed at promoting the Irish language and Gaelic culture to Irish Protestants, though it was in theory interdenominational. Ó Glaisne would serve as editor of the magazine from 1958 to 1966. In later years Ó Glaisne became a Methodist representative on the Secondary Education Committee for Protestant Schools, a body formed to represent Protestant schools in their relations with the Irish government.

== Writing and language advocacy ==
From July 1947 until the evacuation of 1953 Giles spent his holidays on the Blasket Islands to improve his command of Irish by immersing himself in the local culture, at one point meeting Éamon de Valera in person during the latter's visit to the island in 1947. He befriended many residents of the islands and remained in close contact with them after they were resettled in Dunquin following the extreme winter of November 1953. On the 5th of April 1950 Richard legally changed his name by deed poll to its Gaelicised translation, Risteárd Ó Glaisne.

He attended the Mansion House meeting of the Language Freedom Movement on 21 September 1966, speaking in defence of the Irish language, though even his presence at the meeting drew criticism from others in the Irish language movement.

Ó Glaisne made many appearances on RTÉ and Raidio na Gaeltachta, and was a prolific writer in the later years of his life, authoring books and contributing to Irish language journals such as Comhar, Inniu and An tUltach in addition to appearing regularly in The Irish Times. In 1988 he was presented the "Gradam an Phiarsaigh" (Pearse Award) by then-President of Ireland Patrick Hillery on behalf of leading Irish language organisations, who had given Ó Glaisne the award in recognition of Ó Glaisne's contribution to the language.

== Death ==
Risteárd Ó Glaisne died on 6 November 2003 and was buried in St. John's Cemetery, Bandon. Two of his books, Esperanto: teanga idirnáisiúnta and Eagarthóir, were published posthumously.

== Works ==
- Bun-Ghaeilge; a concise guide to Irish (1961)
- Ian Paisley agus Tuaisceart Éireann (1971)
- Raon mo shiúil (1972)
- Saoirse na mban (1973)
- Ceannródaithe (1974)
- Conor Cruise O’Brien agus an liobrálachas (1974)
- Cuairt ghearr: spléachadh ar na Stáit Aontaithe (1975)
- Cad deir tú leis na hAlbanaigh? (1978)
- Don ábhar saoririseora (1980)
- Raidió na Gaeltachta (1982)
- Cúis náire – agus bróid: Proinsias Ó Mianáin agus cearta Gael (1988)
- Tomás Ó Fiaich (1990)
- To Irish Protestants (1991)
- Gaeilge i gColáiste na Tríonóide 1592-1992 (1992)
- Dúbhglas de hÍde (1991-1993)(2 vols.)
- Teilhard de Chardin i gcuibhrinn Éireannach (1994)
- Pádraig Ó Fiannachta (1995)
- Cosslett Ó Cuinn (1996)
- Niall Brunicardi (1997);
- Modhaigh: scéal pobail – scéal eaglaise (1999)
- Denis Ireland (2000)
- De bhunadh Protastúnach nó rian Chonradh na Gaeilge (2000)
- Dí-armáil nó díothú: Éire, an Eoraip, an Domhan (2001)
- Cearbhall Ó Dálaigh (2001)
- Coláiste Moibhí (2002)
- Esperanto: teanga idirnáisiúnta (2004)
- Eagarthóir (2005)
