= Bureau of Military History =

Irish military archive

The Bureau of Military History in Ireland was established in January 1947 by Oscar Traynor TD, Minister for Defence and former Captain in the Irish Volunteers. The rationale for the establishment of the Bureau was to give individuals who played an active part in the events which brought about Irish Independence a chance to record their own experiences. Those who took part included members of groups such as the Irish Volunteers and subsequently the Irish Republican Army (IRA), Cumann na mBan, the Irish Republican Brotherhood (IRB), Sinn Féin, the Irish Citizen Army, and relatives of deceased not associated with any organisation.

The materials were closed until 2003, when they were opened to public access. In 2012, a substantial portion of the materials were made available online.

== Contemporary documents ==
In the ten years subsequent to its establishment the project collected 1,773 witness statements totaling 35,000 pages, 334 sets of contemporary documents, 42 photographs, 12 voice recordings, 210 photographs of action sites of Easter Week, and a collection of press cuttings. The objective was then ‘to assemble and co-ordinate material to form the basis for the compilation of the history of the movement for Independence from the formation of the Irish Volunteers on 25 November 1913, to 11 July 1921.’ When the Bureau members had completed their mission, they oversaw the placing of the witness statements into 83 steel boxes, together with 66 annexes to witness statements, 54 collections of records of people who did not contribute statements, 178 collections of press cuttings, 12 voice recordings, 246 photographs and 322 bundles of original documents. In March 1959, the archive was locked in the strongroom in Government Buildings, not to be released to researchers and the general public until after the death of the last recipient of the military-service pension that had testified to the Bureau.

== Formally opened ==
On 11 March 2003, the Bureau of Military History collection of Witness Statements was formally made available to the public. Beginning in 1999, under the direction of Commandant Victor Laing, four civilian archivists were involved in processing the collection. (During processing the collection itself remained closed to the public). Copies of the Statements (less the Contemporary Documents (CDs), still held at Cathal Brugha Barracks), were deposited at the National Archives of Ireland where they can now be examined by all. In attendance at the hand-over were the Taoiseach Bertie Ahern TD, Minister for Defence Michael Smith TD, Chief of Staff Lieutenant General C. Mangan, and a number of officers and soldiers of the Irish army. Also present were a number of historians and several children and grandchildren of witnesses. Bertie Ahern in his opening address said: "I am delighted to be here this evening in the historic setting of Cathal Brugha Barracks to mark an event of the utmost significance to the birth of our modern democracy." Commenting on the collection he continued "The Bureau of Military History collection is truly a treasure trove of the personal memories and reflections of the men and women who nursed this country into existence. It records an era of sacrifice, bravery and vision, by those who played an active part in the irresistible final momentum to our national independence." According to Margaret Mac Curtain, who comments on Professor F X. Martin, who "had glumly described the inaccessible Bureau of Military History as being cut off from the public by an ‘official iron curtain’ on the occasion of the fiftieth anniversary of the 1916 Rising, states "the definitive history of the 1916 Rising has yet to be written; these statements will be indispensable for those who seek to write it."

== Digitisation and online access ==
A substantial part of Bureau of Military History records have now been digitized and made available in searchable format. The online data, comprising 35 000 pages, 42 photographic collections and 12 voice recordings was officially launched by Arts Minister Jimmy Deenihan on 7 August 2012.

== Sources ==
- Department of the Taoiseach
- Defence Forces Headquarters
- Annie Ryan, Witnesses:Inside the Easter Rising, Liberties, 2005, ISBN 0-9545335-5-0
- National Archives of Ireland
