= Aiséirí =

Aiséirí Aiséirġe
- Type: Newspaper
- Format: Tabloid
- Editor: Gearóid Ó Cuinneagáin
- Founded: 1943
- Ceased publication: 1973
- Language: Irish, English

Aiséirí (pronounced [ˈaʃeːɾʲiː]; pre-reform spelling: Aiséirġe; "Resurrection") was a political newspaper, published in Dublin, Ireland, from 1943 until 1973.

The newspaper was founded by Gearóid Ó Cuinneagáin as the party organ of Ailtirí na hAiséirghe. This was a minor radical nationalist and fascist political party, founded in 1942. It sought to form a totalitarian Irish Christian corporatist state. The party obtained no seats in the 1943 and 1944 general elections and gradually weakened after a split in 1945, despite winning 9 seats out of 31 contested in the elections of that year. It finished in 1958, but the newspaper continued to be published.
